= Fray Bartolomé de las Casas =

- Municipality
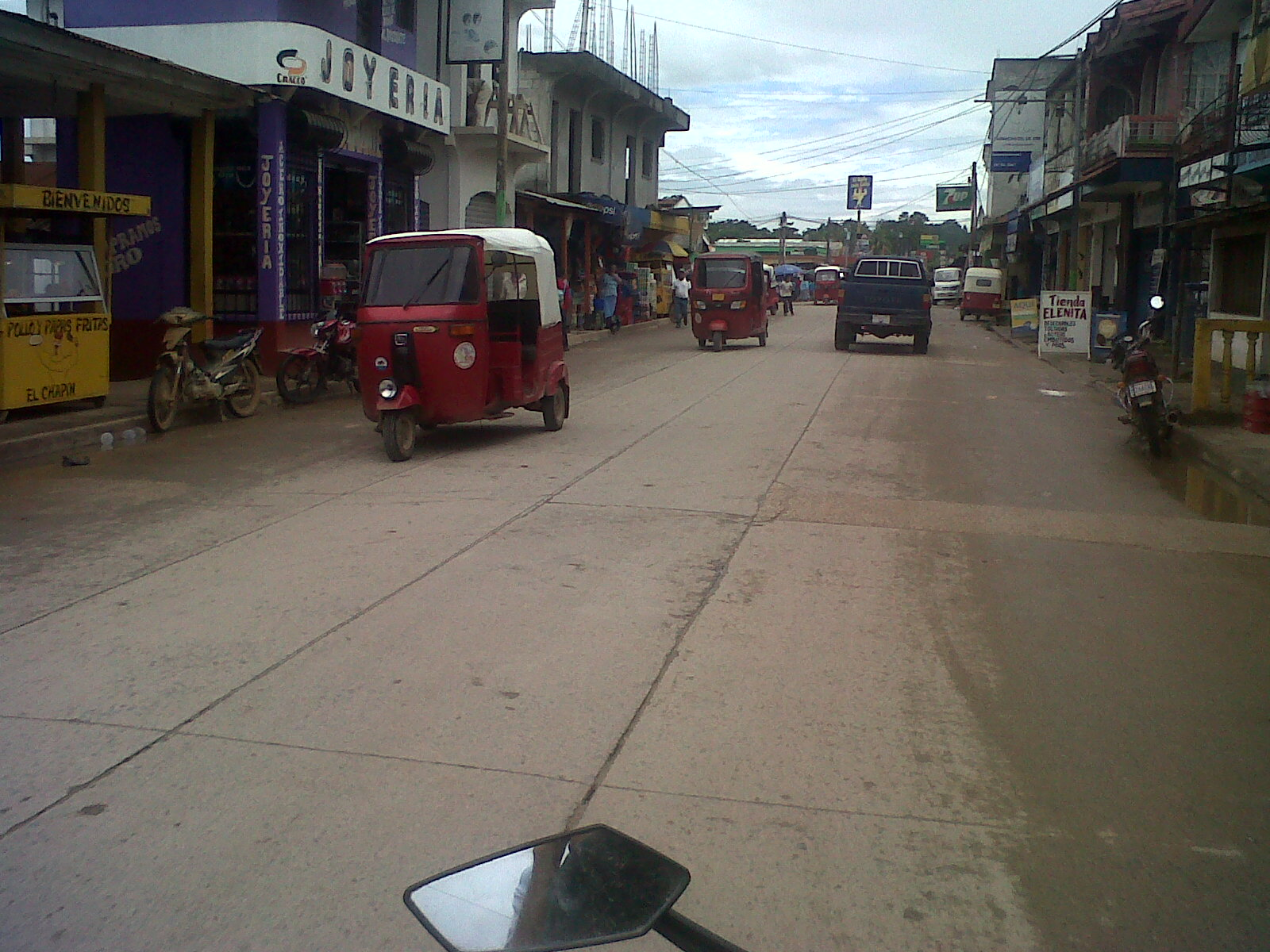
- A street in the city

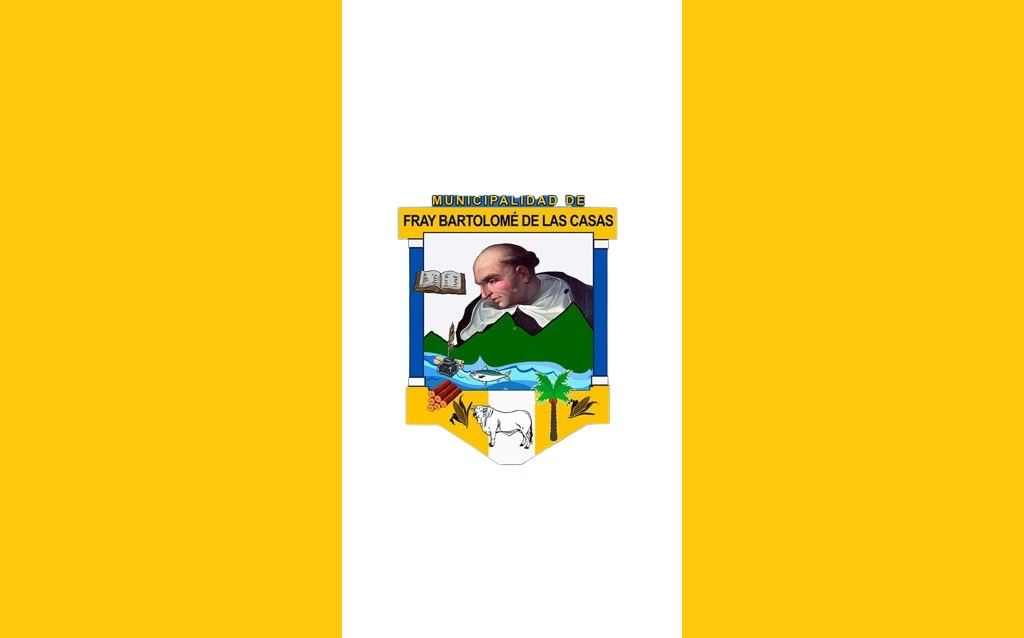
- Flag
- Motto: En el corazón de la Franja Transversal del Norte
- Location in Guatemala
- Coordinates: 15°50′44″N 89°51′57″W
- Country: Guatemala
- Department: Alta Verapaz

Population (2018 census)
  - Municipality: 66,141
  - Urban: 3,935
- Climate: Af

Fray Bartolomé de las Casas (Spanish pronunciation: [fɾaj βaɾtoloˈme ðe las ˈkasas]) is a municipality in the Guatemalan department of Alta Verapaz. The population is 66,141 in 2018. It lies at an altitude of 170m above sea level and covers an area of 1,229 km². The annual festival is April 30-May 4. It is named after the 15th-century Spanish priest, bishop, and writer Bartolomé de Las Casas.

== History ==
=== Franja Transversal del Norte ===
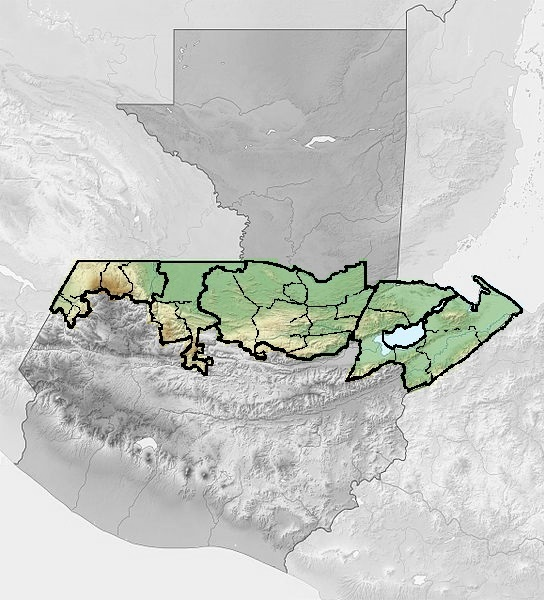
Location of Fray Bartolomé de las Casas in Franja Transversal del Norte

"It is of public interest and national emergency, the establishment of Agrarian Development Zones in the area included within the municipalities: San Ana Huista, San Antonio Huista, Nentón, Jacaltenango, San Mateo Ixtatán, and Santa Cruz Barillas in Huehuetenango; Chajul and San Miguel Uspantán in Quiché; Cobán, Chisec, San Pedro Carchá, Lanquín, Senahú, Cahabón and Chahal, in Alta Verapaz and the entire department of Izabal."

— Decree 60-70, first article.

The first settler project in the Franja Transversal del Norte (FTN) was in Sebol-Chinajá in Alta Verapaz. Sebol, then regarded as a strategic point and route through Cancuén river, which communicated with Petén through the Usumacinta River on the border with Mexico and the only road that existed was a dirt one built by President Lázaro Chacón in 1928. In 1958, during the government of General Miguel Ydígoras Fuentes the Inter-American Development Bank (IDB) financed infrastructure projects in Sebol. (Note: Sebol finally adopted the name "Fray Bartolomé de las Casas', municipality created in 1983 in Alta Verapaz.) In 1960, then Army captain Fernando Romeo Lucas García inherited Saquixquib and Punta de Boloncó farms in northeastern Sebol. In 1963 he bought the farm "San Fernando" El Palmar de Sejux and finally bought the "Sepur" farm near San Fernando. During those years, Lucas Garcia was in the Guatemalan legislature and lobbied heavily in Congress to boost investment in that area of the country.

In 1962, the DGAA became the National Institute of Agrarian Reform (INTA), by Decree 1551 which created the law of Agrarian Transformation. In 1964, INTA defined the geography of the FTN as the northern part of the departments of Huehuetenango, Quiché, Alta Verapaz and Izabal and that same year priests of the Maryknoll order and the Order of the Sacred Heart began the first process of colonization, along with INTA, carrying settlers from Huehuetenango to the Ixcán sector in Quiché.

The Northern Transversal Strip was officially created during the government of General Carlos Arana Osorio in 1970, by Decree 60-70 in the Congress, for agricultural development.

== Economy ==
=== African oil palm ===
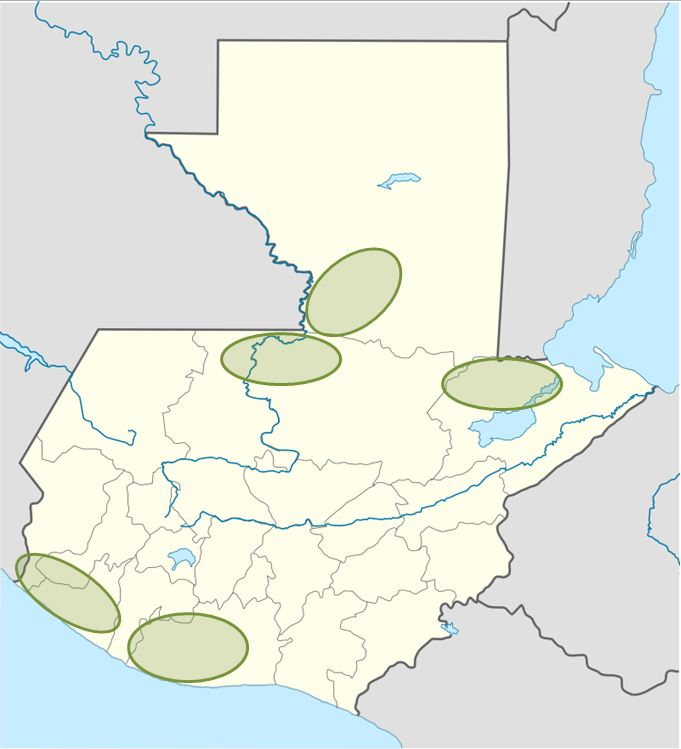
African oil palm plantation areas in Guatemala as of 2014.

There is a large demand within Guatemala and some of its neighbors for edible oils and fats, which would explain how the African oil palm became so prevalent in the country in detriment of other oils, and which has allowed new companies associated to large capitals in a new investment phase that can be found particularly in some territories that form the Northern Transversal Strip of Guatemala. The investors are trying to turn Guatemala into one of the main palm oil exporters, in spite of the decline on its international price. The most active region is found in Chisec and Cobán, in Alta Verapaz Department; Ixcán in Quiché Department, and Sayaxché, Petén Department, where Palmas del Ixcán, S.A. (PALIX) is located, both with its own plantation and those of subcontractors. Another active region is that of Fray Bartolomé de las Casas and Chahal in Alta Verapaz Department; El Estor and Livingston, Izabal Department; and San Luis, Petén, where Naturaceites operates.

== Climate ==
Fray Bartolomé de las Casas has a tropical rainforest climate (Köppen: Af).

Climate data for Fray Bartolomé de las Casas
Month	Jan	Feb	Mar	Apr	May	Jun	Jul	Aug	Sep	Oct	Nov	Dec	Year
Mean daily maximum °C (°F)	26.5 (79.7)	28.6 (83.5)	30.0 (86.0)	31.8 (89.2)	31.7 (89.1)	32.0 (89.6)	30.2 (86.4)	30.6 (87.1)	30.4 (86.7)	29.7 (85.5)	27.9 (82.2)	27.0 (80.6)	29.7 (85.5)
Daily mean °C (°F)	22.8 (73.0)	23.6 (74.5)	25.2 (77.4)	26.7 (80.1)	27.2 (81.0)	27.6 (81.7)	26.4 (79.5)	26.6 (79.9)	26.3 (79.3)	25.8 (78.4)	24.1 (75.4)	22.7 (72.9)	25.4 (77.8)
Mean daily minimum °C (°F)	19.1 (66.4)	18.7 (65.7)	20.5 (68.9)	21.6 (70.9)	22.7 (72.9)	23.2 (73.8)	22.7 (72.9)	22.6 (72.7)	22.3 (72.1)	22.0 (71.6)	20.4 (68.7)	18.5 (65.3)	21.2 (70.2)
Average precipitation mm (inches)	138 (5.4)	73 (2.9)	77 (3.0)	89 (3.5)	185 (7.3)	329 (13.0)	343 (13.5)	259 (10.2)	301 (11.9)	276 (10.9)	200 (7.9)	155 (6.1)	2,425 (95.6)
Source: Climate-Data.org

== See also ==
- Fernando Romeo Lucas García
- Franja Transversal del Norte

== Notes and references ==
=== Bibliography ===
- Solano, Luis (2012). Contextualización histórica de la Franja Transversal del Norte (FTN) (PDF) (in Spanish). Centro de Estudios y Documentación de la Frontera Occidental de Guatemala, CEDFOG. Archived from the original (PDF) on 13 November 2014.
- Solano, Luis (15 July 2015). "Palma Africana" (PDF). Revista Enfoque (36). Guatemala. Archived from the original (PDF) on 20 July 2015.
