= Chisec =

- Municipality
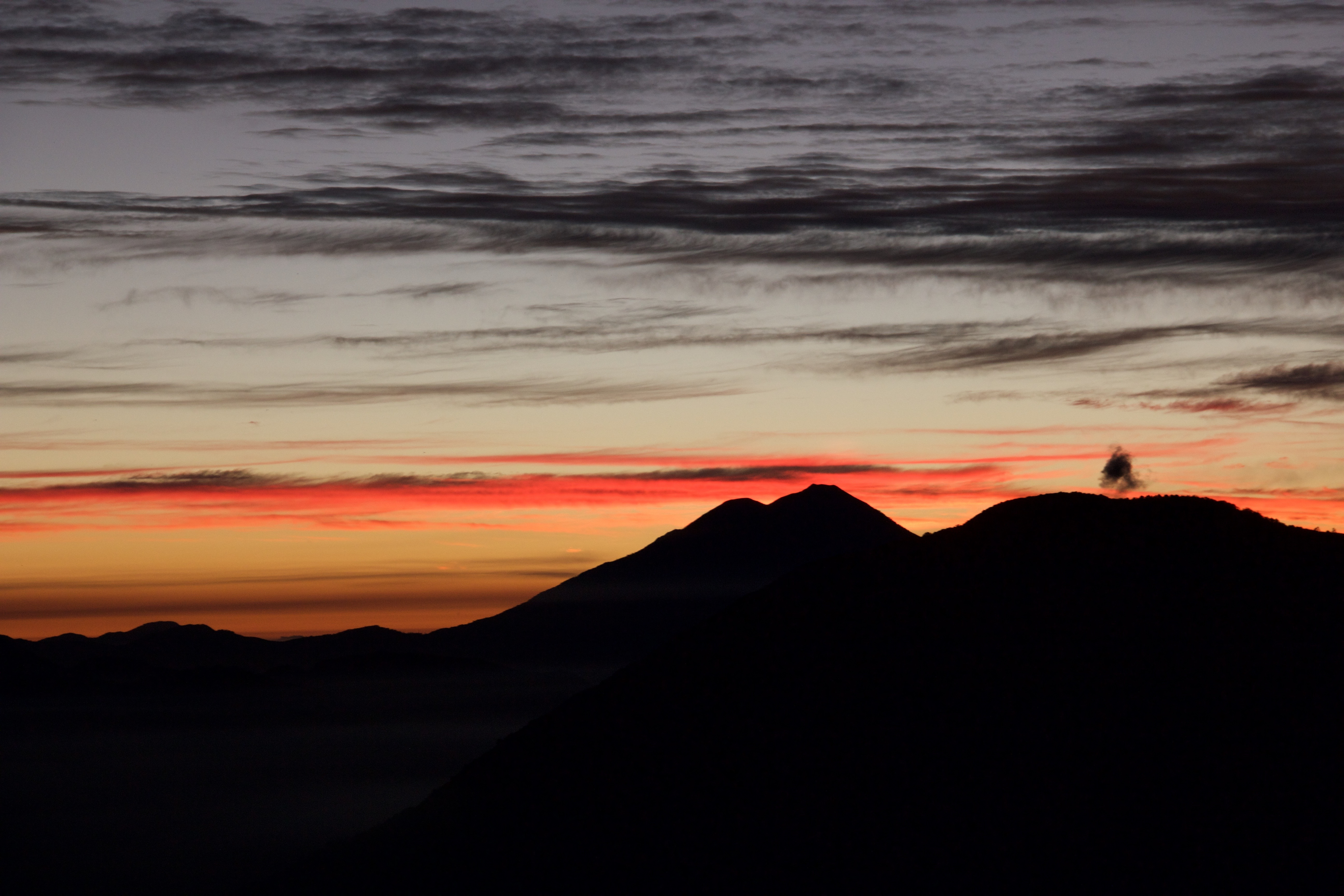

- Location in Guatemala
- Coordinates: 15°48′45″N 90°19′18″W
- Country: Guatemala
- Department: Alta Verapaz
- Municipality: Chisec

Government
  - Type: Municipal
  - Mayor: Fidencio Lima Pop (UCN)

Area
  - Municipality: 1,244 km^{2} (480 sq mi)
- Elevation: 230 m (750 ft)

Population (Census 2018)
  - Municipality: 84,553
  - Density: 67.97/km^{2} (176.0/sq mi)
  - Urban: 9,884
  - Ethnicities: Q'eqchi' Ladino
  - Religions: Roman Catholicism Evangelicalism Maya
- Climate: Af
- Website: munichisec.gob.gt

Chisec is a town and municipality in the north of the Guatemalan department of Alta Verapaz that was founded in 1813. It is situated at 230 metres (755 ft) above sea level. The municipality covers a territory of 1,244 km^{2}.

The 2018 census documented the population at 84,553. Approximately 95% of the municipality's inhabitants are Maya, spread over the town of Chisec and approximately 140 communities. There used to be closer to 240 communities, but a number of these have officially split off to the new municipality of Raxruha, created by the Guatemalan Congress in 2008. The Q'eqchi' language is widely spoken there alongside Spanish.

== History ==
=== Franja Transversal del Norte ===
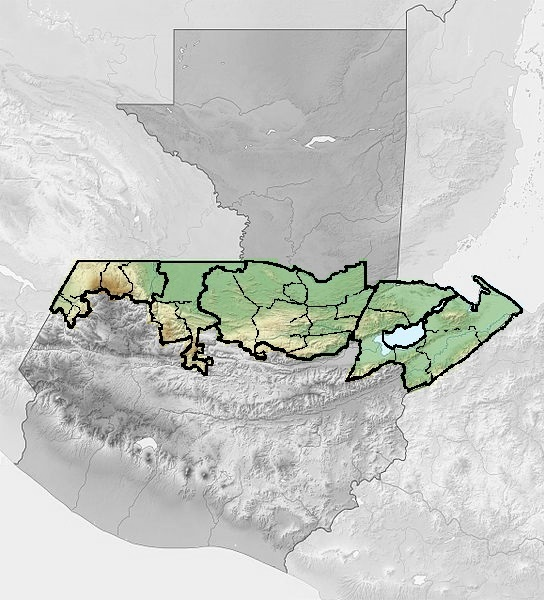
Location of Chisec in Franja Transversal del Norte
It is of public interest and national emergency, the establishment of Agrarian Development Zones in the area included within the municipalities: San Ana Huista, San Antonio Huista, Nentón, Jacaltenango, San Mateo Ixtatán, and Santa Cruz Barillas in Huehuetenango; Chajul and San Miguel Uspantán in Quiché; Cobán, Chisec, San Pedro Carchá, Lanquín, Senahú, Cahabón and Chahal, in Alta Verapaz and the entire department of Izabal.

Decree 60-70, first article.

The first settler project in the Franja Transversal del Norte (FTN) was in Sebol-Chinajá in Alta Verapaz. Sebol, then regarded as a strategic point and route through Cancuén river, which communicated with Petén through the Usumacinta River on the border with Mexico and the only road that existed was a dirt one built by President Lázaro Chacón in 1928. In 1958, during the government of General Miguel Ydígoras Fuentes the Inter-American Development Bank (IDB) financed infrastructure projects in Sebol. (Note: Sebol finally adopted the name "Fray Bartolomé de las Casas', municipality created in 1983 in Alta Verapaz.) In 1960, then Army captain Fernando Romeo Lucas García inherited Saquixquib and Punta de Boloncó farms in northeastern Sebol. In 1963 he bought the farm "San Fernando" El Palmar de Sejux and finally bought the "Sepur" farm near San Fernando. During those years, Lucas was in the Guatemalan legislature and lobbied in Congress to boost investment in that area of the country.

In 1962, the DGAA became the National Institute of Agrarian Reform (INTA), by Decree 1551 which created the law of Agrarian Transformation. In 1964, INTA defined the geography of the FTN as the northern part of the departments of Huehuetenango, Quiché, Alta Verapaz and Izabal and that same year priests of the Maryknoll order and the Order of the Sacred Heart began the first process of colonization, along with INTA, carrying settlers from Huehuetenango to the Ixcán sector in Quiché.

The Northern Transversal Strip was officially created during the government of General Carlos Arana Osorio in 1970, by Decree 60–70 in the Congress, for agricultural development.

== Economy ==
=== Oil potential ===
In 1971 the indigenous Q'eqchi's from 24 villages in the Cancuén area, in southern Petén and north of Chisec were evicted by the Army, because it was considered that the region was rich in oil.

Since 1974, oil had been commercially extracted in the FTN vicinity following discoveries made by Shenandoah Oil and Basic Resources, which were operating together in the Rubelsanto oil field in Alta Verapaz. In 1976, when ten president Kjell Laugerud Garcia came to visit the Mayalán cooperative in Ixcán, Quiché -which was formed just 10 years before- said: "Mayalán is seated on top of the gold", hinting that the North Transversal Strip would no longer be used for agriculture and the cooperative movement, but rather by strategic exploitation of natural resources. After that presidential visit, the two oil companies conducted exploration in Xacbal, near Mayalán in Ixcán, where they drilled the "San Lucas" well with unsuccessful results. These initial exploration, however, paved the way for future Ixcán and FTN oil experimentation, were also the main reason for building the dirt road that runs along the Strip. Shenandoah Oil, the National Institute of Agrarian Reform (INTA) and the Army Engineer Battalion coordinated the construction of that corridor between 1975 and 1979, which eventually allowed political, military and powerful businessmen of the time become owners of many lands where potential timber and oil wealth lay.

High Guatemalan government officers became large landowners and investors taking advantage of the peasant transfer policies, privileged insider information, expansion of public credit and major development projects; the Army entered the business world with the Bank of the Army, pension funds and others.

=== African oil palm ===
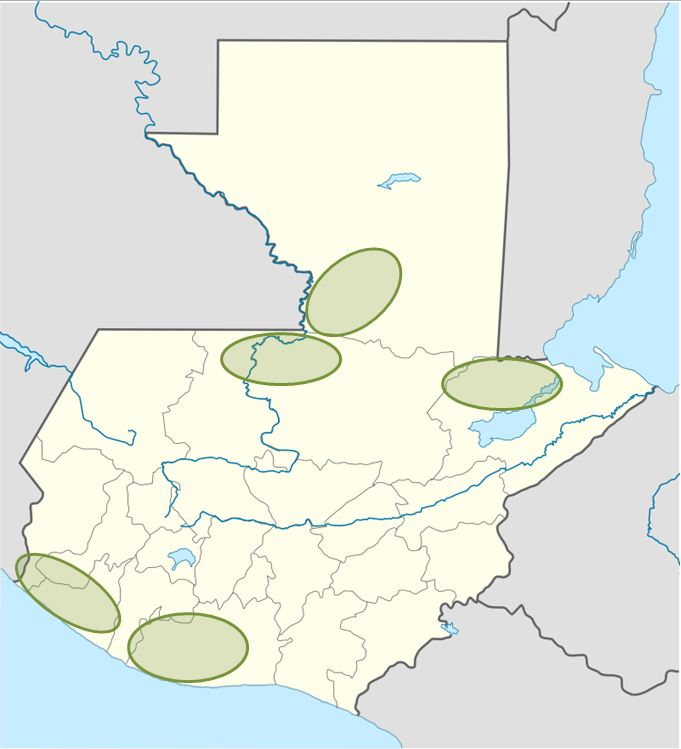
African oil palm plantation areas in Guatemala as of 2014.

There is a large demand within Guatemala and some of its neighbors for edible oils and fats, which would explain how the African oil palm became so prevalent in the country in detriment of other oils, and which has allowed new companies associated to large capitals in a new investment phase that can be found particularly in some territories that form the Northern Transversal Strip of Guatemala. The investors are trying to turn Guatemala into one of the main palm oil exporters, in spite of the decline on its international price. The most active region is found in Chisec and Cobán, in Alta Verapaz Department; Ixcán in Quiché Department, and Sayaxché, Petén Department, where Palmas del Ixcán, S.A. (PALIX) is located, both with its own plantation and those of subcontractors. Another active region is that of Fray Bartolomé de las Casas and Chahal in Alta Verapaz Department; El Estor and Livingston, Izabal Department; and San Luis, Petén, where Naturaceites operates.

== Climate ==
Chisec has a tropical climate (Köppen: Af).

Climate data for Chisec
Month	Jan	Feb	Mar	Apr	May	Jun	Jul	Aug	Sep	Oct	Nov	Dec	Year
Mean daily maximum °C (°F)	27.8 (82.0)	29.6 (85.3)	31.0 (87.8)	32.4 (90.3)	32.4 (90.3)	32.1 (89.8)	30.8 (87.4)	31.1 (88.0)	30.8 (87.4)	30.1 (86.2)	29.1 (84.4)	27.9 (82.2)	30.4 (86.8)
Daily mean °C (°F)	23.1 (73.6)	24.0 (75.2)	25.6 (78.1)	26.8 (80.2)	27.2 (81.0)	27.3 (81.1)	26.5 (79.7)	26.5 (79.7)	26.3 (79.3)	25.8 (78.4)	24.7 (76.5)	23.1 (73.6)	25.6 (78.0)
Mean daily minimum °C (°F)	18.4 (65.1)	18.4 (65.1)	20.2 (68.4)	21.2 (70.2)	22.1 (71.8)	22.5 (72.5)	22.2 (72.0)	22.0 (71.6)	21.9 (71.4)	21.5 (70.7)	20.3 (68.5)	18.3 (64.9)	20.8 (69.4)
Average precipitation mm (inches)	152 (6.0)	96 (3.8)	98 (3.9)	99 (3.9)	214 (8.4)	385 (15.2)	387 (15.2)	343 (13.5)	427 (16.8)	386 (15.2)	252 (9.9)	184 (7.2)	3,023 (119)
Source: Climate-Data.org

== See also ==
- Acala Ch'ol
- Fernando Romeo Lucas García
- Franja Transversal del Norte

== Notes and references ==
=== Bibliography ===
- Solano, Luis (2012). Contextualización histórica de la Franja Transversal del Norte (FTN) (PDF) (in Spanish). Centro de Estudios y Documentación de la Frontera Occidental de Guatemala, CEDFOG. Archived from the original (PDF) on 13 November 2014.
- Solano, Luis (15 July 2015). "Palma Africana" (PDF). Revista Enfoque (in Spanish) (36). Guatemala. Archived from the original (PDF) on 20 July 2015.
