= Ixcán =

- Municipality of Guatemala
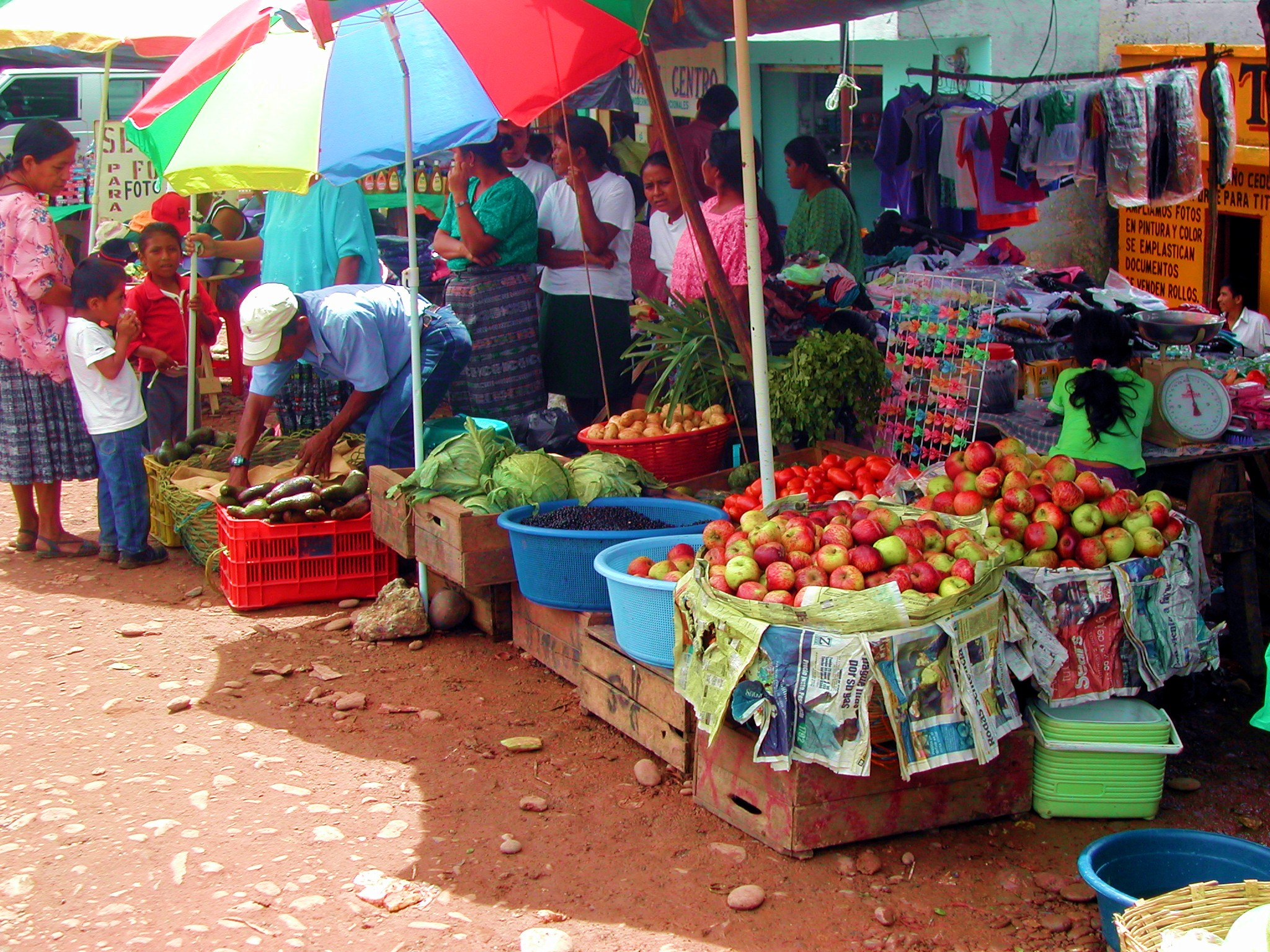
- The market in Playa Grande Ixcán

- Location in Guatemala
- Coordinates: 15°59′17″N 90°46′54″W
- Country: Guatemala
- Department: El Quiché
- Municipal Seat: Playa Grande Ixcán

Area
  - Municipality of Guatemala: 654 sq mi (1,693 km^{2})

Population (Census 2018)
  - Municipality of Guatemala: 99,470
  - Density: 152.2/sq mi (58.75/km^{2})
  - Urban: 12,710
  - Religions: Roman Catholicism Evangelicalism
- Climate: Af

Ixcán is a municipality in the Guatemalan department of El Quiché. Its administrative centre is the town of Playa Grande. The municipality consists of 176 communities, called aldeas. It has an area of 1,693 km^{2}. It is the northernmost municipality of El Quiché, and borders with Mexico, the municipalities of Chisec and Cobán of the Department of Alta Verapaz, the municipality of Santa Cruz Barillas of the Department of Huehuetenango, and the municipalities of Chajul and Uspantán of El Quiché.

Native Mayan languages include Qʼeqchiʼ, Qʼanjobʼal, Mam, Popti and Kʼicheʼ. Spanish is also common.

Its annual festival is held from 15 to 17 May.

Ixcán has an airport. Its International Air Transport Association code is PKJ. The population of the municipality was 99,470 at the 2018 census.

== History ==
=== Oil potential ===
In 1971 indigenous Q'eqchi' people from 24 villages in the Cancuén area, in southern Petén north of Chisec, were evicted by the Army, because it considered that the region was rich in oil.

Since 1974, oil had been commercially extracted in the FTN vicinity following discoveries made by Shenandoah Oil and Basic Resources, which were operating together in the Rubelsanto oil field in Alta Verapaz. In 1976, when ten president Kjell Laugerud García came to visit the Mayalán cooperative in Ixcán, Quiché -which was formed just 10 years before- said: "Mayalán is seated on top of the gold," hinting that the North Transversal Strip would no longer be used for agriculture and the cooperative movement, but rather by strategic exploitation of natural resources. After that presidential visit, the two oil companies conducted exploration in Xacbal, near Mayalán in Ixcán, where they drilled the "San Lucas" well with unsuccessful results. These initial exploration, however, paved the way for future Ixcán and FTN oil experimentation, were also the main reason for building the dirt road that runs along the Strip. Shenandoah Oil, the National Institute of Agrarian Reform (INTA) and the Army Engineer Battalion coordinated the construction of that corridor between 1975 and 1979, which eventually allowed political, military and powerful businessmen of the time become owners of many lands where potential timber and oil wealth lay.

High Guatemalan government officers became large landowners and investors taking advantage of the peasant transfer policies, privileged insider information, expansion of public credit and major development projects; the Army entered the business world with the Bank of the Army, pension funds and others.

=== Participation of Fernando Romeo Lucas García in FTN ===
In 1977, when he stepped down as defense minister to pursue his presidential campaign, general Fernando Romeo Lucas García also happened to hold the position of coordinator of the Northern Transversal Strip, whose main objective was to bring oil production and to facilitate oil exploitation of that vast land. By managing this project, Lucas García obtained greater knowledge and interaction with the transnational companies that were in the area, and increased his own personal economic interests in the region, given that his family owned land there and he had commercial relationships with Shenandoah Oil company.

During Lucas García government (1 July 1978 – 23 March 1982) the Army Engineers Battalion built the road stretch from Cadenas (Petén / Izabal) to Fray Bartolomé de las Casas.

After the overthrow of Lucas García March 23, 1982, a military triumvirate came to power headed by General Efraín Ríos Montt, along with Horacio Maldonado Shaad colonels and Francisco Gordillo. On June 2, 1982, international journalists conducted an interview with Ríos Montt, who said the following regarding Lucas García government and FTN:

1. What were the causes of the coup?
There were many causes; government had reached such decomposition that it was slashing its roots; it had no roots or the people or institutions. As a result, it fell; plain and simple.

2. Was there corruption in the previous government?
I understand that there was a lot of corruption. It came to the point with corruption, that Guatemala -being a country with great economic reserves- lost its economic reserves in two years; and also practically mortgaged the country with large constructions made -such as peripheral highway loops- which really had no concept of planning from the point of view of transit and traffic.

3. During Lucas García regime there were many social projects, much more than in previous governments, except in the revolutionary governments of (1944–1954). How will this government be different?
It was not Lucas Garcia, but the government itself; they gave lots on the banks of the Transversal del Norte, to get (farmers) out of land where there was oil. Then they got land because they bought it to keep the money from the farm sales. They grabbed these people and threw it over the Transversal del Norte, and that is why they built the road to the Transversal del Norte: to avoid protests of the people who were taken from their land, where there was oil.

== Civil war in Guatemala ==
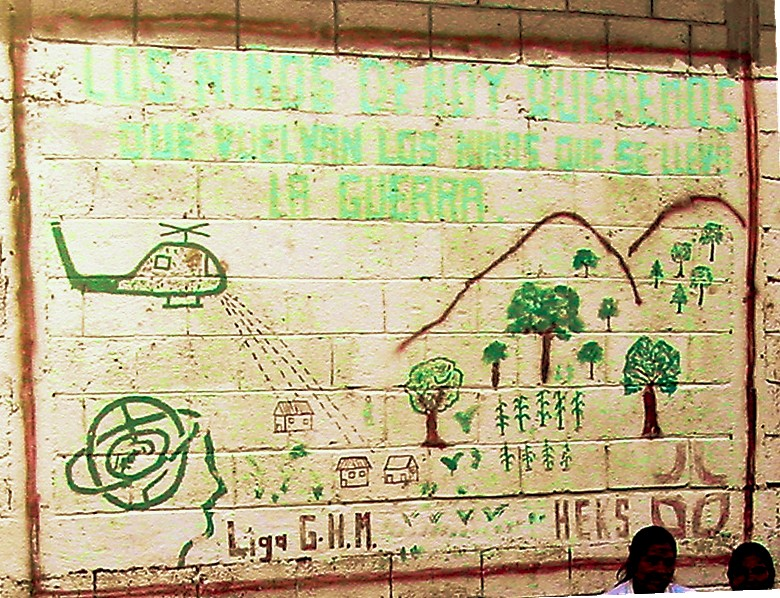
Pacifist mural depicting the Victory of January 20 in Ixcán

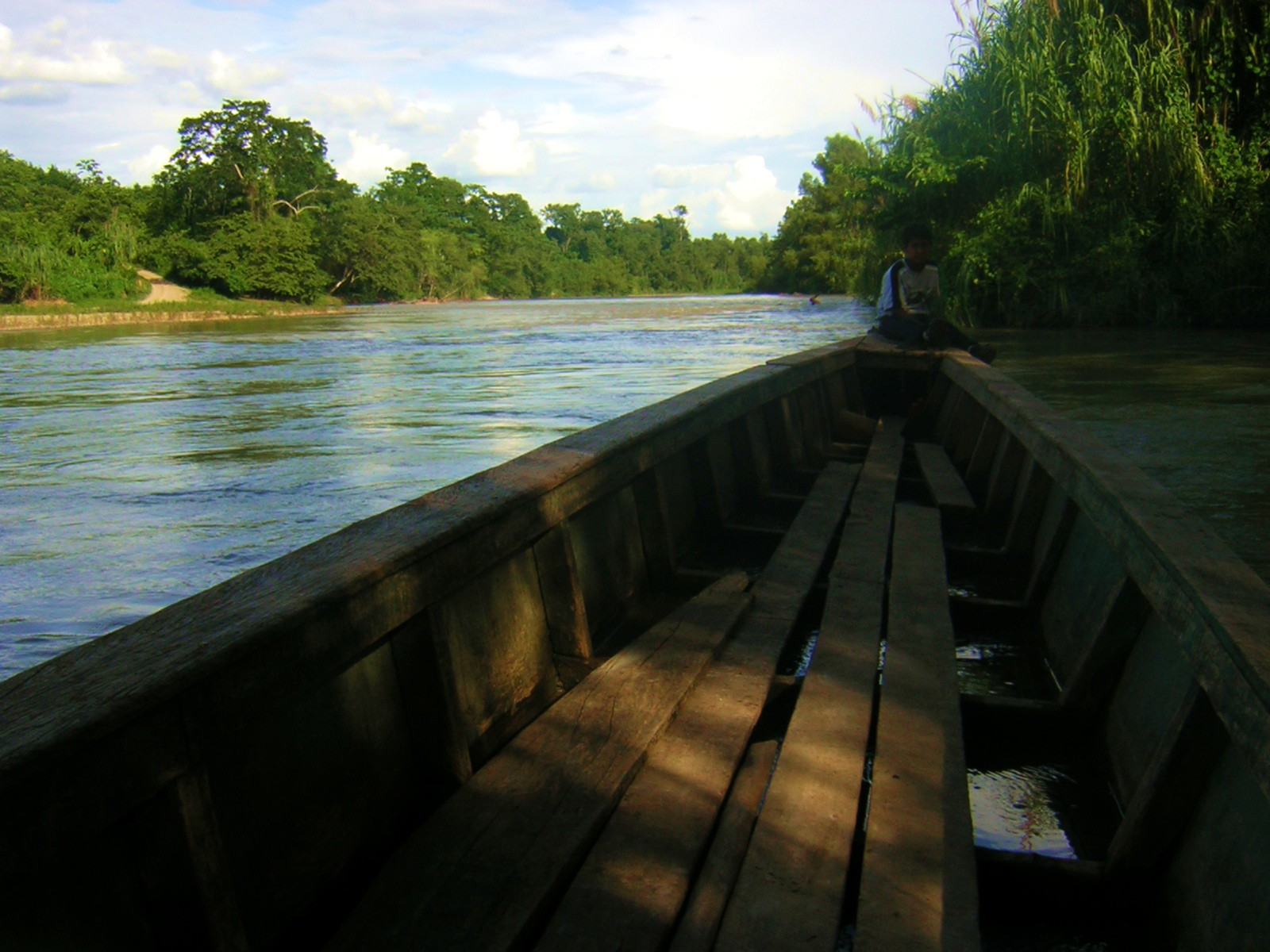
Xalbal River

=== The Guerrilla Army of the Poor ===
On January 19, 1972, members of a new Guatemalan guerrilla movement entered Ixcán, from Mexico, and were accepted by many farmers; in 1973, after an exploratory foray into the municipal seat of Cotzal, the insurgent group set up camp underground in the mountains of Xolchiché, in the municipality of Chajul.

In 1974 the insurgent guerrilla group held its first conference, and named itself the Guerrilla Army of the Poor (Ejército Guerrillero de los Pobres) (EGP). In 1975 the organization had spread around the area of the mountains of northern municipalities of Nebaj and Chajul. As part of its strategy EGP agreed to perform acts to seek notoriety and to symbolize the establishment of "social justice" against the inefficiency and ineffectiveness of the judicial and administrative organs of the State. They saw also that with these actions the indigenous rural population of the region identified with the insurgency, thus motivating them joining their ranks. This plan included so-called "executions". To determine who would be these people subject to "execution", the EGP attended complaints received from the public. For example, they selected two victims: Guillermo Monzón, a military Commissioner in Ixcán, and José Luis Arenas, the largest landowner in the area of Ixcán, reported to the EGP for allegedly having land conflicts with neighboring settlements and abusing their workers. (Note: José Luis Arenas, who at that time a journalist called "Ixcán Tiger" had been active in Guatemalan politics. He joined the Congress of Republic in the period of Jacobo Árbenz in the opposition; in 1952, he founded the Anti-communist Unification Party (AUP), which later became part of the liberationist movement; went into exile when the first armed clashes between the "Liberation Army" and the Guatemalan Army occurred, but returned with the victory of the National Liberation Movement and during the government of colonel Carlos Castillo Armas he held various public offices. In the presidential term of Carlos Arana Osorio (1970–1974) Arenas was in charge of the Promotion and Development of Petén (FYDEP). Later, he left politics for agriculture in his coffee and cardamom plantations in the Ixcán and Ixil, in Quiché.)

On Saturday, 7 June 1975, José Luis Arenas was killed by unknowns when he was at his farm, "La Perla", to pay wage workers. In front of his office approximately two to three hundred people waited for payment, and four members of the EGP mixed among farmers. The guerrillas destroyed the communication radio of the farm and executed Arenas. They spoke in Ixil language to the farmers, telling them that they were members of the Guerrilla Army of the Poor and had killed the "Tiger Ixcán." They requested to prepare beasts to help the injured and were transported to Chajul to receive medical care. Then the attackers fled towards Chajul.

José Luis Arenas' son, who was in San Luis Ixcán at the time, sought refuge on a nearby mountain, waiting for a plane to arrive to take him to the capital, to immediately report the matter to the Minister of Defense. The defense minister replied, "You are mistaken, there are no guerrillas in the area".

The report of the Recovery of Historical Memory lists 422 massacres committed by both sides in the conflict; however, it also states that they did the best they could in terms of obtaining information and therefore the list is incomplete; therefore here are the cases that have also been documented in other reports as well.

Chajul, Nebaj and Ixcán massacres during Guatemala Civil War
#	Location	Department	Date	Description
1	Ilom (village), Chajul	Quiché	23 March 1982	After 1981 repression against Ilom was rampant, ending with the massacre of 96 alleged guerilla members in front of their families on 23 March 1982, as part of Army "Victoria 82" plan. Soldiers were from the military base in "La Perla" while survivors fled and seek shelter in Comunidades de Población en Resistencia -Resistance population communities-.
2	Chel (village), Chajul	Quiché	3 April 1982	A part of operation "Victoria 82", Army soldiers from the military fort in "La Perla" rushed into Chel settlement, because it had been targeted as "subversive". The attack left 95 dead civilians.
3	Chisis (village), San Juan Cotzal	Quiché	13 February 1982	Chisís was a military target for the Army, who considered the village symbolic for the EGP and believed it was the guerrilla headquarters where the attacks in Chajul, Cotzal, and Nebaj had been planned. In January 1982, EGP attacked Cotzal military base; the attack lasted 2 hours and 20 minutes, resulting 100 military casualties and 20 for the guerilla. PAC and Army battalions, in revenge, completely destroy Chisis, leaving approximately 200 dead civilians behind.
4	Acul (village), Nebaj	Quiché	April 1982	Combat against EGP. There were 17 deaths.

Ixcán was severely affected by the Guatemalan Civil War during the 1970s and 1980s. Many inhabitants sought refuge in Mexico and the United States. In 1985, Ixcán was granted status as a separate municipality from San Miguel Uspantán.

== Economy ==
=== Xalalá hydroelectric dam ===
The Xalalá hydroelectric dam is a proposed development project in Ixcán. It is controversial because it will flood 31.8 km^{2} and displace twelve Q'eqchi' Maya communities. It is a project of the Plan Puebla Panama. The dam is opposed by the Organizational Commission of the Community Consultation of Good Faith in Ixcán, which wants the Instituto Nacional de Electrificación (INDE) to consult with local indigenous groups pursuant to the International Labour Organization Convention No. 169, Article 7. The municipal government called for such a consultation on 2007-04-20, in which 90% of voters rejected all proposed hydroelectric projects and petroleum extraction in the region.

=== African oil palm ===
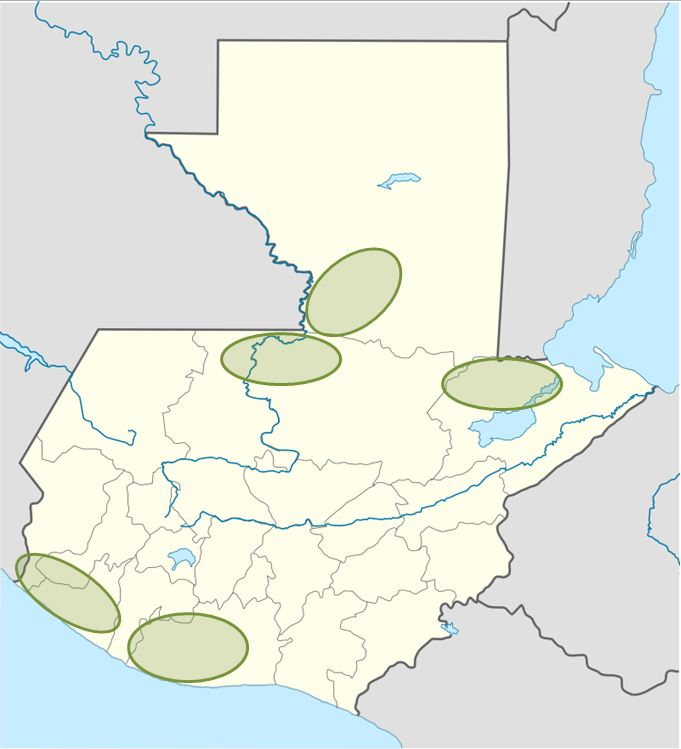
African oil palm plantation areas in Guatemala as of 2014

There is a large demand within Guatemala and some of its neighbors for edible oils and fats, which would explain how the African oil palm became so prevalent in the country in detriment of other oils, and which has allowed new companies associated to large capitals in a new investment phase that can be found particularly in some territories that form the Northern Transversal Strip of Guatemala. The investors are trying to turn Guatemala into one of the main palm oil exporters, in spite of the decline on its international price. The most active region is found in Chisec and Cobán, in Alta Verapaz Department; Ixcán in Quiché Department, and Sayaxché, Petén Department, where Palmas del Ixcán, S.A. (PALIX) is located, both with its own plantation and those of subcontractors. Another active region is that of Fray Bartolomé de las Casas and Chahal in Alta Verapaz Department; El Estor and Livingston, Izabal Department; and San Luis, Petén, where Naturaceites operates.

== Radio Stations ==
Radio stations in Playa Grande, Ixcán:

- Stereoixcan 90.3
- Sembrador 90.7

== Climate ==
Ixcán has a tropical rainforest climate (Köppen: Af).

Climate data for Ixcán
Month	Jan	Feb	Mar	Apr	May	Jun	Jul	Aug	Sep	Oct	Nov	Dec	Year
Mean daily maximum °C (°F)	29.2 (84.6)	30.6 (87.1)	32.2 (90.0)	33.4 (92.1)	33.4 (92.1)	32.4 (90.3)	31.5 (88.7)	31.8 (89.2)	31.3 (88.3)	30.6 (87.1)	30.0 (86.0)	29.0 (84.2)	31.3 (88.3)
Daily mean °C (°F)	23.6 (74.5)	24.3 (75.7)	25.9 (78.6)	27.1 (80.8)	27.6 (81.7)	27.1 (80.8)	26.5 (79.7)	26.6 (79.9)	26.3 (79.3)	25.8 (78.4)	24.9 (76.8)	23.5 (74.3)	25.8 (78.4)
Mean daily minimum °C (°F)	18.0 (64.4)	18.0 (64.4)	19.7 (67.5)	20.9 (69.6)	21.9 (71.4)	21.9 (71.4)	21.6 (70.9)	21.5 (70.7)	21.4 (70.5)	21.0 (69.8)	19.8 (67.6)	18.0 (64.4)	20.3 (68.6)
Average precipitation mm (inches)	118 (4.6)	87 (3.4)	76 (3.0)	83 (3.3)	199 (7.8)	448 (17.6)	449 (17.7)	437 (17.2)	526 (20.7)	440 (17.3)	224 (8.8)	166 (6.5)	3,253 (127.9)
Source: Climate-Data.org

== See also ==
- List of airports in Guatemala
- Uspantek language
