= Franja Transversal del Norte =

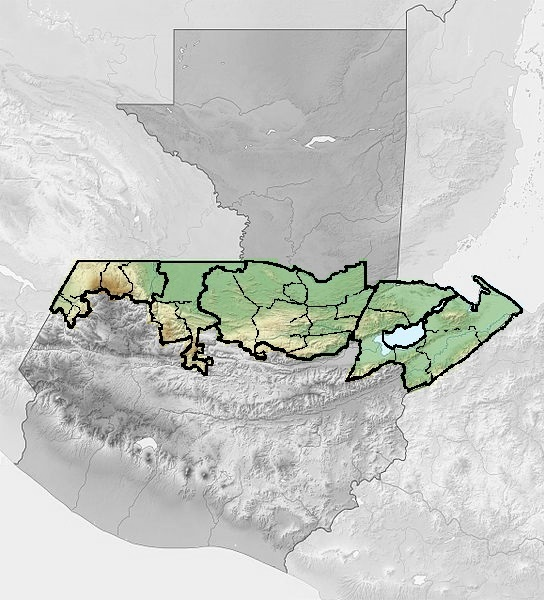
- Location of Franja Transversal del Norte within Guatemala
- Country: Guatemala
- Regions: Huehuetenango, Quiché, Alta Verapaz, Izabal

Area
  - Total: 15,750 km^{2} (6,080 sq mi)

Population (2010)
  - Total: 1,072,000
  - Density: 68.06/km^{2} (176.3/sq mi)

The Franja Transversal del Norte (English: Northern Transversal Strip) is a region in Guatemala delimited to the north by an imaginary line between Vértice de Santiago in Huehuetenango and Modesto Méndez Port in Izabal and in the south by La Mesilla in Huehuetenango and Izabal lake. It is composed, from west to east, of part of the Guatemalan departments of Huehuetenango, Quiché, Alta Verapaz and the entire department of Izabal. It extends roughly 15,750 km^{2}. During the Guatemalan Civil War, most of the massacres took place there due to the oil, mineral and precious wood reserves in the region. In the 21st century, there are projects to work in the region and a modern highway was built in 2010.

== Origins ==
=== Belgian colony ===
In 1840, Belgium began to act as an external source of support for Rafael Carrera's conservative movement, in an effort to exert influence in Central America. The Compagnie Belge de Colonisation (Belgian Colonization Company), commissioned by Belgian King Leopold I, became the administrator of Santo Tomas de Castilla in Izabal, replacing the failed British Eastern Coast of Central America Commercial and Agricultural Company. Even though the colony eventually crumbled due to the endemic diseases that plagued the area, Belgium continued to support Carrera in the mid-19th century, although Britain continued to be the main business and political partner of Carrera's regime.

Belgian colonization company in 1844

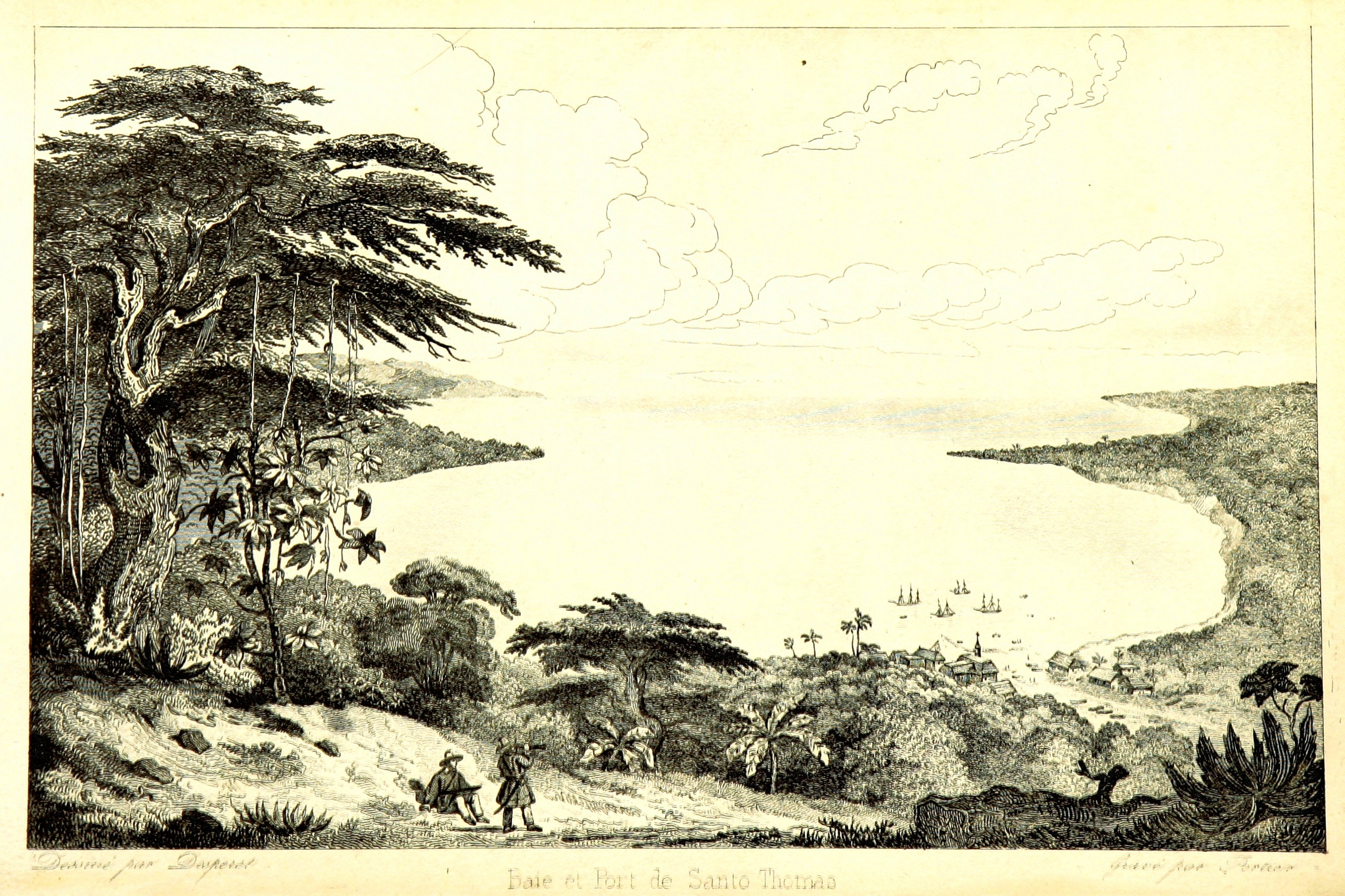
Santo Tomás de Castilla bay

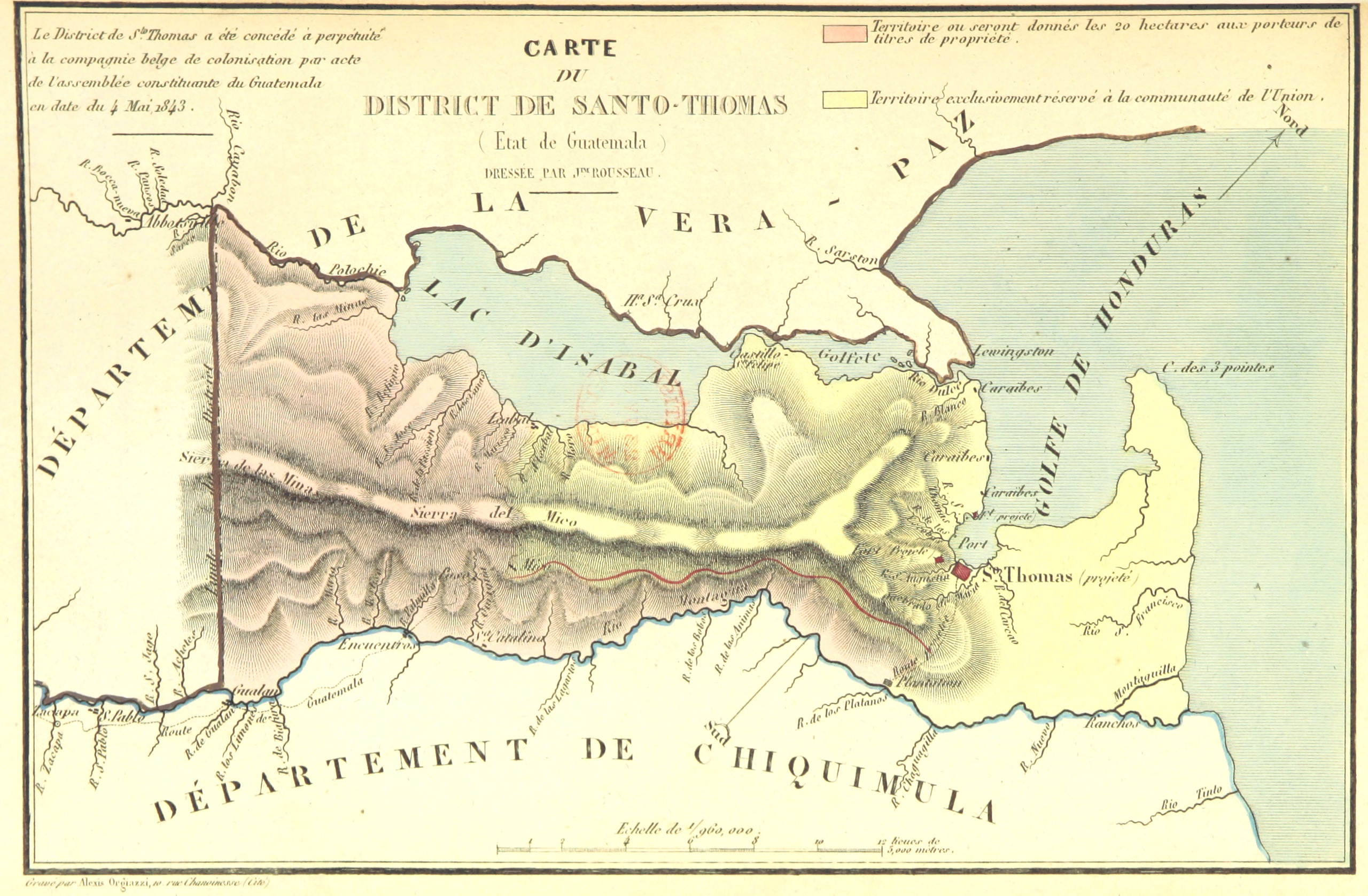
Izabal lake and Santo Tomás district. Area in yellow is what had been given in perpetuity to the catholic Belgians by Carrera's regime.

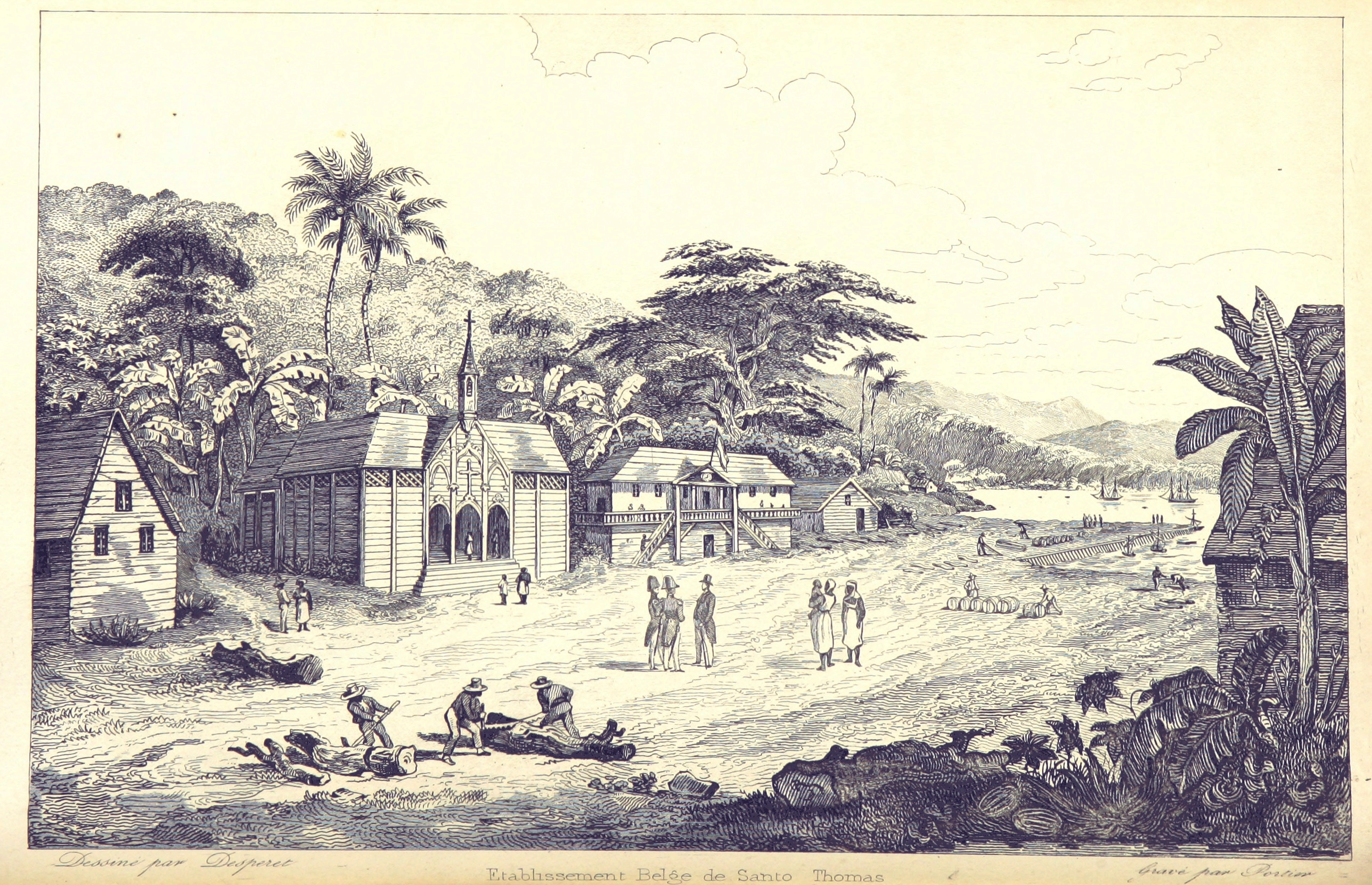
Santo Tomás town

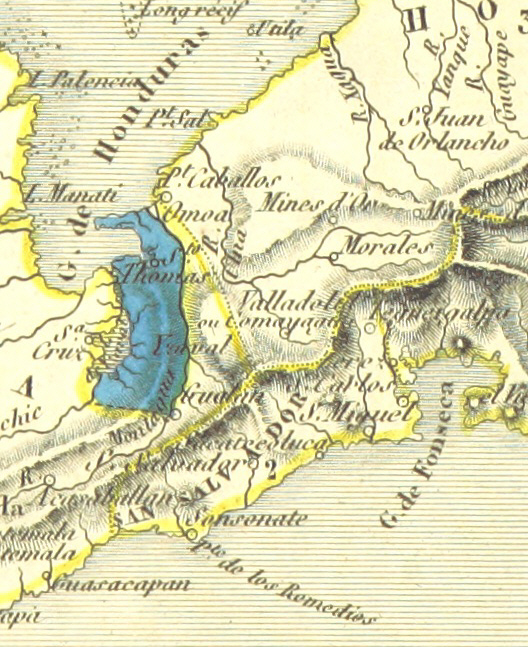
Map of the Belgian colony in Guatemala.

Maps and drawings made by Belgians. Oscar Berger Perdomo who was President of Guatemala between 2004 and 2008 descended from some of these first settlers.

=== German colony in Verapaz ===
As of 1850, Cobán, the capital of Alta Verapaz, had an estimated population of 12000. Around 1890, British archeologist Alfred Percival Maudslay and his wife came to Guatemala, and visited Cobán. Around the time the Maudslays visited Verapaz, a German colony had settled in the area thanks to generous concessions granted by liberal presidents Manuel Lisandro Barillas Bercián, José María Reyna Barrios and Manuel Estrada Cabrera. The Germans had a very united and solid community and had several activities in the German Club (Deutsche Verein), in Cobán, which they had founded in 1888. Their main commercial activity was coffee plantations. Maudslay described the Germans like this: "There is a larger proportion of foreigners in Coban than in any other towns in the Republic: they are almost exclusively Germans engaged in coffee-planting, and some few of them in cattle-ranching and other industries; although complaints of isolation and of housekeeping and labour troubles are not unheard of amongst them, they seemed to me to be fortunate from a business point of view in the high reputation that the Vera Paz coffee holds in the market, and the very considerable commercial importance which their industry and foresight has brought to the district; and, from a personal point of view, in the enjoyment of a delicious climate in which their rosy-cheeked children can be reared in health and strength, and in all the comforts which pertain to a life half European and half tropical. Hotels or fondas appear to be scarce; but the hospitality of the foreign residents is proverbial."

Cobán in the 1890s

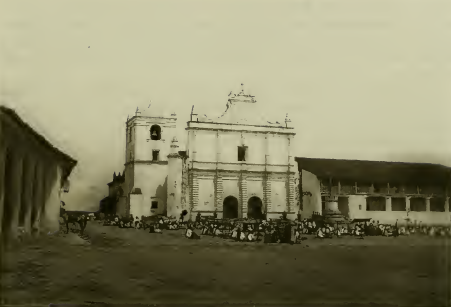
Central park church

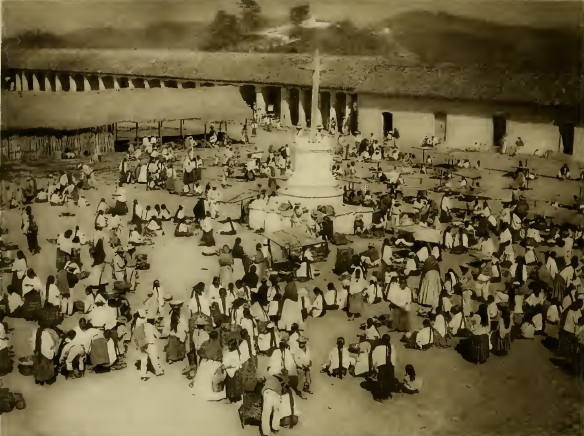
Street market

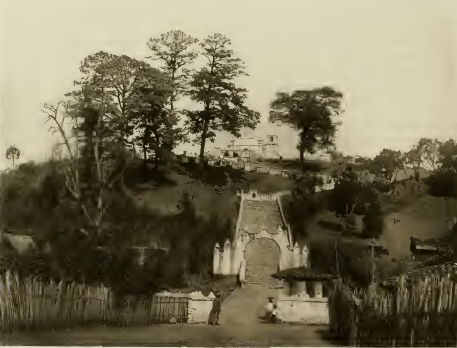
Calvary church

During the presidency of general José María Reina Barrios, British anthropologist Alfred Percival Maudslay and his wife visited Cobán and published these photographs in their book A Glimpse at Guatemala.

The city was developed by German coffee growers towards the end of the 19th century and was operated as a largely independent dominion until World War II. In 1888 a German club was founded and in 1935 a German school opened its doors in Cobán. Until 1930, about 2000 Germans populated the city. In 1941, all Germans were expelled by the Guatemalan government, led at the time by Jorge Ubico, because of pressure from the United States; it has also been suggested that Ubico wanted to seize control of the vast amounts of land Germans owned in the area. Many ended up in internment camps in Texas and were later traded for American POWs held in Germany. A sizable resident German population persists though, most completely assimilated into the Guatemalan culture through intermarriage. Multiple German architectural elements still remain throughout Cobán.

The Germans also set up Ferrocarril Verapaz, a railway which connected Cobán with Lake Izabal, operated from 1895 until 1963 and was a symbol for the wealth in this coffee-growing region those days.

==== During the Nazi era ====
While the Nazis were in power in Germany (1933–1945), rumors circulated in Guatemala that the Germans in Verapaz wanted to establish themselves as a national socialist "new Germany". The Germans had acquired land, houses and farms through concessions from the liberal presidents who ruled from 1885 to 1920 in Guatemala and enjoyed privileges during the dictatorship of General Jorge Ubico, who admired the fascist policies of Benito Mussolini in Italy and Francisco Franco in Spain and the Nazism of Hitler in Germany.

An incident involving the German community in Verapaz occurred when Nazi Germany asked its citizens to vote on the annexation of Austria to Germany: a German ship anchored in Puerto Barrios for this activity and those who attended were "counted" as Nazi supporters.

==== During World War II ====
Tension increased when World War II between Germany, France and England started in 1939 with the German invasion of Poland and came to a critical point when Japan, an ally of the Germans, attacked the US military base of Pearl Harbor in Oahu, Hawaii on 7 December 1941. When the United States entered the war, it forced President Jorge Ubico to expel all Germans from Guatemala and to confiscate all of their properties. The United States had a strong influence on the Guatemalan government, through concessions granted to American companies, such as the United Fruit Company who had a monopoly on the export of bananas and which practically paid no taxes to Guatemala, and that of railway transport through its subsidiary International Railroads of Central America (IRCA). The fruit company was the strongest pillar of Ubico's regime and was part of the American policy for the region since President Teddy Roosevelt started negotiations with Colombia to build the Panama Canal in 1903. German males also were forced to leave their country and forced into the ranks of the German army. Guatemalan historian Francis Polo Sifontes wrote that during the Second World War many Germans were called for military service in his country. After the war, some were imprisoned in concentration camps in Russia, and others claimed to be Guatemalans to avoid prison.

There are a number of names that Germans bequeathed their children; due to the mix with the Maya-Q'eqchi' population, many German names have remained in Q'eqchi' people since. (Note: Among the common German last names in Guatemala are: – Stubbs, Brocke, Droeger, Hengstenberg, Lantzendorffer, Fritz, Wholers, Weyman, Dieseldorff, Sapper, Foucht, Wellmann, Majus, Quirin, Nisthal, Fraatz, Kress, Droege, Hoenes, Turckheim, Duering, Hummler, Stanley, Moll, Moeschler, Diemecke, Maas, Rummler, Hasse, Sarg, Sapper, Mittelstaedt, Daetz, Gelpke, Kufeld, Wasem, Wranger, Euler, Buechsel, Spiegeler, Winter, Thomae, Fetzer, Burmester, Wagner, Hoenes.)

=== After the overthrow of Jacobo Árbenz ===
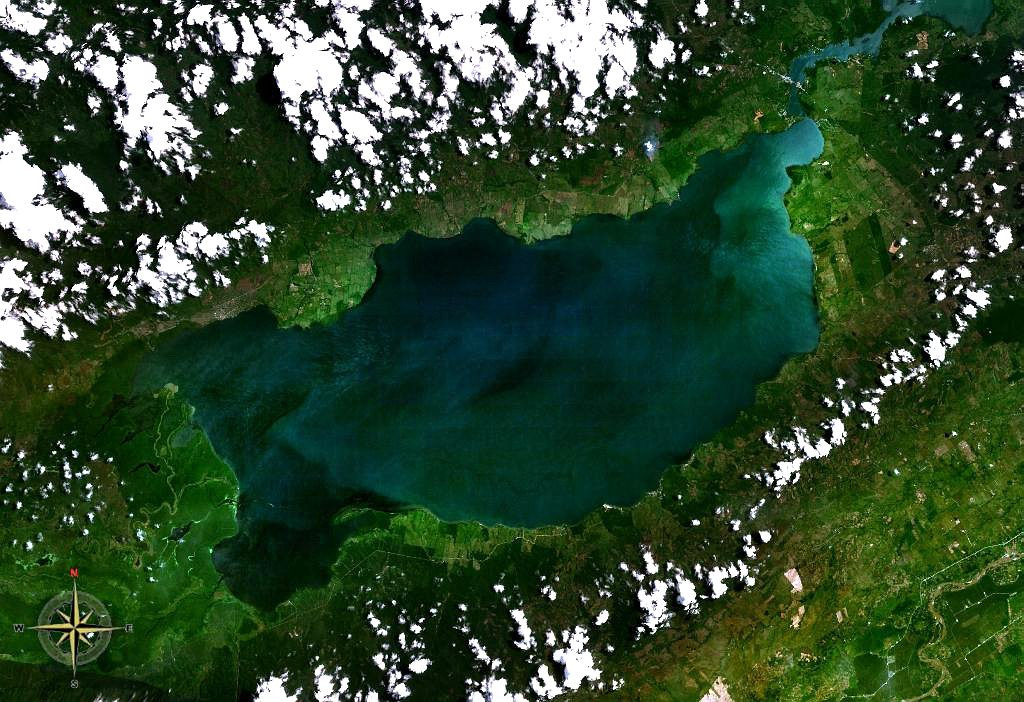
Izabal Lake in Guatemala. Originally, was the east border of the Northern Transversal Strip.

After the counterrevolution of 1954, the Guatemalan government established the Council for Economic Planning and started using free-market strategies, advised by the World Bank and the International Cooperation Administration (ICA) of United States government. CNPE and ICA created the Directorate General of Land Affairs (DGAA) which was responsible for dismantling and negating the effects of Decree 900 of Agragia Government Reform created by Jacobo Árbenz. In 1959, Decree 1286 was passed into law and created the National Development Corporation and Economic Development of Petén (FYDEP), an agency of the Presidency of the Republic, responsible for colonization in the department of Petén. In practice, however, FYDEP was directed by the military and was an agency of the Ministry of Defense, while in parallel DGAA handled the geographical strip bordering on the departmental boundary of Petén and the borders of Belize, Honduras and Mexico and which eventually became the Northern Transversal Strip.

The first settler project in the FTN was in Sebol-Chinajá in Alta Verapaz. Sebol, then regarded as a strategic point and route through Cancuén River, which communicated with Petén through the Usumacinta River on the border with Mexico. The only road that existed was a dirt one built by President Lázaro Chacón in 1928. In 1958, during the government of General Miguel Ydígoras Fuentes the Inter-American Development Bank (IDB) financed infrastructure projects in Sebol. (Note: Sebol finally adopted the name "Fray Bartolomé de las Casas', a municipality created in 1983 in Alta Verapaz.) In 1960, then-Army captain Fernando Romeo Lucas García inherited Saquixquib and Punta de Boloncó farms in northeastern Sebol. In 1963 he bought the farm "San Fernando" El Palmar de Sejux and finally bought the "Sepur" farm near San Fernando. During those years, Lucas was in the Guatemalan legislature and lobbied in Congress to boost investment in that area of the country.

In those years, the importance of the region was in livestock, exploitation of precious export wood and archaeological wealth. Timber contracts were granted to multinational companies such as Murphy Pacific Corporation from California, which invested US$30 million for the colonization of southern Petén and Alta Verapaz, and formed the North Impulsadora Company. Colonization of the area was made a process by which inhospitable areas of the FTN were granted to native peasants.

In 1962, the DGAA became the National Institute of Agrarian Reform (INTA), by Decree 1551 which created the law of Agrarian Transformation. In 1964, INTA defined the geography of the FTN as the northern part of the departments of Huehuetenango, Quiché, Alta Verapaz and Izabal and that same year priests of the Maryknoll order and the Society of the Sacred Heart began the first process of colonization along with INTA, carrying settlers from Huehuetenango to the Ixcán sector in Quiché.

"It is of public interest and national emergency, the establishment of Agrarian Development Zones in the area included within the municipalities: Santa Ana Huista, San Antonio Huista, Nentón, Jacaltenango, San Mateo Ixtatán, and Santa Cruz Barillas in Huehuetenango; Chajul and San Miguel Uspantán in Quiché; Cobán, Chisec, San Pedro Carchá, San Agustín Lanquín, Senahú, Cahabón and Chahal, in Alta Verapaz and the entire department of Izabal."

— Decreto 60–70, artítulo 1o.

The Northern Transversal Strip was officially created during the government of General Carlos Arana Osorio in 1970, by Decree 60–70 of the Congress, for agricultural development.

=== Oil potential ===
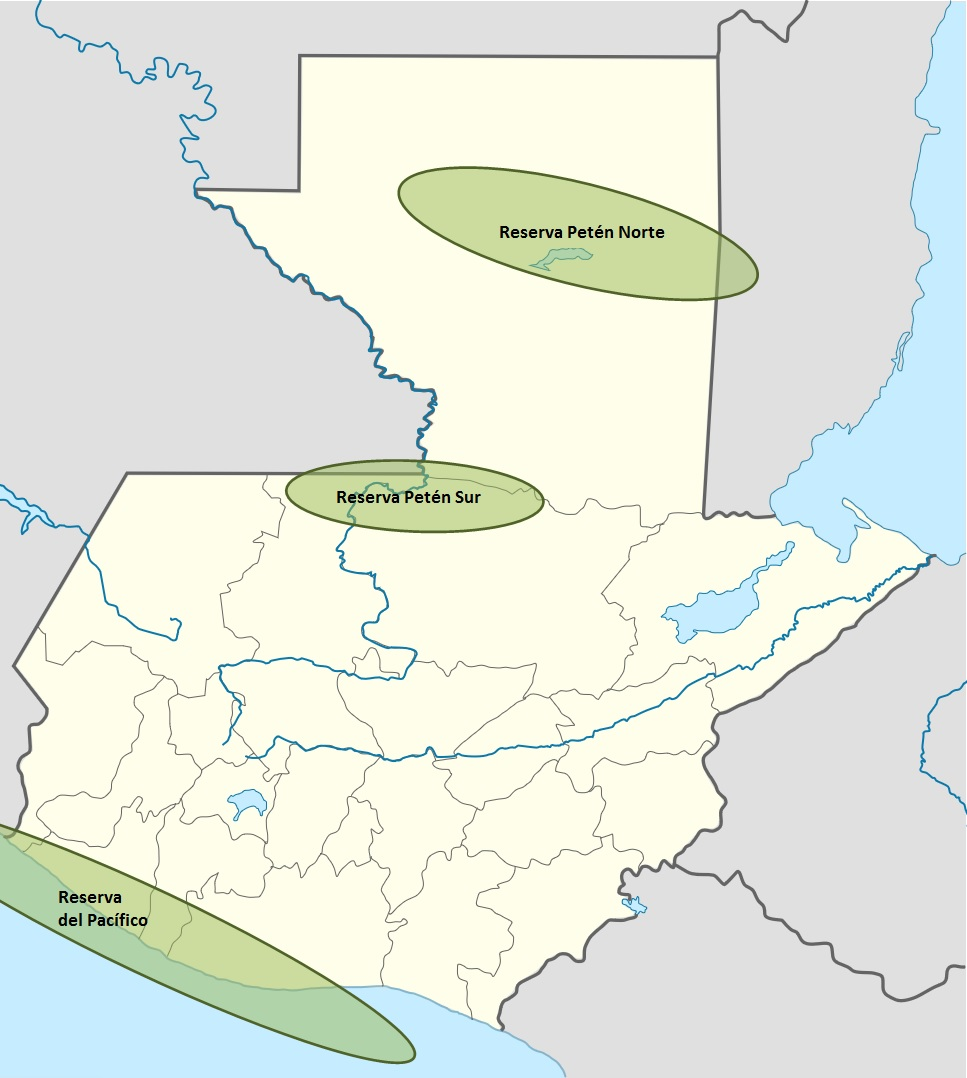
Guatemala oil reserves.

In 1971 indigenous Q'eqchi' people from 24 villages in the Cancuén area, in southern Petén and the north of Chisec were evicted by the Army because the region was rich in oil.

Since 1974, oil had been commercially extracted in the FTN vicinity following discoveries made by Shenandoah Oil and Basic Resources, which together operated the Rubelsanto oil field in Alta Verapaz. In 1976, when then-president Kjell Laugerud Garcia came to visit the Mayalán cooperative in Ixcán, Quiché—which had been formed just 10 years before—said: "Mayalán is seated on top of the gold", hinting that the North Transversal Strip would no longer be used for agriculture and the cooperative movement, but rather for strategic exploitation of natural resources. After that visit, the two oil companies conducted explorations in Xacbal, near Mayalán in Ixcán, where they drilled the "San Lucas" well with unsuccessful results. These initial explorations, however, paved the way for future Ixcán and FTN oil experiments, and were also the main reason for building the dirt road that runs along the Strip. Shenandoah Oil, the National Institute of Agrarian Reform (INTA) and the Army Engineer Battalion coordinated the construction of that corridor between 1975 and 1979, which eventually allowed political, military and powerful businessmen of the time become owners of many lands where potential timber and oil wealth lay.

High Guatemalan government officers became large landowners and investors taking advantage of peasant transfer policies, privileged insider information, expansion of public credit and major development projects; the Army entered the business world with the Bank of the Army, pension funds and others.

== Participation of Fernando Romeo Lucas García in FTN ==
In 1977, when he stepped down as defense minister to pursue his presidential campaign, general Fernando Romeo Lucas García also held the position of coordinator of the megaproject of the Northern Transversal Strip, whose main objective was to facilitate oil exploitation. By managing this project, Lucas García obtained greater knowledge and interaction with the transnational companies that were in the area, and increased his own personal economic interests in the region, given that his family owned land there and he had commercial relationships with Shenandoah Oil company.

=== Cuchumaderas case ===
In 1977 the municipality of San Mateo Ixtatán signed a contract with the Cuchumaderas company for the "sanitation, reforestation, maintenance and exploitation of forests, based on the urgent need to build and maintain natural resources attacked by the pine beetle." Upon learning of the negotiation between the municipality and the company, town people forced the authorities to conduct an open meeting and explain the characteristics of the commitment; each of the members of the municipal corporation gave their account of the negotiation, showing contradictions that led to resignation of the mayor at the very same meeting. Despite threats received by some residents of San Mateo, they organized a local committee to defend the forest, and started a lawsuit against the company. As a result, forest extraction processes were stopped.

Cuchumaderas was closely related to the interests of the military leaders who held political power in the 1970s, and spread throughout the defined territory of the FTN; the forest wealth of San Mateo Ixtatán made it the target of economic interests in the Northern Transversal Strip. Ronald Hennessey, pastor of San Mateo Ixtatán during the Guatemalan Civil War, arrived in October 1980 amid people's fight against the presence of Cuchumaderas and accused in his writings as Cuchumaderas partners the following people: Lucas Garcia, FTN director when Cuchumaderas was founded, general Otto Spiegler Noriega, who was the Chief of Staff of the Army and later became Minister of Defense under Lucas García; Jorge Spiegler Noriega, manager of the National Forestry Institute (INAFOR), and then-colonel Rodolfo Lobos Zamora, commander of Military Zone of Quiché. However, later in the Commercial Register investigations showed that the owner of the company was a different person: it was the engineer Fernando Valle Arizpe. (Note: Valle Arizpe died on 26 October 2010 and was well known for having been the husband of journalist Irma Flaquer until 1965) Valle Arizpe had developed close relationships with senior officials and senior members of the government of Lucas García, especially Donaldo Alvarez Ruiz, the Minister of Interior. (Note: Given his wealthy family, Valle Arizpe could afford the services of Alvarez as lawyer from the time the latter graduated; over the years, their continuous dealings led to a strong friendship.)

During the Lucas García government (1 July 1978 – 23 March 1982) the Army Engineers Battalion built the road stretching from Cadenas (Petén / Izabal) to Fray Bartolomé de las Casas.

After the overthrow of Lucas Garcia on March 23, 1982, a military triumvirate headed by general Efraín Ríos Montt, along with colonels Horacio Maldonado Shaad and Francisco Gordillo rose to power. On June 2, 1982, international journalists conducted an interview with Ríos Montt, who said the following regarding Lucas García government and FTN:

1. What were the causes of the coup?
There were many causes; government had reached such decomposition that it was slashing its roots; it had no roots or the people or institutions. As a result, it fell; plain and simple.

2. Was there corruption in the previous government?
I understand that there was a lot of corruption. It came to the point with corruption, that Guatemala – being a country with great economic reserves – lost its economic reserves in two years; and also practically mortgaged the country with large constructions made – such as peripheral highway loops – which really had no concept of planning from the point of view of transit and traffic.

3. During Lucas García regime there were many social projects, much more than in previous governments, except in the revolutionary governments of (1944–1954). How will this government be different?
It was not Lucas Garcia, but the government itself; they gave lots on the banks of the Transversal del Norte, to get (farmers) out of land where there was oil. Then they got land because they bought it to keep the money from the farm sales. They grabbed these people and threw it over the Transversal del Norte, and that is why they built the road to the Transversal del Norte: to avoid protests of the people who were taken from their land, where there was oil.

== Civil war in Guatemala ==
=== The Guerrilla Army of the Poor ===
On January 19, 1972, members of a new Guatemalan guerrilla movement entered Ixcán from Mexico, and were accepted by many farmers; in 1973, after an explorative foray into the municipal seat of Cotzal, the insurgent group decided to set up camp underground in the mountains of Xolchiché, municipality of Chajul.

In 1974 the insurgent guerrilla group held its first conference, where it defined its strategy of action for the coming months and called itself Guerrilla Army of the Poor (-Ejército Guerrillero de los Pobres -EGP-). In 1975 the organization had spread around the area of the mountains of northern municipalities of Nebaj and Chajul. As part of its strategy EGP agreed to perform acts that notoriety was obtained and through which also symbolize the establishment of a "social justice" against the inefficiency and ineffectiveness of the judicial and administrative organs of the State. They saw also that with these actions the indigenous rural population of the region is identified with the insurgency, thus motivating joining their ranks. As part of this plan was agreed to so-called "executions". To determine who would be these people subject to "execution", the EGP attended complaints received from the public. For example, they selected two victims: Guillermo Monzón, who was a military Commissioner in Ixcán and José Luis Arenas, the largest landowner in the area of Ixcán, and who had been reported to the EGP for allegedly having land conflicts with neighboring settlements and abusing their workers. (Note: José Luis Arenas, who at that time a journalist called "Ixcán Tiger" had been active in Guatemalan politics. He joined as Congress of Republic in the period of Jacobo Arbenz in the opposition; in 1952, he founded the Anti-communist Unification Party (AUP), which later became part of the liberationist movement; went into exile when the first armed clashes between the "Liberation Army" and the Guatemalan Army occurred, but returned with the victory of the National Liberation Movement and during the government of colonel Carlos Castillo Armas he held various public offices. In the presidential term of Carlos Arana Osorio (1970–1974) Arenas was in charge of the Promotion and Development of Petén (FYDEP). Later, he left politics for agriculture in his coffee and cardamom plantations in the Ixcán and Ixil, in Quiché.)

On Saturday, 7 June 1975, José Luis Arenas was killed by unknowns when he was in the premises of his farm "La Perla" to pay wage workers. In front of his office there were approximately two to three hundred people to receive their payment and four members of EGP mixed among farmers. Subsequently, the guerrilla members destroyed the communication radio of the farm and executed Arenas. After having murdered José Luis Arenas, guerrilla members spoke in Ixil language to the farmers, informing them that they were members of the Guerrilla Army of the Poor and had killed the "Tiger Ixcán." They requested to prepare beasts to help the injured and were transported to Chajul to receive medical care. Then the attackers fled towards Chajul.

José Luis Arenas' son, who was in San Luis Ixcán at the time, seek refuge in a nearby mountain, waiting for a plane to arrive to take him to the capital, to immediately report the matter to the Minister of Defense. The defense minister replied, "You are mistaken, there are no guerrillas in the area".

=== Panzós massacre ===
In Alta Verapaz in the late nineteenth century German farmers came to concentrate in their hands three-quarters of the total 8686 km^{2} area of the department. In this department came insomuch land grabbing and women [slaves] by German agricultural entrepreneurs, a political leader noted that farmers disappeared from their villages overnight, fleeing the farmers.

— Julio Castellanos Cambranes

Also located in the Northern Transversal Strip, the valley of the Polochic River had been inhabited since ancient times by k'ekchí and P'okomchi people. In the second half of the nineteenth century, President Justo Rufino Barrios (1835–1885) allocated land in the area to German farmers. Decree 170 (Census Redemption Decree) facilitated the expropriation of Indian land in favor of the Germans, because it promoted the auction of communal lands. Since that time, the main economic activity has been export-oriented, especially coffee, bananas and cardamom. Communal property used for subsistence farming became private property which led to the cultivation and mass marketing of agricultural products. Therefore, the fundamental characteristic of the Guatemalan production system has since that time been the accumulation of property in few hands, and a sort of "farm servitude" based on the exploitation of "farmer settlers". (Note: According to Guatemalan leftists, this is only a euphemism to refer to "native slaves".)

In 1951, an agrarian reform law that expropriated idle land from private ownership was enacted, but in 1954, with the National Liberation Movement coup supported by the United States, most of the expropriated land was awarded back to its former landowners. Flavio Monzón was appointed mayor and in the next twenty years he became one of the largest landowners in the area. In 1964, several communities settled for decades on the shore of Polochic River claimed property titles to INTA which was created in October 1962, but the land was awarded to Flavio Monzón. A Mayan peasant from Panzós later said that Flavio Monzón "got the signatures of the elders before he went before INTA to talk about the land. When he returned, gathered the people and said that, by an INTA mistake, the land had gone to his name." Throughout the 1970s, Panzós farmers continued to claim INTA regularization of land ownership, receiving legal advice from the FASGUA (Autonomous Trade Union Federation of Guatemala), an organization that supported the peasants' demands through legal procedures. However, no peasant received a property title, ever. Some obtained promises while others got provisional property titles, and also some only received permission to plant. The peasants began to suffer evictions from their land by farmers, the military and local authorities in favor of the economic interests of Izabal Mining Operations Company (EXMIBAL) and Transmetales. (Note: Another threat at that time for peasant proprietors were mining projects and exploration of oil: Exxon, Shenandoah, Hispanoil and Getty Oil all had exploration contracts; besides there was the need for territorial expansion of two megaprojects of that era: Northern Transversal Strip and Chixoy Hydroelectric Plant.)

In 1978 a military patrol was stationed a few kilometers from the county seat of Panzós, in a place known as "Quinich". At this time organizational capacity of peasant had increased through committees who claimed titles to their land, a phenomenon that worried the landlord sector. Some of these owners -among them Flavio Monzón- stated: "Several peasants living in the villages and settlements want to burn urban populations to gain access to private property", and requested protection from Alta Verapaz governor. (Note: In the municipal minutes labeled 34–64 (published 9 January 1965) one can see the first indication of military presence in the region, when it was written that it was imperative to incorporate order and security in the area.)

On 29 May 1978, peasants from Cahaboncito, Semococh, Rubetzul, Canguachá, Sepacay villages, finca Moyagua and neighborhood La Soledad, decided to hold a public demonstration in the Plaza de Panzós to insist on the claim of land and to express their discontent caused by the arbitrary actions of the landowners and the civil and military authorities. Hundreds of men, women, indigenous children went to the square of the municipal seat of Panzós, carrying their tools, machetes and sticks. One of the people who participated in the demonstration states: "The idea was not to fight with anyone, what was required was the clarification of the status of the land. People came from various places and they had guns."

There are different versions on how the shooting began: some say it began when "Mama Maquín" -an important peasant leader- pushed a soldier who was in her way; others argue that it started because people kept pushing trying to get into the municipality, which was interpreted by the soldiers as an aggression. The mayor at the time, Walter Overdick, said that "people of the middle of the group pushed those who in front." A witness says one protester grabbed the gun from a soldier but did not use it and several people argue that a military voice yelled: One, two, three! Fire!" In fact, the lieutenant who led the troops gave orders to open fire on the crowd.

The shots that rang for about five minutes, were made by regulation firearms carried by the military as well as the three machine guns located on the banks of the square. 36 Several peasants with machetes wounded several soldiers. No soldier was wounded by gunfire. The square was covered with blood.

Immediately, the army closed the main access roads, despite that "indigenous felt terrified." An army helicopter flew over the town before picking up wounded soldiers.

=== Escalation of violence and "scorched earth" ===
After the "execution" of José Luis Arenas population of Hom, Ixtupil, Sajsivan and Sotzil villages, neighbors of La Perla and annexes, increased support for the new guerrilla movement, mainly due to the land dispute that peasants kept with the owners of the farm for several years and that the execution was seen as an act of "social justice".

The murder owner of the farm "La Perla", located in the municipality of Chajul, resulted in the escalation of violence in the area: part of the population moved closer to the guerrillas, while another part of the inhabitants of Hom kept out of the insurgency. In 1979 the owners of the farm "La Perla" established links with the army and for the first time a military detachment was installed within the property; in this same building the first civil patrol of the area was established. The Army high command, meanwhile, was very pleased with the initial results of the operation and was convinced it had succeeded in destroying most of the social basis of EGP, which had to be expelled from the "Ixil Triangle". At this time the presence of EGP in the area decreased significantly due to the repressive actions of the Army, who developed its concept of "enemy" without necessarily including the notion of armed combatants; the officers who executed the plan were instructed to destroy all towns suspect of cooperate with EGP and eliminate all sources of resistance. Army units operating in the "Ixil Triangle" belonged to the Mariscal Zavala Brigade, stationed in Guatemala City. Moreover, although the guerrillas did not intervene directly when the army attacked the civilian population allegedly because they lacked supplies and ammunition, it did support some survival strategies. It streamlined, for example, "survival plans" designed to give evacuation instructions in assumption that military incursions took place. Most of the population began to participate in the schemes finding that them represented their only alternative to military repression.

Since late 1981 the Army applied a strategy of "scorched earth" in Quiché, to eliminate the guerrilla social support EGP. In some communities of the region's military forced all residents to leave their homes and concentrate in the county seat under military control. Some families obeyed; others took refuge in the mountains. K'iche's who took refuge in the mountains, were identified by the Army with the guerrillas and underwent a military siege, and continuous attacks that prevented them from getting food, shelter and medical care.

=== La Llorona massacre, El Estor ===
La Llorona, located about 18 kilometers from El Estor, department of Izabal (part of the Northern Transversal Strip), was a small village with no more than twenty houses. Most of the first settlers arrived from the areas of Senahú and Panzós, both in Alta Verapaz. In 1981 the total population was about 130 people, all belonging to q'eqchi' ethnic group. Few people spoke Spanish and most work in their own cornfields, sporadically working for the local landowners. In the vicinity are the villages El Bongo, Socela, Benque, Rio Pita, Santa Maria, Big Plan and New Hope. Conflicts in the area were related to land tenure, highlighting the uncertainty about the boundaries between farms and communities, and the lack of titles. As in the National Institute of Agrarian Transformation (INTA) was not registered a legitimate owner of land occupied La Llorona, the community remained in the belief that the land belonged to the state, which had taken steps to obtain title property. However, a farmer with great influence in the area occupied part of the land, generating a conflict between him and the community; men of the village, on its own initiative, devised a new boundary between community land and the farmer, but the problem remained dormant.

In the second half of the seventies were the first news about the presence of guerrillas in the villages, the commander aparacimiento Ramon, talking to people and saying they were the Guerrilla Army of the Poor. They passed many villages asking what problems people had and offering to solve them. The told peasants that the land belonged to the poor and that they should trust them. In 1977, Ramon - a guerrilla commander - regularly visited the village of La Llorona and after finding that the issue of land was causing many problems in the community, taught people to practice new measurements, which spread fear among landowners. That same year, the group under Ramon arbitrarily executed the Spanish landowner José Hernández, near El Recreo, which he owner. Following this, a clandestine group of mercenaries, dubbed "fighters of the rich" was formed to protect the interests of landlords; public authority of El Estor organized the group and paid its members, stemming from the funding of major landowners. The group, irregular, was related to the military commissioners of the region and with commanders of the Army, although mutual rivalries also took place. The secret organization murdered several people, including victims who had no connection whatsoever with insurgent groups.

In December 1978, the EGP group leader, Ramon, was captured by soldiers of the military detachment in El Estor and transferred to the military zone of Puerto Barrios; after two years returned to El Estor; but this time as an officer in the Army G2 and joined a group of soldiers that came to the village. On the evening of 28 September 1981, an army officer accompanied by four soldiers and a military commissioner met with about thirty civilians. At seven o'clock, over thirty civilians, mostly from "Nueva Esperanza', including several 'informants' known to military intelligence, gathered around La Llorona along with some military commissioners and a small group of soldiers and army officers. Then they entered the village. Civilians and commissioners entered twelve houses, and each of them were pulling men and shot them dead outside their own homes; those who tried to escape were also killed. Women who tried to protect their husbands were beatn. While the military commissioners and civilians executed men, soldiers subtracted belongings of the victims; within half an hour, the authors of the assault left the village. The victim bodies, fourteen in all, were in front of houses. Women, despite having been threatened with death if tell what happened, ran to the nearest village, El Bongo, for help. After a few hours, women came back with people who helped to bury the bodies. Days later, widows, with almost 60 fatherless children were welcomed by the parish of El Estor for several days, until the soldiers forced them to return to their village. Two widows of those executed on September 29 established close relations with the military commissioners from Bongo. This situation led to divisions that still exist in the community.

The economic and social activity was disrupted in the village: widows had to take the jobs of their husbands; because of their lack of knowledge in the cultivation of land, harvested very little corn and beans. There were diseases, especially among children and the elderly, there was no food or clothing. The teacher of the village came only part-time, mostly out of fear, but left after he realized it was not worth to stay because young people had to work. Nor could they spend money on travel. The village had no teacher for the next four years. The events generated finally the breakup of the community. Some village women though that their husbands were killed because of three others who were linked with the guerrillas and were involved in a land dispute.

According to the Historical Clarification Commission, the landlord with whom the villagers had the land dispute took advantage of the situation to appropriate another twelve acres of land.

=== 1982 coup d'état ===
After the overthrow of Lucas Garcia March 23, 1982, rose to power a military triumvirate headed by General Efrain Rios Montt, along with Horacio Maldonado Shaad colonels and Francisco Gordillo. By 1983, it was estimated that 60% of the territory of Alta Verapaz was owned by military: including presidents Kjell Eugenio Laugerud, Fernando Romeo Lucas García .

=== Other massacres perpetrated by the Army ===
The report of the Recovery of Historical Memory lists 422 massacres committed by both sides in the conflict; however, it also states that they did the best they could in terms of obtaining information and therefore the list is incomplete; therefore here are the cases that have also been documented in other reports as well.

Chajul, Nebaj and Ixcán massacres during Guatemala Civil War
#	Location	Department	Date	Description
1	Ilom (village), Chajul	Quiché	23 March 1982	After 1981 repression against Ilom was rampant, ending with the massacre of 96 alleged guerrilla members in front of their families on 23 March 1982, as part of Army "Victoria 82" plan. Soldiers were from the military base in "La Perla" while survivors fled and seek shelter in Comunidades de Población en Resistencia -Resistance population communities-.
2	Chel (village), Chajul	Quiché	3 April 1982	A part of operation "Victoria 82", Army soldiers from the military fort in "La Perla" rushed into Chel settlement, because it had been targeted as "subversive". The attack left 95 dead civilians.
3	Chisis (village), San Juan Cotzal	Quiché	13 February 1982	Chisís was a military target for the Army, who considered the village symbolic for the EGP and believed it was the guerrilla headquarters where the attacks in Chajul, Cotzal, and Nebaj had been planned. In January 1982, EGP attacked Cotzal military base; the attack lasted 2 hours and 20 minutes, resulting 100 military casualties and 20 for the guerrilla. PAC and Army battalions, in revenge, completely destroy Chisis, leaving approximately 200 dead civilians behind.
4	Acul (village), Nebaj	Quiché	April 1982	Combat against EGP. There were 17 deaths.

=== List of massacres perpetrated by the EGP ===
According to a report by the rightist magazine "Crónica", there were 1258 guerrilla actions against civilians and infrastructure in Guatemala, including more than two hundred murders, sixty eight kidnappings, eleven bombs against embassies and three hundred twenty-nine attacks against civilians. Almost all guerrilla massacres occurred in 1982 when further militarization reigned and there was widespread presence of PAC in communities; many of them were victims of non-cooperation with the guerrillas and in some cases they came after a previous attack by the PAC. In the massacres perpetrated by the guerrillas there is no use of informants, or concentration of population, or separation of groups; also, there are no recounts of rape or repetitive slaughter. There are cases of razed villages and less tendency to mass flight, even though it occurred in some cases, the use of lists was also more frequent.

In a publication of the Army of Guatemala, sixty massacres perpetrated by the EGP were reported, arguing that they were mostly ignored by REHMI and the Historical Clarification Commission reports. It is also reported that in mid-1982, 32 members of "Star Guerrilla Front " were shot for not raising the EGP flag.

Chajul, Nebaj and Ixcán massacres during Guatemala Civil War
#	Location	Department	Date	Description
1	Calapté, Uspantán	Quiché	17 February 1982	There were 42 fatal victims, who were murdered with machetes.
2	Salacuín	Alta Verapaz	May 1982	EGP entered the community and murdered 20 peasants.
3	El Conguito (settlement), Las Pacayas (village), San Cristóbal Verapaz	Alta Verapaz	1981	
4	Sanimtakaj (village), San Cristóbal Verapaz	Alta Verapaz	1980	
5	San Miguel Sechochoch (farm), Chisec	Alta Verapaz	March 1982	
6	Chacalté, Chajul	Quiché	June 1982	Attack against a "reactionary gang" (Note: Comisión para el Esclarecimiento Histórico: Caso No. 110 (1999). "Memoria del silencio" (PDF). Archived (PDF) from the original on 23 March 2017. "EGP classified the PAC according to the collaboration level they gave to the Army. The guerrilla differentiated patrols formed by people eager to help the Army -and called them "reactionary gangs"- from those "forced civilian patrols" that were forcibly participating.") from the PAC in Chacalté, that had just formed in March and was loyal to the Army after becoming disillusioned with guerrilla promises. Resulted in 55 dead civilians.
7	San Miguel Acatán (town), San Miguel Acatán	Huehuetenango	Unknown	
8	Santa Cruz del Quiche (city), Santa Cruz del Quiché	Quiché	July 1982	
9	Chuacaman (settlement), El Carmen Chitatul (village), Santa Cruz del Quiché	Quiché	December 1982	
10	La Estancia(village), Santa Cruz del Quiché	Quiché	August 1981	
11	Xesic (village), Santa Cruz del Quiché	Quiché	1981	
12	Patzité (town)	Quiché	September 1981	
13	Lancetillo (village), Uspantán	Quiché	September 1982	
14	La Taña (village), Uspantán	Quiché	March 1982	
15	Tzununul (village), Sacapulas	Quiché	February 1982	
16	Salinas Magdalena (village), Sacapulas	Quiché	August 1982	
17	Rosario Monte María (village), Chicamán	Quiché	October 1982	

== 21st century ==
=== African oil palm ===
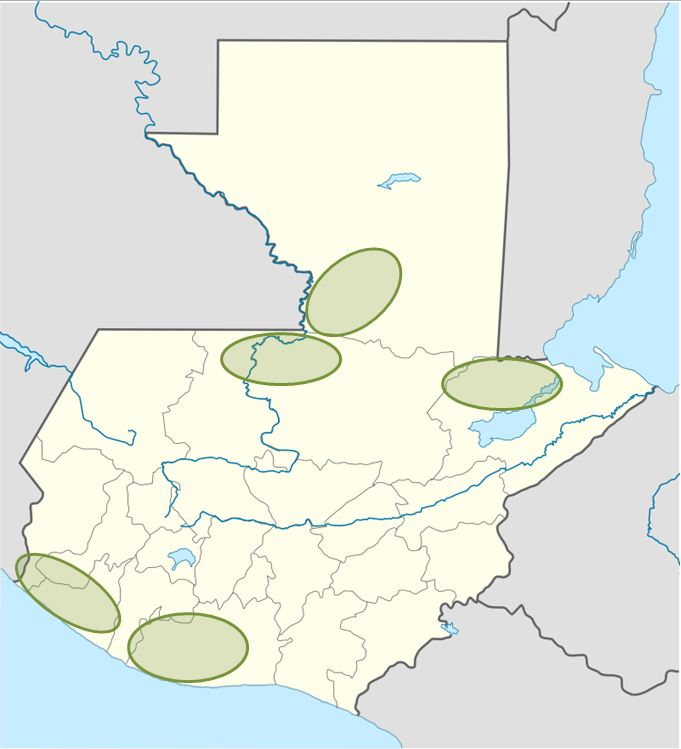
African oil palm plantation areas in Guatemala as of 2014.

There is a large demand within Guatemala and some of its neighbors for edible oils and fats, which would explain how the African oil palm became so prevalent in the country to the detriment of other oils, and which has allowed new companies associated to large capitals in a new investment phase that can be found particularly in some territories that form the Northern Transversal Strip of Guatemala. The investors are trying to turn Guatemala into one of the main palm oil exporters, in spite of a drop in price in international marketd. The most active palm oil regions found in Chisec and Cobán, in Alta Verapaz Department; Ixcán in Quiché Department, and Sayaxché, Petén Department, where Palmas del Ixcán, S.A. (PALIX) is located, both its own plantation and those of its subcontractors. Another active region is that of Fray Bartolomé de las Casas and Chahal in Alta Verapaz Department; El Estor and Livingston, Izabal Department; and San Luis, Petén, where Naturaceites operates.

== See also ==
- Carlos Arana Osorio
- Huehuetenango
- Guatemala Civil War
- El Quiché
- Fernando Romeo Lucas García
- Ixcán
- Izabal

== Notes and references ==
=== Bibliography ===
- Baily, John (1850). Central America; Describing Each of the States of Guatemala, Honduras, Salvador, Nicaragua, and Costa Rica. London: Trelawney Saunders. p. 87.
- Castellanos Cambranes, Julio (1992). Tendencias del desarrollo agrario, en 500 años de lucha por la tierra (in Spanish). Vol. 1. Guatemala: FLACSO.
- Corte internacional de La Haya (1955). "Nottebohm case (second phase). Judgement of April 6th, 1955" (PDF). I.C.J. Reports (in English and French): 4. Archived from the original (PDF) on 2012-02-10.
- Chapman, Peter (2007). Bananas: How the United Fruit Company Shaped the World. Canongate Books Ltd. ISBN 978-1-84195-881-1.
- Collectif (2011). "Perenco: explotar petróleo cueste lo que cueste" (PDF). Une seule planète (in Spanish). Guatemala. Archived from the original (PDF) on 2015-02-18.
- Comisión para el Esclarecimiento Histórico: Agudización (1999). "Agudización de la Violencia y Militarización del Estado (1979–1985)". Guatemala: Memoria del Silencio (in Spanish). Archived from the original (online edition) on 6 May 2013.
- — (1999). "Patrullas de Autodefensa civil". Guatemala: Memoria del Silencio (in Spanish). Archived from the original (online edition) on 6 May 2013.
- — (1999). "Caso ilustrativo No. 13". Guatemala: Memoria del Silencio (in Spanish). Archived from the original (online edition) on 6 May 2013.
- — (1999). "Caso ilustrativo No. 77". Guatemala: Memoria del Silencio (in Spanish). Archived from the original (online edition) on 6 May 2013.
- — (1999). "Caso ilustrativo No. 107". Guatemala: Memoria del Silencio (in Spanish). Archived from the original (online edition) on 6 May 2013.
- — (1999). "Caso ilustrativo No. 110". Guatemala: Memoria del Silencio (in Spanish). Archived from the original (online edition) on 6 May 2013.
- Compagnie Belge de Colonisation (1844). "Colonisation du district de Santo-Thomas de Guatemala par la Communauté de l'Union". Collection de Renseignements Publiés Ou Recueillis Par la Compagnie (in French).
- De los Ríos, Efraín (1948). Ombres contra Hombres (in Spanish). México: Fondo de la Cultura de la Universidad de México.
- García Arriaga, Marlon (2011). Panzós, 33 años después (1978–2011) (PDF) (in Spanish). Guatemala: FLACSO; Rights action. Archived from the original (PDF) on 2014-05-27.
- Guerrero, Gonzalo (1995). "Masacre en Chisec; la sangre se repite". Revista Envío (in Spanish) (165).
- Informe REHMI (n.d.). "Recuperación de la Memoria Histórica: Tomo II. Los Mecanismos de la violencia". Derechos Humanos Website (in Spanish). Archived from the original on 15 June 2012.
- Justice Republic (11 May 2013). "Entrevista completa Ríos Montt: Yo controlo al ejército". YouTube (in Spanish).
- Martínez Peláez, Severo (1988). Racismo y análisis histórico de la definición del Indio Guatemalteco. Guatemala: Universitaria.
- Solano, Luis (2012). Contextualización histórica de la Franja Transversal del Norte (FTN) (PDF) (in Spanish). Centro de Estudios y Documentación de la Frontera Occidental de Guatemala, CEDFOG. Archived from the original (PDF) on 13 November 2014.
- Solano, Luis (15 July 2015). "Palma Africana" (PDF). Revista Enfoque (in Spanish) (36). Archived from the original (PDF) on 20 July 2015.
- Maudslay, Alfred Percival; Maudslay, Anne Cary (1899). A glimpse at Guatemala, and some notes on the ancient mmonuments of Central America. Londres: John Murray.
- Sabino, Carlos (2008). Guatemala, la historia silenciada (1944–1989). Tomo II: El dominó que no cayó. México: Fondo de cultura Económica.
- Woodward, Ralph Lee (1993). Rafael Carrera and the Emergence of the Republic of Guatemala, 1821–1871. Athens, GA: University of Georgia Press. ISBN 978-0820314488.
