= El Estor =

- Municipality and town

- Location in Guatemala
- Coordinates: 15°32′0″N 89°21′0″W
- Country: Guatemala
- Department: Izabal Department

Government
  - Mayor (2016-2020): Rony Méndez (UNE)

Area
  - Total: 495 sq mi (1,283 km^{2})

Population (2018 census)
  - Total: 73,328
  - Density: 148.0/sq mi (57.15/km^{2})
- Climate: Af

El Estor is a town and a municipality in the Izabal department of Guatemala. As of the 2018 census, the town's population was 20,489. The population of El Estor consists largely of Qʼeqchiʼ speaking indigenous people .

== History ==
Before roads and railroads, Lake Izabal was the link between Alta Verapaz and the rest of the world. What is now known as "El Estor" was the landing and trading post for cargo and travelers to frontier towns such as Cobán. Commonly referred to as "the store" in English by British merchants Skinner & Kleé, the name evolved most likely to its present form due to Spanish-speakers style of pronunciation and spelling.

El Estor was established as a settlement on 29 October 1886, given the remote location it was, relative to Livingston, Izabal; president Manuel Lisandro Barillas also appointed a commissioner and a Judge of Peace for the region, with a monthly salary of 40 pesos. A few years later, it was elevated to municipality because the distance issue had not been resolved, on 5 November 1890.

On 20 January 1940, El Estor was annexed to Alta Verapaz Department by then president Jorge Ubico a change that was reverted once Ubico was deposed in 1944. An executive action by President Juan José Arévalo on 5 June 1945 incorporated El Estor to Izabal once again.

=== Franja Transversal del Norte ===
In the 1960s, the importance of the region known as Franja Transversal del Norte was in livestock, exploitation of precious export wood and archaeological wealth. Timber contracts we granted to multinational companies such as Murphy Pacific Corporation from California, which invested US$30 million for the colonization of southern Petén and Alta Verapaz, and formed the North Impulsadora Company. Colonization of the area was made through a process by which inhospitable areas of the Franja Transversal del Norte (FTN) were granted to native peasants.

In 1964, the National Institute for Agrarian Transformation (INTA) defined the geography of the FTN as the northern part of the departments of Huehuetenango, Quiché, Alta Verapaz and Izabal and that same year priests of the Maryknoll order and the Order of the Sacred Heart began the first process of colonization, along with INTA, carrying settlers from Huehuetenango to the Ixcán sector in Quiché.

The Northern Transversal Strip was officially created during the government of General Carlos Arana Osorio in 1970, by Decree 60-70 in the Congress, for agricultural development. The area included within the municipalities: San Ana Huista, San Antonio Huista, Nentón, Jacaltenango, San Mateo Ixtatán, and Santa Cruz Barillas in Huehuetenango; Chajul and San Miguel Uspantán in Quiché; Cobán, Chisec, San Pedro Carchá, Lanquín, Senahú, Cahabón and Chahal, in Alta Verapaz and the entire department of Izabal.

=== EXMIBAL ===
During the government of Julio César Méndez Montenegro the possibility of giving the nickel mines in Izabal in concession to a Canadian mining company was brought to the table, but it did not materialized. As soon as the general Carlos Arana Osorio took office on 1 July 1970, he reopened the case and began working in for EXMIBAL to get a concession; however, many social sectors opposed to it, arguing that it would be too costly for the country. One of the main opponents was the Commission that the University of San Carlos created to discuss the matter; among the members of the commission was the lawyer Oscar Adolfo Mijangos López, then representative in the Congress, the respected Guatemalan intellectual Alfonso Bauer Paiz -who had been part of the staff of presidents Juan José Arévalo and Jacobo Árbenz, and Julio Carney Herrera Both Camey Herrera and Bauer Paiz were shot in November 1970: Carney died of his wounds while Bauer Paz, severely wounded, had to go into exile.

The commission members had strongly opposed the conditions proposed by the Government to grant the concession EXMIBAL; after the attack against Bauer Paiz and Carney, on 13 February 1971 Mijangos López was assassinated by unknown assailants as he left his office long the 4th Avenue in Zone 1 of the Guatemala City. Mijangos Lopez had been under the fatal impression that the government was not going to assassinate him because he was on a wheelchair since 1958.

On 8 May 1971, Arana Osorio's administration finally granted the concession to EXMIBAL; it covered 385 square kilometers in the area of El Estor, with and initial investment of US$228 million. The mine, built in the mountains of indigenous maya Q'eqchi people, included a residential complex of 700 homes, numerous offices, a hospital, a small shopping center, school, a golf course and a large area for industrial processing.

=== Panzós massacre ===
Also located in the Northern Transversal Strip, the valley of the Polochic River was inhabited since ancient times by k'ekchí and P'okomchi people. In the second half of the nineteenth century, President Justo Rufino Barrios (1835-1885) began the allocation of land in the area to German farmers. Decree 170 (or decree of Census Redemption Decree) facilitated the expropriation of Indian land in favor of the Germans, because it promoted the auction of communal lands. Since that time, the main economic activity was export-oriented, especially coffee, bananas and cardamom. The communal property, dedicated to subsistence farming, became private property led to the cultivation and mass marketing of agricultural products. Therefore, the fundamental characteristic of the Guatemalan production system has since that time been the accumulation of property in few hands, and a sort of "farm servitude" based on the exploitation of "farmer settlers". (Note: According to Guatemalan leftists, this is only a euphemism to refer to "native slaves".)

In 1951, the agrarian reform law that expropriated idle land from private hands was enacted, but in 1954, with the National Liberation Movement coup supported by the United States, most of the land that had been expropriated, was awarded back to its former landowners. Flavio Monzón was appointed mayor and in the next twenty years he became one of the largest landowners in the area. In 1964, several communities settled for decades on the shore of Polochic River claimed property titles to INTA which was created in October 1962, but the land was awarded to Flavio Monzón. A Mayan peasant from Panzós later said that Flavio Monzón "got the signatures of the elders before he went before INTA to talk about the land. When he returned, gathered the people and said that, by an INTA mistake, the land had gone to his name." Throughout the 1970s, Panzós farmers continued to claim INTA regularization of land ownership receiving legal advice from the FASGUA (Autonomous Trade Union Federation of Guatemala), an organization that supported the peasants' demands through legal procedures. However, no peasant received a property title, ever. Some obtained promises while other had provisional property titles, and there were also some that only had received permission to plant. The peasants began to suffer evictions from their land by farmers, the military and local authorities in favor of the economic interests of Izabal Mining Operations Company (EXMIBAL) in El Estor and Transmetales. (Note: Another threat at that time for peasant proprietors were mining projects and exploration of oil: Exxon, Shenandoah, Hispanoil and Getty Oil all had exploration contracts; besides there was the need for territorial expansion of two megaprojects of that era: Northern Transversal Strip and Chixoy Hydroelectric Plant.)

In 1978 a military patrol was stationed a few kilometers from the county seat of Panzós, in a place known as "Quinich". At this time organizational capacity of peasant had increased through committees who claimed titles to their land, a phenomenon that worried the landlord sector. Some of these owners -among them Flavio Monzón- stated: "Several peasants living in the villages and settlements want to burn urban populations to gain access to private property", and requested protection from Alta Verapaz governor. (Note: In municipal minutes 34-64 (published 9 January 1965) one can see the first indication of military presence in the region, when it was written that it was imperative to incorporate order and security in the area.)

On 29 May 1978, peasants from Cahaboncito, Semococh, Rubetzul, Canguachá, Sepacay villages, finca Moyagua and neighborhood La Soledad, decided to hold a public demonstration in the Plaza de Panzós to insist on the claim of land and to express their discontent caused by the arbitrary actions of the landowners and the civil and military authorities. Hundreds of men, women, indigenous children went to the square of the municipal seat of Panzós, carrying their tools, machetes and sticks. One of the people who participated in the demonstration states: "The idea was not to fight with anyone, what was required was the clarification of the status of the land. Soldiers came from various places and they had guns."

There are different versions on how the shooting began: some say it began when "Mama Maquín" -an important peasant leader- pushed a soldier who was in her way; others argue that it started because people kept pushing trying to get into the municipality, which was interpreted by the soldiers as an aggression. The mayor at the time, Walter Overdick, said that "people of the middle of the group pushed those who in front." A witness says one protester grabbed the gun from a soldier but did not use it and several people argue that a military voice yelled: One, two, three! Fire!" In fact, the lieutenant who led the troops gave orders to open fire on the crowd.

The shots that rang for about five minutes, were made by regulation firearms carried by the military as well as the three machine guns located on the banks of the square. 36 Several peasants with machetes wounded several soldiers. No soldier was wounded by gunfire. The square was covered with blood.

Immediately, the army closed the main access roads, despite that "indigenous felt terrified." An army helicopter flew over the town before picking up wounded soldiers.

== Economy ==
=== African oil palm ===
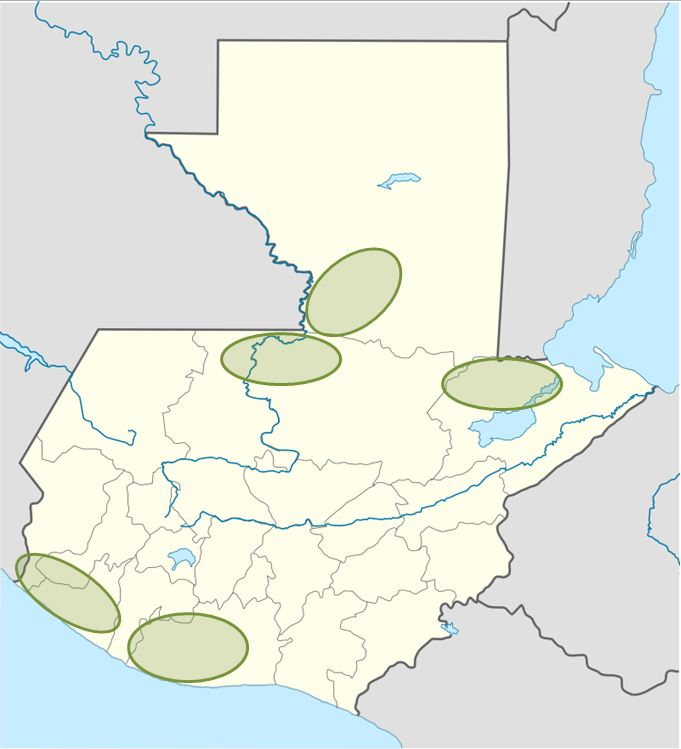
African oil palm plantation areas in Guatemala as of 2014.

There is a large demand within Guatemala and some of its neighbors for edible oils and fats, which would explain how the African oil palm became so prevalent in the country in detriment of other oils, and which has allowed new companies associated to large capitals in a new investment phase that can be found particularly in some territories that form the Northern Transversal Strip of Guatemala. The investors are trying to turn Guatemala into one of the main palm oil exporters, in spite of the decline on its international price. The most active region is found in Chisec and Cobán, in Alta Verapaz Department; Ixcán in Quiché Department, and Sayaxché, Petén Department, where Palmas del Ixcán, S.A. (PALIX) is located, both with its own plantation and those of subcontractors. Another active region is that of Fray Bartolomé de las Casas and Chahal in Alta Verapaz Department; El Estor and Livingston, Izabal Department; and San Luis, Petén, where Naturaceites operates.

== Topography ==
El Estor has more than 150 settlements making it one of the most populated rural municipalities in Guatemala.

Characteristic	List
Mountains	1. Chagüite; 2. Del Mico; 3. De Los Cordón; 4. Sebandera; 5. Del Licenciado; 6. De Los Cabrera; 7. El Imposible
Hills	1. Agua Caliente; 2. El Pataxte; 3. Saconac; 4. Tzambalá; 5. Caná Tomasa; 6. Jolomchacgoú; 7. Selempim Xaan; 8. Caxlampom; 9. Las Minas; 10. Sexán
Mountain chains	1. De Santa Cruz; 2. Sierra de las Minas
Valleys	1. Boca de Río Oscuro; 2. Guanta; 3. Punta Caimán; 4. Punta El Sauce; 5. Secacao; 6. Bocas de Comercio; 7. La Gloria; 8. Punta Chapín; 9. Punta Murciélago; 10. Sechoc; 11. Bocas del Bujajal; 12. Las Palmas; 13. Punta de Chile; 14. Punta Salamacueco; 15. Sepós; 16. Bocas del Cobán; 17. Lagartos; 18. Punta de Frailes; 19. Punta Santa Cruz; 20. Serrum; 21. Cayo de Padre; 22. Malach; 23. Punta del Muerto; 24. Punta Seca; 25. Túníco; 26. Cocodrilo; 27. Manacas; 28. Punta del Sauce; 29. Quebrada de Jutes; 30. Vuelta Veintidós
Rivers	1. Agua Caliente; 2. Colorado; 3. La Balandra; 4. Pencalá; 5. Sepón; 6. Amatillo; 7. Chinabenque; 8. La Catarata; 9. Polochic; 10. Sumache; 11. Benque; 12. China Túnico; 13. La Horqueta; 14. Prieto; 15. Túnico; 16. Blanco; 17. Chinebal; 18. La Lima; 19. Quixchán; 20. Tzambalá; 21. Bongo de Guaritas; 22. Las Cañas; 23. San Antonio; 24. Zarco; 25. Briceño; 26. El Chapín; 27. Las Minas; 28. Santa María; 29. Zarco Grande; 30. Cahabón; 31. El Imposible; 32. Mico Flaco; 33. Sauce; 34. Zarco Norte; 35. Caquijá; 36. El Padre Creek; 37. Oscuro; 38. Semanzana; 39. Zarquito; 40. Caquijá San Antonio; 41. Hondo; 42. Pataxte; 43. Semuc; 44. Zarzaparrilla

== Climate ==
El Estor has a tropical rainforest climate (Köppen climate classification: Af).

Climate data for El Estor
Month	Jan	Feb	Mar	Apr	May	Jun	Jul	Aug	Sep	Oct	Nov	Dec	Year
Mean daily maximum °C (°F)	28.3 (82.9)	29.9 (85.8)	31.6 (88.9)	33.1 (91.6)	33.1 (91.6)	32.9 (91.2)	31.7 (89.1)	32.1 (89.8)	32.2 (90.0)	31.1 (88.0)	29.2 (84.6)	28.4 (83.1)	31.1 (88.1)
Daily mean °C (°F)	24.5 (76.1)	25.2 (77.4)	26.7 (80.1)	27.9 (82.2)	28.4 (83.1)	28.4 (83.1)	27.8 (82.0)	27.8 (82.0)	27.9 (82.2)	27.1 (80.8)	25.5 (77.9)	24.5 (76.1)	26.8 (80.3)
Mean daily minimum °C (°F)	20.7 (69.3)	20.5 (68.9)	21.8 (71.2)	22.8 (73.0)	23.8 (74.8)	24.0 (75.2)	23.9 (75.0)	23.6 (74.5)	23.6 (74.5)	23.1 (73.6)	21.8 (71.2)	20.7 (69.3)	22.5 (72.5)
Average precipitation mm (inches)	138 (5.4)	72 (2.8)	78 (3.1)	71 (2.8)	204 (8.0)	431 (17.0)	502 (19.8)	338 (13.3)	378 (14.9)	266 (10.5)	203 (8.0)	155 (6.1)	2,836 (111.7)
Source: Climate-Data.org

== Geographic location ==
The municipality is situated at the western side of Izabal Department, bordering with Alta Verapaz, El Petén and Zacapa Departments.

== See also ==
- Carlos Manuel Arana Osorio
- Guatemala Civil War
- Izabal Department
- Franja Transversal del Norte

== Notes and references ==
=== Bibliography ===
- Castellanos Cambranes, Julio (1992). Tendencias del desarrollo agrario, en 500 años de lucha por la tierra (in Spanish). Vol. 1. Guatemala: FLACSO.
- Comisión para el Esclarecimiento Histórico: Agudización (1999). "Agudización de la Violencia y Militarización del Estado (1979-1985)". Guatemala: Memoria del Silencio (in Spanish). Programa de Ciencia y Derechos Humanos, Asociación Americana del Avance de la Ciencia. Archived from the original (online edition) on 6 May 2013.
- Diario de Centro América (2 June 1978). "Entrevista a Walter Overdick, alcalde de Panzós". Diario de Centro América, Periódico Oficial de la República de Guatemala (in Spanish).
- Solano, Luis (2012). Contextualización histórica de la Franja Transversal del Norte (FTN) (PDF) (in Spanish). Centro de Estudios y Documentación de la Frontera Occidental de Guatemala, CEDFOG. Archived from the original (PDF) on 13 November 2014.
- Solano, Luis (15 July 2015). "Palma Africana" (PDF). Revista Enfoque (in Spanish) (36). Guatemala. Archived from the original (PDF) on 20 July 2015.
