= Izabal Department =

Department of Guatemala

Izabal Department Departmento de Izabal
- Department of Guatemala
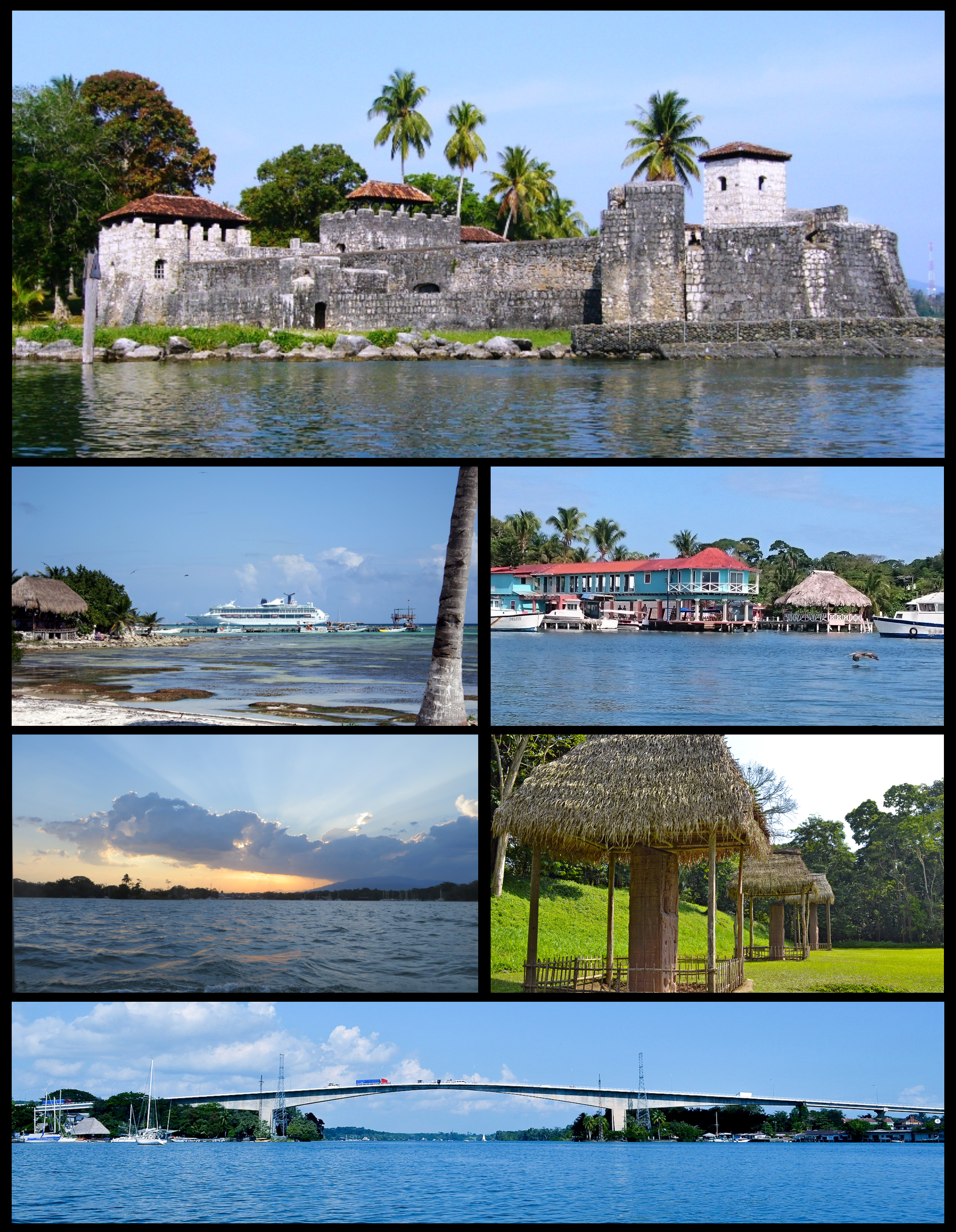
- Counterclockwise from top: San Felipe Castle, cruise ship in the port city of Puerto Barrios, Livingston, Rio Dulce, Quirigua UNESCO World Heritage Site & 830 meter long bridge of Rio Dulce

- Flag Coat of arms

- Izabal Department in Guatemala

- Izabal and its neighbors (Note: In Guatemala, to the north, Petén, to the west, Alta Verapaz, to the south, Zacapa; in Honduras, to the south, Copán, to the southeast, Santa Bárbara, to the east, Cortés department. In the Caribbean Sea, to the northeast, Amatique Bay in the Gulf of Honduras; and in Belize to the north, Toledo.)
- Coordinates: 15°44′0″N 88°36′0″W
- Country: Guatemala
- Capital: Puerto Barrios
- Municipalities: 5

Government
  - Type: Departmental

Area
  - Department of Guatemala: 9,038 km^{2} (3,490 sq mi)
  - Water: 590 km^{2} (230 sq mi)

Population (2018)
  - Department of Guatemala: 408,688
  - Density: 45/km^{2} (120/sq mi)
  - Urban: 167,653
  - Ethnicities: Ladino; Q'eqchi'; Garífuna; Afro-Caribbean
  - Religions: Roman Catholicism; Evangelicalism; Maya
- Time zone: UTC-6
- ISO 3166 code: GT-IZ

Izabal (Spanish pronunciation: [isaˈβal]) is one of the 22 departments of Guatemala. Its coastal areas form part of the homeland of the Garifuna people.

Izabal is bordered to the north by Belize, to the northeast by the Gulf of Honduras, to the east by Honduras, and by the Guatemalan departments of Petén to the northwest, Alta Verapaz to the west, and Zacapa to the south.

The Izabal Department surrounds Lake Izabal (or Lago de Izabal), which is Guatemala's largest lake (about 48 km long and 24 km wide, with an area of about 590 km^{2}). The Spanish Colonial fort of San Felipe, now a Guatemalan national monument, overlooks the point where the lake flows into the Río Dulce.

The small town of Izabal is on the south shore of the lake; before the construction of the ports of Livingston and Puerto Barrios in the 19th century it was Guatemala's primary Caribbean Sea port and was the original seat of the Izabal Department. The town of Izabal has since become a remote village with minimal traffic.

From the area around Lake Izabal, the Department of Izabal stretches along the Río Dulce to the coast of the Caribbean Sea.

The department of Izabal includes the ports of Puerto Barrios (the departmental seat), Santo Tomás de Castilla, Livingston and Guatemala's free trade zone Zolic. Izabal also includes the Pre-Columbian Maya ruins of Quirigua.

== Municipalities ==
1. El Estor
2. Livingston
3. Los Amates
4. Morales
5. Puerto Barrios

== See also ==
- Carlos Manuel Arana Osorio
- EXMIBAL
- Franja Transversal del Norte
- Jacobo Árbenz Guzmán
- José María Orellana
- Puerto Barrios
- Quiriguá
- Rafael Carrera
- Santo Tomás de Castilla
- United Fruit Company
