= Santa Cruz Barillas =

Coordinates: 15.8014°N 91.3125°W

Santa Cruz Barillas Yalmotx
- Municipality
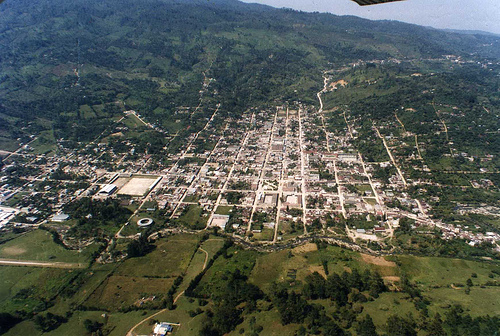

- Location in Guatemala
- Country: Guatemala
- Department: Huehuetenango Department

Area
  - Total: 453 sq mi (1,174 km^{2})

Population (2018 census)
  - Total: 100,849
  - Density: 222.5/sq mi (85.90/km^{2})

Santa Cruz Barillas (also known as Yalmotx in Qʼanjobʼal) is a town, with a population of 17,166 (2018 census), and a municipality in the Guatemalan department of Huehuetenango. It is situated at 1450 metres above sea level. It covers a terrain of 1,174 km^{2}. The annual festival is April 29-May 4.

== Climate ==
Barillas has a tropical rainforest climate (Af) with heavy to very heavy rainfall year-round and extremely heavy rainfall from June to August.

Climate data for Barillas
Month	Jan	Feb	Mar	Apr	May	Jun	Jul	Aug	Sep	Oct	Nov	Dec	Year
Mean daily maximum °C (°F)	25.0 (77.0)	25.7 (78.3)	27.3 (81.1)	28.1 (82.6)	27.4 (81.3)	26.2 (79.2)	25.7 (78.3)	26.0 (78.8)	25.8 (78.4)	24.9 (76.8)	25.1 (77.2)	25.0 (77.0)	26.0 (78.8)
Daily mean °C (°F)	18.4 (65.1)	18.6 (65.5)	19.9 (67.8)	20.9 (69.6)	20.6 (69.1)	20.5 (68.9)	20.0 (68.0)	20.0 (68.0)	20.0 (68.0)	19.4 (66.9)	19.1 (66.4)	18.8 (65.8)	19.7 (67.4)
Mean daily minimum °C (°F)	11.8 (53.2)	11.6 (52.9)	12.6 (54.7)	13.7 (56.7)	13.9 (57.0)	14.8 (58.6)	14.4 (57.9)	14.1 (57.4)	14.3 (57.7)	14.0 (57.2)	13.1 (55.6)	12.6 (54.7)	13.4 (56.1)
Average precipitation mm (inches)	225 (8.9)	150 (5.9)	131 (5.2)	140 (5.5)	233 (9.2)	676 (26.6)	860 (33.9)	649 (25.6)	611 (24.1)	515 (20.3)	331 (13.0)	254 (10.0)	4,775 (188.2)
Source: Climate-Data.org
