= Uspantán =

- Municipality
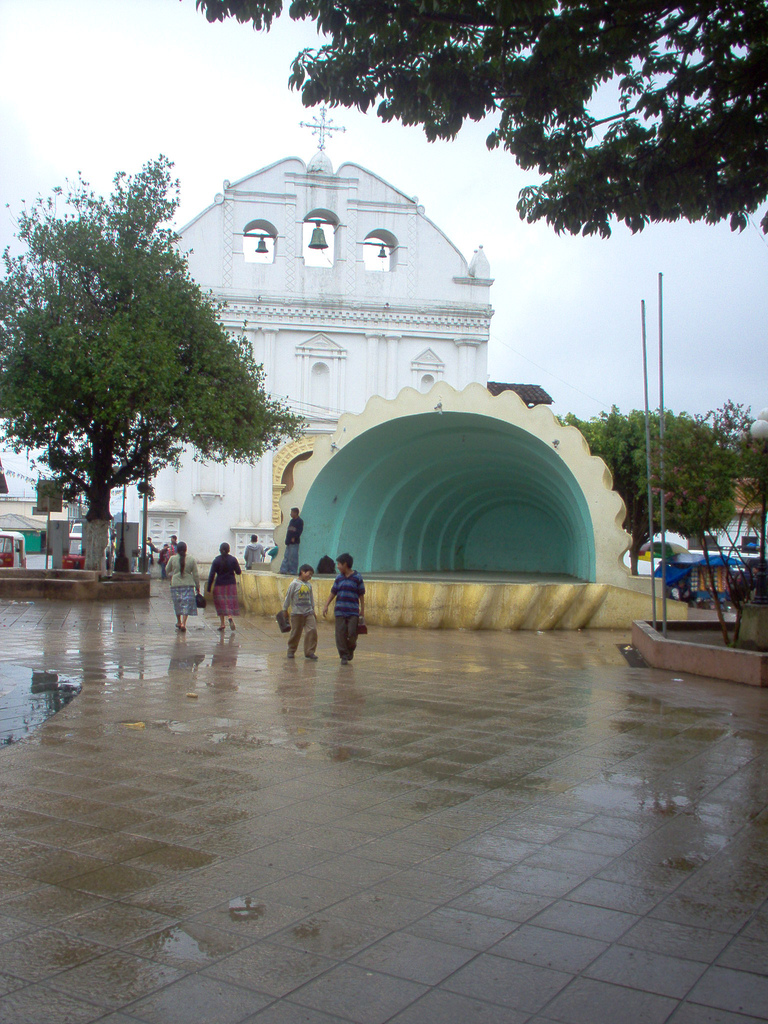
- Amphitheater and Cathedral overlooking parque central after a rain. (2007)

- Location in Guatemala
- Coordinates: 15°20′45″N 90°52′10″W
- Country: Guatemala
- Department: El Quiché
- Municipality: San Miguel Uspantán

Government
  - Type: Municipal
  - Alcalde: Víctor Hugo Figueroa

Area
  - Municipality: 860 km^{2} (330 sq mi)
- Elevation: 1,825 m (5,988 ft)
- Highest elevation: 2,500 m (8,200 ft)
- Lowest elevation: 500 m (1,600 ft)

Population (Census 2018)
  - Municipality: 65,872
  - Density: 77/km^{2} (200/sq mi)
  - Urban: 6,664
  - Ethnicities: Uspantek K'iche' Ixil Q’eqchi’ Ladino
  - Religions: Roman Catholicism Evangelicalism Maya
- Climate: Cwb

Uspantán is a municipality in the Guatemalan department of El Quiché. It is one of the largest municipalities of El Quiché and stretches from the mountainous highlands in the South to the tropical lowlands in the North. The municipal seat is in Villa de San Miguel Uspantán with a population of 2,800. The birthplace of Nobel Peace Prize winner Rigoberta Menchú, a community named Laj Chimel, is located Uspantán not far from the municipal seat. Completion of paving on the road in from Chichicastenango has brought a small tourist boom to the town.

The municipality includes the pre-Columbian Maya archaeological site of Chitinamit, believed to be Jakawitz, the first capital of the K'iche' Maya.
