= Economy of Guatemala =

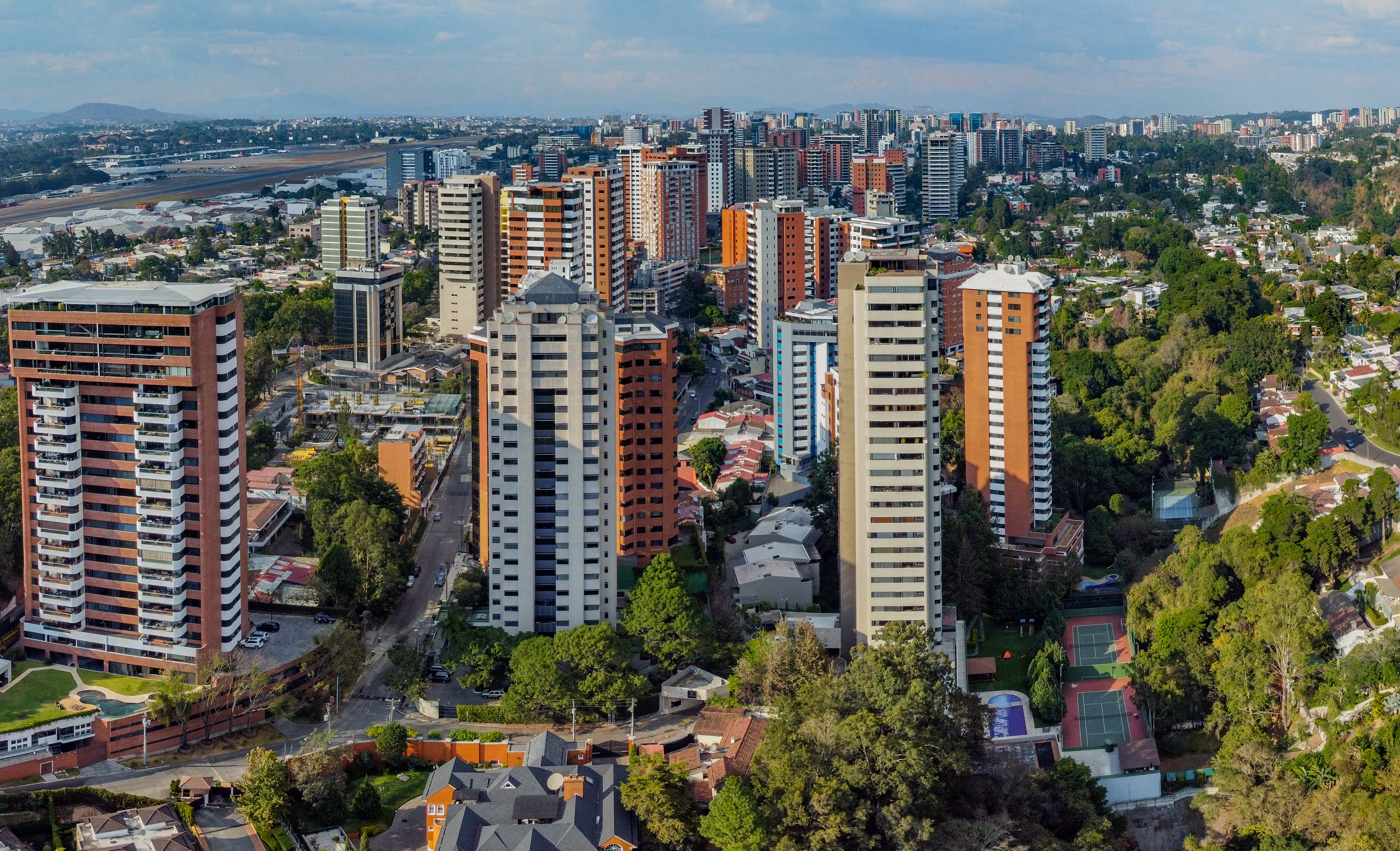
- Guatemala City
- Currency: Quetzal (GTQ)
- Fiscal year: Calendar year
- Country group: Developing/Emerging; Upper-middle income economy

Statistics
- Population: ▲18,863,135 (2023 est.)
- GDP: ▲$128.88 billion (nominal; 2026); ▲$303.02 billion (PPP; 2026)
- GDP rank: 66th (nominal; 2026); 69th (PPP; 2026)
- GDP growth: 3.9% (2026)
- GDP per capita: ▲$6,810 (nominal; 2026); ▲$16,021 (PPP; 2026)
- GDP per capita rank: 107th (nominal; 2026); 109th (PPP; 2026)
- GDP per capita growth: 2.7% (real; 2025)
- GDP by sector: agriculture: 13.3%; industry: 23.4%; services: 63.2%; (2017 est.)
- Inflation (CPI): 4.2% (2020 est.)
- Population below national poverty line: ▼56% in poverty (2023); ▲47% on less than $8.30/day (2023)
- Gini coefficient: ▼45.2 high (2023)
- Human Development Index: ▲0.662 medium (2023) (137th); ▲0.479 low IHDI (114th) (2023)
- Labour force: ▲7,406,030 (2023); ▲39.2% (2023)
- Labour force by occupation: agriculture: 31.4%; industry: 12.8%; services: 55.8%; (2017 est.)
- Unemployment: ▼2.5% (2017); ▼5.0% youth unemployment (2017)
- Main industries: sugar, textiles and clothing, furniture, chemicals, petroleum, metals, rubber, tourism

External
- Exports: ▲$15.43 billion (2024 est.)
- Export goods: Bananas, coffee, raw sugar, knit apparel, spices, palm oil, melons, packaged medicaments, cleaning products, baked goods, pesticides.
- Main export partners: United States 34.08%; El Salvador 10.95%; Honduras 6.45%; Nicaragua 5.1%; Mexico 4.82%; Costa Rica 4.15%; Netherlands 3.29%; Canada 3.12%; Dominican Republic 2.09%; Panama 2.06%; (2024)
- Imports: ▲$32.84 billion (2024 est.)
- Import goods: Fuels, machinery and transport equipment, construction materials, grain, fertilizers, electricity, mineral products, chemical products, plastic materials and products
- Main import partners: United States 29.47%; China 19.45%; Mexico 10.10%; El Salvador 3.77%; Costa Rica 3.03%; Japan 2.70%; Brazil 2.33%; India 2.28%; Honduras 2.14%; Colombia 1.88%; (2024)
- Current account: ▲$1.134 billion (2017 est.)
- Gross external debt: ▲$22.92 billion (31 December 2017 est.)

Public finance
- Government debt: ▲24.7% of GDP (2017 est.)
- Foreign reserves: ▲$11.77 billion (31 December 2017 est.)
- Budget balance: −1.3% (of GDP) (2017 est.)
- Revenue: 8.164 billion (2017 est.)
- Spending: 9.156 billion (2017 est.)
- Economic aid: $250 million (2000 est.)
- Credit rating: Standard & Poor's: BB+ (Domestic); BB (Foreign); BBB- (T&C Assessment); Outlook: Stable; Moody's: Ba1; Outlook: Stable; Fitch: BB+; Outlook: Stable
- All values, unless otherwise stated, are in US dollars.

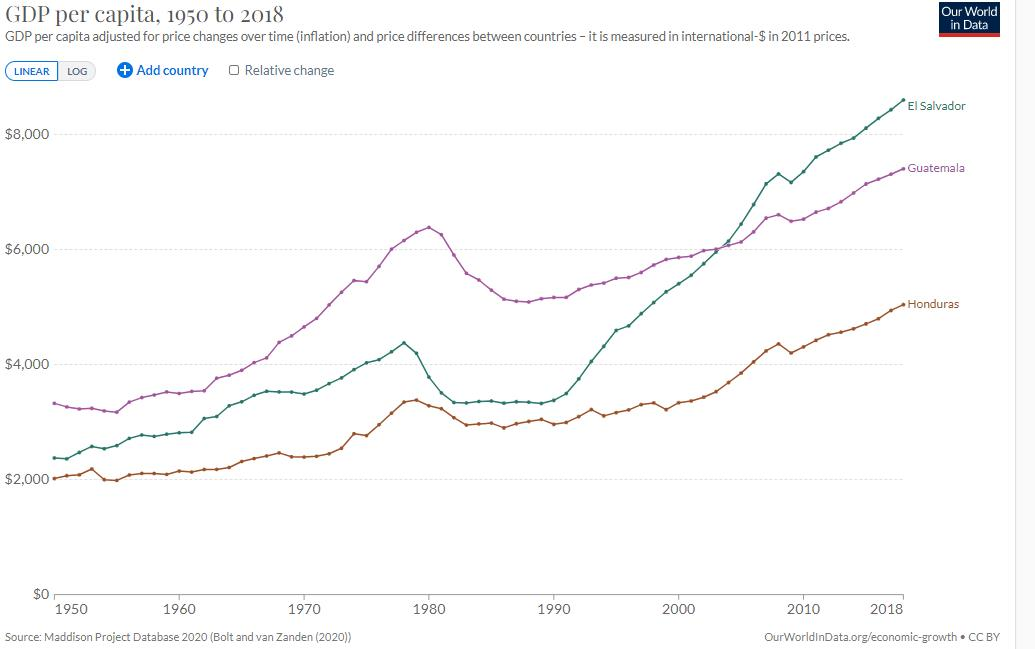
Historical GDP per capita development of El Salvador, Guatemala and Honduras

The economy of Guatemala is considered a developing economy, highly dependent on agriculture, particularly on traditional crops such as coffee, sugar, and bananas. The Guatemalan economy is the largest in Central America. It grew 3.3 percent on average from 2015 to 2018. However, Guatemala remains one of the poorest countries in Latin America and the Caribbean, having highly unequal incomes and chronically malnourished children. The country is beset by political insecurity, and lacks skilled workers and infrastructure. It depends on remittances for nearly one-tenth of the GDP.

The 1996 peace accords ended the 36-years-long Guatemalan Civil War, and removed a major obstacle to foreign investment. Since then Guatemala has pursued important reforms and macroeconomic stabilization. On 1 July 2006, the Central American Free Trade Agreement (CAFTA) entered into force between the United States and Guatemala. It has since spurred increased investment in the export sector. The distribution of income remains highly unequal, with 12% of the population living below the international poverty line. Guatemala's large expatriate community in the United States, has made it the top remittance recipient in Central America. These inflows are a primary source of foreign income, equivalent to nearly two-thirds of exports.

Guatemala's gross domestic product for 1990 was estimated at $19.1 billion, with real growth slowing to approximately 3.3%. Ten years later, in 2000, it rose from 1 to 4% and by 2010 it had fallen back to 3%, according to the World Bank. The final peace accord in December 1996 left Guatemala well-positioned for rapid economic growth.

Guatemala's economy is dominated by the private sector, which generates about 85% of GDP. Most of its manufacturing is light assembly and food processing, geared to the domestic, U.S., and Central American markets. In 1990 the labor force participation rate for women was 42%, later increasing by 1% in 2000 to 43% and 51% in 2010. For men, the labor force participation rate in 1990 was about 89%, decreased to 88% in 2000, and increased up to 90% in 2010 (World Bank). Self-employment for men is about 50%, while the rate for women is about 32% (Pagàn 1).

Over the past several years, tourism and exports of textiles, apparel, and nontraditional agricultural products such as winter vegetables, fruit, and cut flowers have boomed, while more traditional exports such as sugar, bananas, and coffee continue to represent a large share of the export market.Over the past twenty years the percentage of exports of goods and services has fluctuated. In 1990 it was 21% and in 2000, 20%. It increased again in 2010 to 26%. On the other hand, its level of imports of goods and services has continually increased. In 1990 its imports of goods and services was about 25%. In 2000 it increased by 4% up to 29%, and in 2010 it increased up to 36%. Migration is another important avenue in Guatemala. According to Cecilia Menjivar, remittances are "central to the economy." In 2004 remittances to Guatemala from men's migration to the U.S. accounted for approximately 97% (Menjivar 2)......

The United States is the country's largest trading partner, providing 30% of Guatemala's imports and receiving 33% of its exports. The government sector is small and shrinking, with its business activities limited to public utilities—some of which have been privatized—ports and airports and several development-oriented financial institutions. Guatemala was certified to receive export trade benefits under the United States' Caribbean Basin Trade and Partnership Act (CBTPA) in October 2000, and enjoys access to U.S. Generalized System of Preferences (GSP) benefits. Due to concerns over serious worker rights protection issues, however, Guatemala's benefits under both the CBTPA and GSP are currently under review.

The country is predominantly poor, with 49 percent of the population living in rural areas. Guatemala is characterized by a markedly unequal distribution of wealth, assets, and opportunities: between 2000 and 2014, rural poverty increased from 74.5 to 76.1 percent, while extreme rural poverty increased from 23.8 to 35.3 percent. Young people and indigenous communities are the most vulnerable. Among indigenous people, who comprise almost 40 percent of the total population, the poverty rate is approximately 80 percent.

The Inequality-adjusted HDI (IHDI) index for Guatemala is 0.481 (Data from 2019), below the average for Latin America (0.596) and distant from the countries with very high human development (0.800).

== Economic history ==
Historically, the Guatemala economy was heavily dependent on agriculture. Following independence, the late 19th-century governments focused on infrastructure and export-led growth, heavily promoting coffee production. This resulted in large-scale land privatization and the dispossession of communal indigenous land. In 1930, coffee was 77% of exports and bananas were 13%.

In the early 1900s, the United Fruit Company (UFCO) gained immense economic and political control. The country became the archetype of a "Banana republic," whereby foreign multinational corporations controlled vast lands, railroads and the bulk of agricultural exports. The presidencies of Juan José Arévalo and Jacobo Árbenz sought to modernize the economy by implementing land redistribution. Árbenz's Decree 900 redistributed uncultivated UFCO lands, challenging foreign corporate interests and resulting in a coup in 1954 that abruptly ended the reforms.

The Guatemalan Civil War severely crippled infrastructure, damaged investor confidence and stifled economic growth. The economy relied entirely on a narrow range of traditional exports (coffee, sugar, bananas), making the country highly vulnerable to global commodity price shocks. Following the Guatemalan Peace Process (1994–1996), Guatemala sought to stabilize its economy by joining the Dominican Republic–Central America Free Trade Agreement (CAFTA-DR) in 2006, boosting its export and manufacturing sectors.

In 2019, Honduras signed the Central America–United Kingdom Association Agreement with the United Kingdom.

== Economic sectors ==
=== Agriculture ===
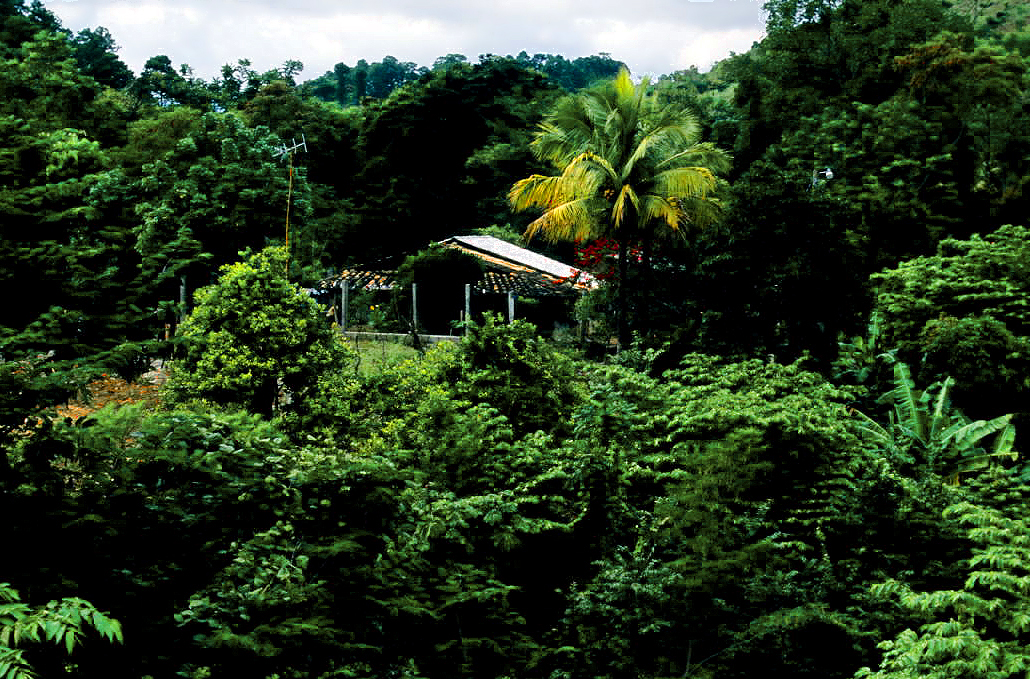
Rural house in Chiquimula

Guatemala is the world leader in cardamom production and export. As of 2013, demand for biofuels has resulted in diversion of land from subsistence agriculture to sugar cane and African Palm plantations. Much of the land is owned by large landlords. Due to legal requirements for production of biofuels in the United States the price of maize, a Guatemalan staple, has risen sharply. Agriculture accounts for 60% of Guatemalan exports and employs more than 50% of the labor force.

In 2018, Guatemala produced 35.5 million tons of sugarcane (it's one of the 10 largest producers in the world) and 4 million tons of banana (it's one of the 15 largest world producers). In addition, in the same year it produced 2.3 million tons of palm oil, 245 thousand tons of coffee, 1.9 million tons of maize, 623 thousand tons of melon, 312 thousand tons of pineapple, 564 thousand tons of potato, 349 thousand tons of rubber, 331 thousand tons of tomato, 253 thousand tons of beans, 124 thousand tons of avocado, 124 thousand tons of lemon, 177 thousand tons of orange, 120 thousand tons of cauliflower and broccoli, 93 thousand tons of papaya, 107 thousand tons of watermelon, 98 thousand tons of carrot, 75 thousand tons of cabbage, 84 thousand tons of lettuce and chicory, 38 thousand tons of cardamom in addition to smaller productions of other agricultural products.

==== Scale ====
The agricultural sector of Guatemala's economy consists of two types of producers: numerous small-scale peasant-owned farms in the highlands, and fewer medium- to large-scale operations in the more fertile lowlands. The smaller farms produce staples for Guatemalan consumption, such as beans and maize, as well as fruits and vegetables for export. Larger farms produce export and plantation products like bananas, sugar cane, coffee, and rubber and palm oil. While 88% of agricultural land in Guatemala is in large-scale farms, 92% of all farms in Guatemala are small. Large farms produce 1/3 more per hectare than small farms, but employ fewer people overall.

==== Non-traditional agricultural exports ====
The shift to the production of non-traditional agricultural exports (NTAE) is a strategy used by developing countries like Guatemala to grow the agricultural sector and decreasing inequality by including the rural poor in the benefits of globalization. The most important NTAE crops in Guatemala include

- fruit like mangos, melons, and berries
- vegetables like cauliflower, cabbage, broccoli, and snow peas
- organic crops such as coffee. The value of non-traditional agricultural export crops has increased from $146 million US in 1992 to $262 million in 2001. IN 1998, NTAE accounted for 8.7 percent of the total exports. NTAE production largely comes from small-scale farmers. While the farmers who are involved in this market are not failing, this market limits their capital accumulation to slow growth, and therefore they are not able to profit highly off of this market.

==== Gender ====
The agricultural sector of Guatemala is differentiated by gender, and this differential can be seen in several different areas within the sector. More men than women inherit or buy land individually, although many houses choose to rent land instead of buying it. Additionally, there is a gender gap in the division of agricultural labor. Traditionally, men dominated subsistence production and agricultural production for domestic markets, while women had roles in small animal production, craft production, and the selling of products in regional rather than national markets. With the shift toward NTAE, there has also been an increase in field labor for women. Additionally, women have been included in land-use decision processes in NTAE production. Sarah Hamilton, Linda Asturias de Barrios, and Brenda Tevalán have stated that despite a traditional patriarchal structure in Guatemala, NTAE production is associated with increased independence and equality between men and women.

==== Climate change ====
Dry Corridor in Guatemala

Guatemalan farmers have experienced extreme weather events such as hurricanes, as well as erratic weather patterns with spikes and drops in temperature, torrential rains, drought, and unexpected frost. One crop affected has been potatoes, which suffer from fungus.

Guatemala's western highlands are particularly susceptible to climate change, impacting the region's predominantly indigenous population of subsistence farmers. The main crops, potatoes and maize, have been over increasing pressure as hard frosts in the region have become more frequent since 2013. Hard frosts can kill a whole season's worth of crops at once. At lower elevations, new pests are becoming more prevalent and there has been decreased rainfall.

The problem of food security and famine has increased, especially in the "corredor seco" (an area extending from the departments of Izabal and Baja Verapaz in the north to Santa Rosa and Jutiapa in the south).

Other crops affected include coffee and cardamom.

In high-altitude areas such as Los Altos de Chiantla in the department of Huehuetenango, located above 3,000 meters, farmers have reported an increase in dangerous frosts (locally known as hieleras), which can damage potato crops. However, these agricultural outcomes have differed in recent years. Some farmers farmers during the 2020s reported stable or "above-average" harvests, which shows how different the impacts are in Guatemala's mountainous terrain.

Disease

Dengue fever has been one of the most widely reported air-borne diseases in Guatemala between 2019 and today. The disease is transmitted by female Aedes mosquitos, which thrive in warm, humid climates. The rising temperatures caused by climate change may expand these habitats into areas otherwise known for their severe lack of mosquitos. Even a slight temperature increase of 1-2 °C may increase the chance of these insects appearing in higher areas. Some studies note that reported dengue incidences has historically been far lower in territories where many Maya communities live due to the cooler temperatures rather than their demographic background.

=== Mining ===
The mineral industry of Guatemala includes:

- The Marlin Mine, a gold mine owned by Montana Exploradora de Guatemala, S.A (Montana), a subsidiary of Canadian company Goldcorp.
- The El Estor mine, one of the largest nickel mines in Guatemala. The mine is located in El Estor in Izabal Department. The mine has reserves amounting to 50 million tonnes of ore grading 1.5% nickel.
- The Fenix nickel project is a nickel resource in Guatemala which was sold by Hudbay in 2011 for $170 million to the Russian owned Solway Group, headquartered in Cyprus. The operation had been on care and maintenance since 1980. It includes a brownfield nickel laterite mine and a process plant. The mine is located in El Estor in Izabal Department. The mine has reserves amounting to 36.1 million tonnes of ore grading 1.86% nickel.
- The Uspantán mine is one of the largest nickel mines in Guatemala. The mine is located in Uspantán in Quiché Department. The mine has reserves amounting to 40 million tonnes of ore grading 1.25% nickel.
- The Escobal mine is a large silver mine located east of San Rafael Las Flores in the south of Guatemala in Jalapa Department. Escobal represents one of the largest silver reserve in Guatemala and in the world having estimated reserves of 367.5 million oz of silver.
- The Canibal mine is a titanium mine in Guatemala. The mine is located in Cuilco in Huehuetenango Department. The mine has reserves amounting to 50 million tonnes of ore grading 19.43% titanium.

=== Education ===
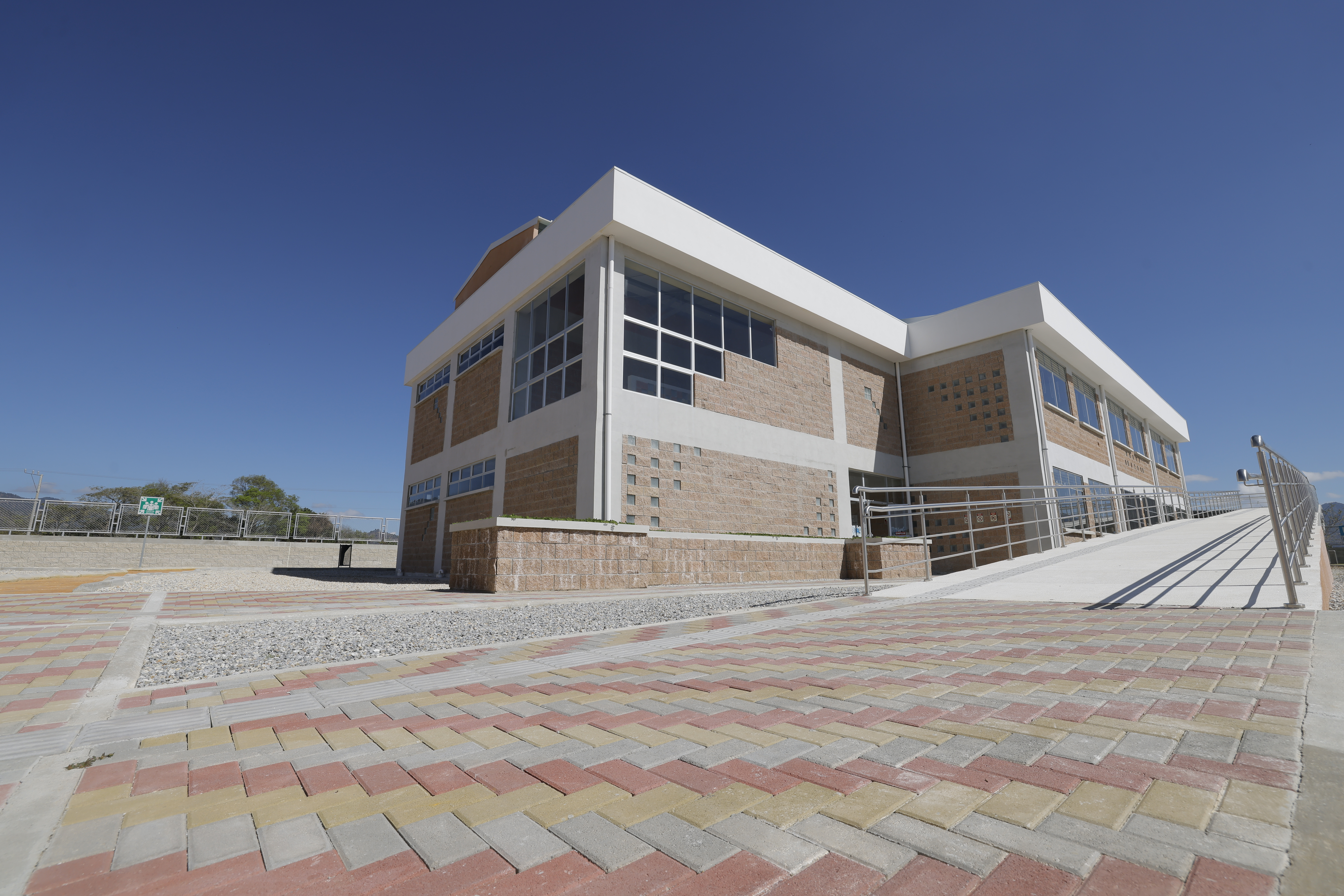
School building in San Pedro Pinula, Jalapa.

Education in Guatemala is under the jurisdiction of the Ministry of Education which oversees formulating, implementing and supervising the national educational policy. According to the Constitution of Guatemala, education is compulsory and free in public schools for the initial, primary and secondary levels. There is a five-tier system of education starting with primary school, followed by secondary school and tertiary education, depending on the level of technical training.

The official language of instruction is Spanish as mandated by the Education Law in 1965 when Spanish became the official language of Guatemala. However, Article 76 of the Constitution mandates bilingual education for regions with a predominantly indigenous population.

The Human Rights Measurement Initiative (HRMI) finds that Guatemala is fulfilling only 60.5% of what it should be fulfilling for the right to education based on the country's level of income. HRMI breaks down the right to education by looking at the rights to both primary education and secondary education. While taking into consideration Guatemala's income level, the nation is achieving 74.9% of what should be possible based on its resources (income) for primary education but only 46.2% for secondary education. 83.3% of the population age 15 and over is literate.

=== Healthcare ===
Health in Guatemala is focused on many different systems of prevention and care. Guatemala's Constitution states that every citizen has the universal right to health care. However, this right has been hard to guarantee due to limited government resources and other problems regarding access. The health care system in place today developed out of the Civil War in Guatemala. The Civil War prevented social reforms from occurring, especially in the sector of health care.

The Human Rights Measurement Initiative finds that Guatemala is fulfilling 81.6% of what it should be fulfilling for the right to health based on its level of income. When looking at the right to health with respect to children, Guatemala achieves 94.8% of what is expected based on its current income. In regards to the right to health amongst the adult population, the country achieves only 87.3% of what is expected based on the nation's level of income. Guatemala falls into the "very bad" category when evaluating the right to reproductive health because the nation is fulfilling only 62.9% of what the nation is expected to achieve based on the resources (income) it has available.

=== Tourism ===
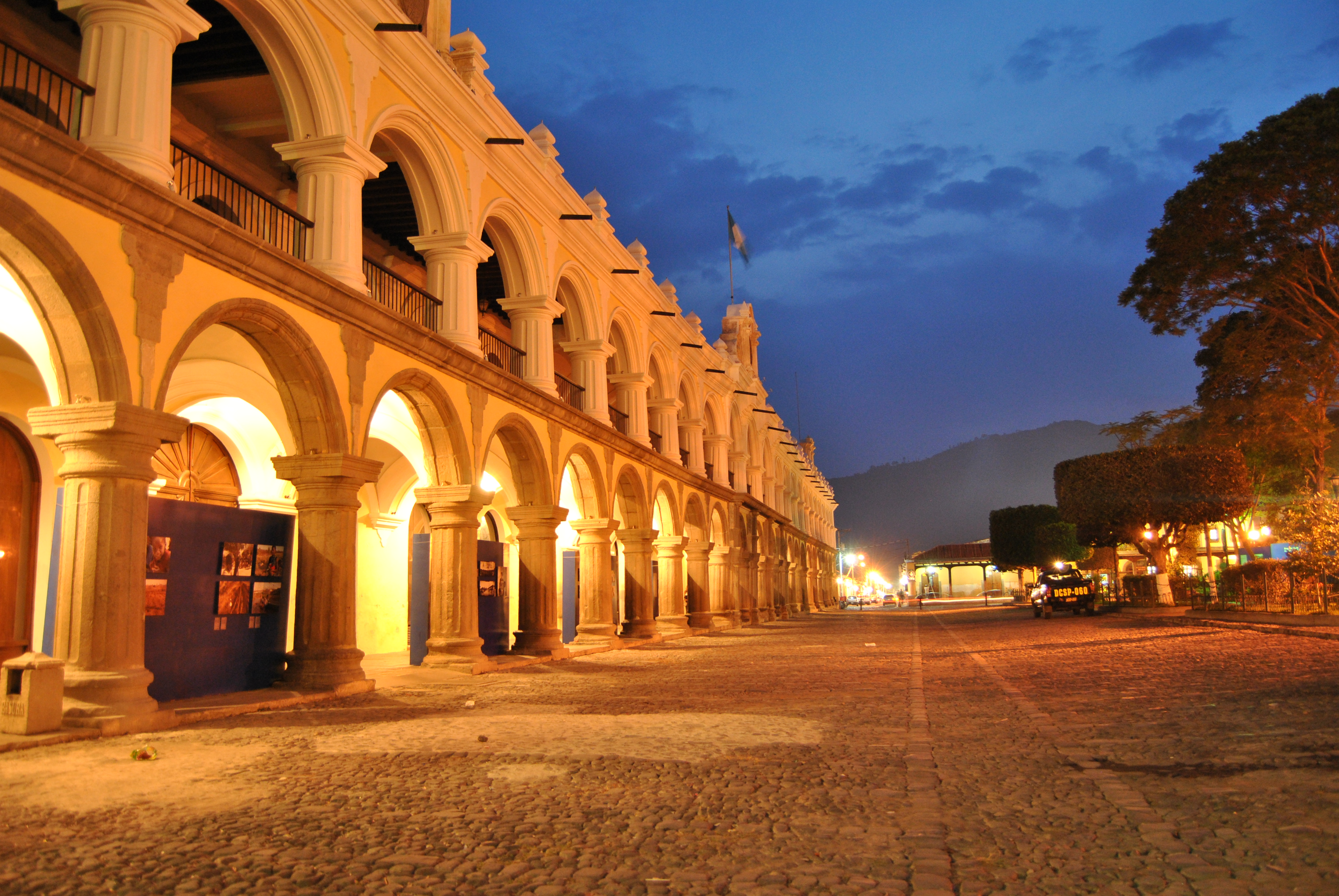
Capitanes Generales Palace in Antigua

Tourism became one of the main drivers of Guatemala's economy, an industry that reported more than $1.8 billion in 2008. Guatemala receives about two million tourists annually.

In recent years, it has led to the visit of many cruise ships that touch important seaports in Guatemala, leading to more tourists visiting the country.

The country's territory encompasses major Classic and Preclassic Maya archaeological centers, including Tikal and El Mirador in the Petén Basin, Quiriguá in Izabal, and Iximche in Chimaltenango. Major natural attractions feature the endorheic volcanic basin of Lake Atitlán and the travertine karst formations of Semuc Champey along the Cahabón River. Cultural and historical tourism centers heavily on Antigua Guatemala, a former Spanish colonial capital designated as a UNESCO World Heritage Site in 1979 for its preserved Baroque architecture and urban grid.

== Infrastructure ==
=== Telecommunications ===
Telecommunications in Guatemala include radio, television, fixed and mobile telephones, and the Internet.

=== Transport ===
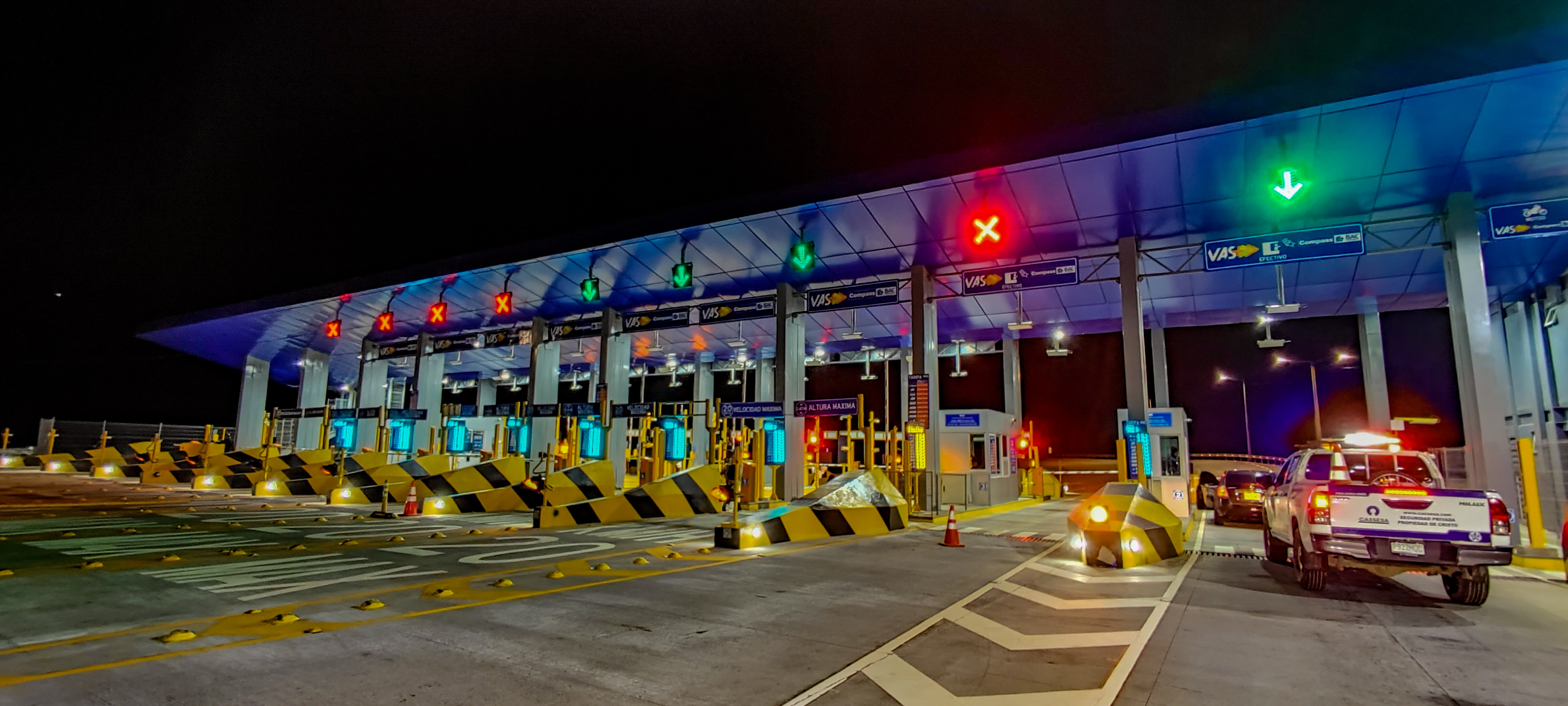
Toll to enter Guatemala City

Transportation in Guatemala includes roads, waterways, airports and a short cross-border rail line from Mexico.

The Ministry of Communications, Infrastructure, and Housing oversees the planning, maintenance and development of infrastructure and transport systems. The General Directorate of Roads is responsible for the planning, design and supervision of construction works and maintenance of the country's roads.

=== Electricity ===
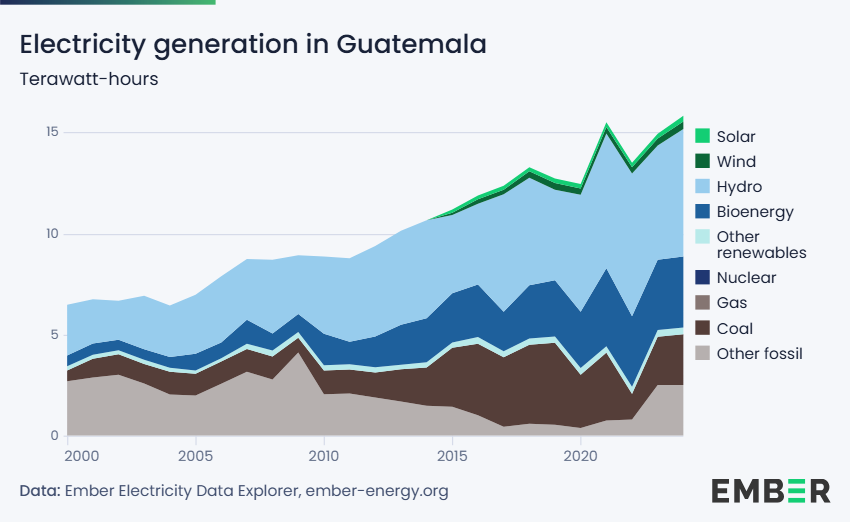
Electricity generation in Guatemala in terawatt-hours

In Guatemala lack of access to electricity is concentrated in rural areas, although informal settlements around urban peripheries also tend to lack metered service. Guatemala's post-civil war efforts to improve electrical access in the countryside have proceeded under the auspices of the Rural Electrification Plan (Spanish: PER), a public-private partnership between the government's Ministry of Education and Mines (Mineduc) and private power companies. Over the period 2000 to 2011, the PER improved rates of electrical grid connectivity among non-indigenous (62 to 82 percent) and indigenous (48 to 70 percent) households in Guatemala. Continuity of the electrical grid is robust, with both groups reporting only about one hour per day of unavailability. Even when rural users are connected to the grid and pay subsidized rates, they often have difficulty affording electrical appliances, which translates into low power consumption (less than five percent of average US residential usage). This low power usage by rural customers is often not profitable for power companies, disincentivizing further expansion of the grid. As of 2014, one third of Guatemala's poorest rural residents still lacked electricity. By contrast, only around 8% of high-income rural residents lacked service, demonstrating that affordability plays a role in the accessibility of electrical grids.

In 2016, domestic hydroelectric power supplied the majority (about 34 percent) of Guatemala's electricity. The planning process for constructing new hydropower dams was updated by the Guatemalan Congress in 1996 and 2007 (Decree 93–96, the "General Law of Electricity"), giving project developers more power over the process, especially with regards to environmental impact assessments (EIA). A study in Guatemala covering the period 2009 to 2014 found that private construction firms generally have little knowledge of the rights of rural indigenous peoples their projects may be affecting. Firms typically hire consultants to perform EIAs and liaise with affected communities. However, consultants are frequently disinterested in adequately informing rural communities of the potential impacts of proposed projects. Instead, consultants frequently resort to bribery and manipulation to obtain consent to proceed with hydroelectric projects. Interlocutors from within the government say that there is internal pressure to approve EIAs even if they are performed inadequately, showing that visions of Guatemala's energy future may be overriding the interests of segments of its populace.

=== Water supply and sanitation infrastructure in Guatemala ===
In 2015, around 1 million people lacked access to "improved" water and 6 million lacked access to "improved" sanitation. In Guatemala, 93% of the total population had access to "improved" water, 98% of the urban population and 87% of the rural population. As for sanitation, 64% of the total population, 78% and 49%, urban and rural respectively, had access to "improved" sanitation.

According to the WHO/UNICEF Joint Monitoring Programme for Water Supply Factory and Sanitation INC, access to water and sanitation services has slowly risen over the years in Guatemala. In 1990, 81% of the total population had access to improved water sources, while in 2004, 90% of the population had access. Sanitation coverage has also risen, from 62% of the total population having access to adequate sanitation in 1990, to 86% with access in 2004. The government of Guatemala estimates that the population with access to water services is growing at a rate of at least 100,001 people every year.

		Urban (49% of the population)	Rural (51% of the population)	Total
Water	Improved	98%	87%	92%
	Piped on Premises	96%	69%	82%
Sanitation	Improved	87%	70%	78%
	Sewerage (2006 JMP survey & census data)	68%	17%	41%

Source: Joint Monitoring Programme for Water Supply and Sanitation WHO/UNICEF

Accurate and reliable data regarding coverage in rural areas is unavailable. Conflicting statistics as to the percentages of the population using improved drinking water sources present difficulties in assessing the seriousness of the problem. Although the data above shows that water and sanitation coverage in both rural and urban areas is fairly high in Guatemala, the National Water and Sanitation Information System (Sistema Nacional de Informacion de Agua y Saneamiento) (SAS), which collects and maintains information regarding water and sanitation in rural communities, released information in 2002 indicating that only 53% of homes (it is assumed that this statistic refers to households in rural areas due to the rural focus of SAS) had access to water services. The SAS considers accessible services to be less than 1 kilometer from a home and that at least 20 liters of water is available to each person every day. While 24,000 rural communities exist in Guatemala, SAS has only collected data from 36% of these, making it difficult to determine the actual number of individuals lacking services.

Access to water in urban areas is irregular, as 80% of urban water systems function for an average of 12 hours every day. As of the year 2000, 25% of water in urban systems was disinfected and only 1% of all collected sewage water has been treated.

== Economic development and poverty in Guatemala ==
From 1990 until 2018, Guatemala was growing with an annual GDP growth oscillating around 3.5%.

Manufacturing (20%), commerce (18%), private services (14%), and agriculture (12%) are the biggest estimated economic sectors in Guatemala. The country's economic structure shows a declining trend in the agricultural sector.

Guatemala is the third biggest country in Central America. It has one of the highest disparities between rich and poor as well as one of the highest poverty levels worldwide, with 54% of the population living below the poverty line in 2006 and 54% in 2011. According to the United Nations Development Programme (UNDP), the Multidimensional Poverty Index (MPI), which looks at multiple deprivations in the same household in regard to education, health and standard of living, found that in 2011, 25.9% of the population experienced multiple deprivations and another 9.8% were vulnerable to such deprivations. A human development report also states that the average percentage of multidimensional poverty in 2011 was 49.1%.

== Macroeconomic development ==
Guatemala became more economically developed and stable from 1990 to 2011. The annual GDP growth rate for Guatemala in 2000 was 3.6%, but just 0.9% in 2009, increasing slightly in 2010 to 2.0%

The poverty rate in Guatemala in 2006 was 54.8%, and the extreme poverty rate was 26.1%. Latin America as a whole had a poverty rate of 33% and an extreme poverty rate of 12.9% in 2009. The data indicate that Guatemala is behind other Latin American countries, in terms of lowering poverty rates, but there has been an increase in economic activity in terms of GDP and development. Guatemala's HDI increased from 0.462 in 1990, to 0.525 in 2000, to 0.550 in 2005, and 0.574 in 2011.3 Guatemala ranked 131st in HDI in 2011. Other important human development statistics such as the total fertility rate in Guatemala decreased from 4.8 births per woman in 2000 to 4.2 births per woman in 2006. During the same period, life expectancy increased from 67.9 years in 2000, to 69.9 years in 2006.

The following table shows the main economic indicators in 1980–2021 (with IMF staff estimates in 2022–2027). Inflation below 5% is in green. The annual unemployment rate is extracted from the World Bank, although the International Monetary Fund find them unreliable.

Year	GDP (in Bil. US$PPP)	GDP per capita (in US$ PPP)	GDP (in Bil. US$nominal)	GDP per capita (in US$ nominal)	GDP growth (real)	Inflation rate (in Percent)	Unemployment (in Percent)	Government debt (in % of GDP)
1980	19.2	2,660.2	7.7	1,070.3	▲3.7%	▲10.7%	n/a	n/a
1981	▲21.1	▲2,857.9	▲8.4	▲1,140.2	▲0.6%	▲11.4%	n/a	n/a
1982	▲21.6	▼2,854.5	▲8.5	▼1,126.2	▼-3.5%	▲4.9%	n/a	n/a
1983	▲21.9	▼2,819.3	▲8.9	▲1,140.0	▼-2.5%	▲6.7%	n/a	n/a
1984	▲22.8	▲2,862.6	▲9.3	▲1,163.1	▲0.5%	▲3.2%	n/a	n/a
1985	▲23.4	▼2,861.9	▲11.0	▲1,338.7	▼-0.6%	▲19.2%	n/a	n/a
1986	▲23.9	▼2,849.4	▼5.9	▼705.8	▲0.1%	▲32.8%	n/a	n/a
1987	▲25.4	▲2,949.2	▲6.9	▲797.0	▲3.6%	▲10.8%	n/a	n/a
1988	▲27.3	▲3,093.7	▲7.4	▲841.8	▲3.9%	▲10.3%	n/a	n/a
1989	▲29.5	▲3,260.3	▲8.6	▲946.8	▲3.9%	▲13.0%	n/a	n/a
1990	▲31.5	▲3,403.7	▼7.5	▼808.9	▲3.1%	▲38.0%	n/a	n/a
1991	▲33.6	▲3,540.5	▲9.2	▲966.0	▲3.0%	▲35.1%	2.6%	n/a
1992	▲35.9	▲3,699.9	▲10.2	▲1,045.4	▲4.6%	▲10.2%	2.6%	n/a
1993	▲38.0	▲3,825.6	▲11.0	▲1,110.0	▲3.4%	▲13.4%	2.6%	n/a
1994	▲40.2	▲3,951.2	▲12.5	▲1,229.0	▲3.5%	▲12.5%	2.6%	n/a
1995	▲42.8	▲4,116.0	▲14.0	▲1,348.9	▲4.4%	▲8.4%	2.6%	n/a
1996	▲44.8	▲4,212.4	▲15.0	▲1,408.2	▲2.8%	▲11.1%	▲2.7%	n/a
1997	▲47.5	▲4,362.0	▲17.0	▲1,559.6	▲4.1%	▲9.2%	2.7%	n/a
1998	▲50.2	▲4,512.1	▲18.4	▲1,656.4	▲4.6%	▲6.6%	2.7%	n/a
1999	▲52.8	▲4,639.2	▼17.4	▼1,527.2	▲3.7%	▲5.2%	2.7%	n/a
2000	▲55.4	▲4,752.9	▲18.1	▲1,555.6	▲2.5%	▲6.0%	2.7%	18.0%
2001	▲58.0	▲4,862.2	▲19.7	▲1,655.0	▲2.4%	▲7.3%	▲2.8%	▲19.1%
2002	▲61.4	▲5,027.9	▲21.9	▲1,795.8	▲4.2%	▲8.1%	2.8%	▼17.4%
2003	▲64.2	▲5,138.5	▲23.1	▲1,847.3	▲2.6%	▲5.6%	2.8%	▲19.8%
2004	▲67.9	▲5,307.3	▲25.0	▲1,951.8	▲3.0%	▲7.6%	▲3.0%	▲20.6%
2005	▲72.2	▲5,512.6	▲28.2	▲2,151.7	▲3.1%	▲9.1%	▲3.1%	▼20.0%
2006	▲78.6	▲5,864.7	▲31.3	▲2,337.0	▲5.6%	▲6.6%	3.1%	▲20.9%
2007	▲85.6	▲6,246.2	▲35.0	▲2,556.8	▲6.0%	▲6.8%	3.1%	▼20.8%
2008	▲90.4	▲6,454.9	▲40.2	▲2,873.1	▲3.7%	▲11.4%	▲3.3%	▼19.6%
2009	▲91.6	▼6,395.8	▼38.0	▼2,654.1	▲0.6%	▲1.9%	▲3.5%	▲22.8%
2010	▲95.3	▲6,511.4	▲41.5	▲2,836.1	▲2.8%	▲3.9%	3.5%	▲24.0%
2011	▲101.6	▲6,794.3	▲47.4	▲3,172.1	▲4.4%	▲6.2%	▼3.1%	▼23.8%
2012	▲107.2	▲7,017.7	▲49.9	▲3,267.8	▲3.1%	▲3.8%	▼2.8%	▲24.6%
2013	▲112.0	▲7,183.1	▲53.0	▲3,397.6	▲3.5%	▲4.3%	▲3.0%	▲25.0%
2014	▲118.8	▲7,457.9	▲57.8	▲3,632.1	▲4.4%	▲3.4%	▼2.7%	▼24.7%
2015	▲127.6	▲7,849.1	▲62.2	▲3,825.9	▲4.1%	▲2.4%	▼2.5%	▲24.8%
2016	▲130.1	▼7,847.2	▲66.0	▲3,982.0	▲2.7%	▲4.4%	▲2.6%	▲25.0%
2017	▲133.9	▲7,912.5	▲71.6	▲4,233.0	▲3.1%	▲4.4%	▼2.5%	▲25.1%
2018	▲141.8	▲8,210.5	▲73.3	▲4,247.5	▲3.4%	▲3.8%	▼2.3%	▲26.4%
2019	▲150.1	▲8,518.5	▲77.2	▲4,379.8	▲4.0%	▲3.7%	▼2.2%	26.4%
2020	▼149.2	▼8,300.2	▲77.6	▼4,318.6	▼-1.8%	▲3.2%	▲3.6%	▲31.5%
2021	▲167.8	▲9,148.9	▲86.0	▲4,687.8	▲8.0%	▲4.3%	3.6%	▼30.8%
2022	▲185.8	▲9,931.4	▲91.3	▲4,879.9	▲3.4%	▲6.4%	n/a	▼30.1%
2023	▲198.6	▲10,402.8	▲95.6	▲5,006.7	▲3.2%	▲5.6%	n/a	▼30.0%
2024	▲210.6	▲10,809.0	▲102.9	▲5,280.9	▲3.8%	▲4.3%	n/a	▼29.7%
2025	▲222.3	▲11,183.1	▲110.2	▲5,545.5	▲3.6%	▲4.0%	n/a	▼29.6%
2026	▲234.6	▲11,564.2	▲117.9	▲5,815.0	▲3.5%	▲4.0%	n/a	▼29.4%
2027	▲247.5	▲11,957.2	▲126.1	▲6,094.9	▲3.5%	▲4.0%	n/a	▼29.3%

== Poor women and unpaid work ==
In Guatemala in 2010, 31% of the female population was illiterate. In rural Guatemala, 70.5% are poor; women are more likely to be poor in the more rural areas. Gammage argues that women in poor households engage more in domestic tasks and undertake more household maintenance, social reproduction and care work than men. Similarly, Benería states that the women perform tough work but do not get paid and argues that there is an opportunity cost related, since the women could be paid for other work instead. Unpaid household work is associated with the number of people in the household, the location, and the availability of paid employment. This means that women in rural Guatemala are greater victims of poverty than urban women, and most poverty is found in the rural parts of Guatemala, so Gammage found that many rural women perform unpaid work.

== Educated women and the labor force ==
The labor force participation rate for women in Guatemala was at 41% in 2018. Women have a small pay disadvantage, earning 97% of male wages in most occupations. Gender inequality declines if women have a second and/or third educational degree, and they are treated more equally with their male counterparts. As in many countries, both men and women earn the most if they have a university degree. The percent of women with a steady income increases for women who have completed the secondary level of schooling, but decreases again after university. This means that women earn about the same as men if they both have a secondary education, but after university, men earn more. The situation changes on the professional level, where women earn more than men. Men work more hours in all professions, except in the household, because many women have part-time jobs.

== Child labor ==
Children in Guatemala are engaged in child labor, primarily in agriculture, according to the U.S. Department of Labor. In fact, 13.4% of children aged 7 to 14 work; 68% of them are in the agricultural sector, 13% in the industrial sector, and 18% in the services sector. The 2013 DOL report stated that "Guatemala [...] lacks Government programs targeting sectors in which children are known to engage in exploitative labor, such as domestic service, mining, quarrying, and construction." In December 2014, the Department's List of Goods Produced by Child Labor or Forced Labor included mostly agricultural goods produced in such working conditions, namely broccoli, coffee, corn and sugarcane. Guatemala's firework and gravel production also resorted to child labor according to the report.

== Maquilas ==
Among the most important factors in Guatemala's economy are the significant number of Korean-owned maquila factories in the highlands of Guatemala. Korean entrepreneurs have adopted a buyer-driven commodity chain process that depends on the existence of a large labor force, low capital investment and low skills. Korea presents itself to Guatemalan industry and to Guatemalan workers by means of subcontractors responsible for delivering finished orders to multiple buyers, mostly located in the United States. Buyers include Macy's and JCPenney and brands such as Liz Claiborne, OshKosh and Tracy Evans.

The first industries began in 1980s. At first, workers were very interested in the new jobs in the factories, because they offered the opportunity to transition to what was seen as a new and modern world, away from agricultural work. However, in the factories, workers' backs hurt, because they sat for many hours on backless benches in front of sewing machines. Workers would usually enter the plant at 7:00 a.m. and take a 1-hour break for lunch at noon. They were expected to work until 7:00 or 8:00pm. About 70% of the workers in macula factories were female. Years later, there was a huge turnover. Workers started to leave the maquila factories for reasons including stress, bad treatment, poor payment, etc.

The legal framework as of 2024 is the Law for the Promotion and Development of Export Activities and Maquilas aimed mainly at the apparel and textile sector and at services exporters such as call centers and business processes outsourcing (BPO) companies. The government grants investors in these two sectors a 10-year income tax exemption. Additionally there is an exemption from duties and value-added taxes (VAT) on imported machinery and equipment and a one-year suspension of the same duties and taxes on imports of production inputs, samples, and packing material.

== Economic priorities and trade ==
Exports of Guatemala by product category (2019) Chemical products Transportation Machines Mineral products Plastics and rubbers Metals Foodstuffs Precious metals Textiles Instruments Animal products Vegetable products Paper goods Footwear and headwear Miscellaneous Stone and glass Wood products Animal and vegetable bi-products Animal hides Arts and antiques Weapons

Current economic priorities include:

- Liberalizing the trade regime;
- Financial services sector reform;
- Overhauling Guatemala's public finances;
- Simplifying the tax structure, enhancing tax compliance, and broadening the tax base.
- Improving the investment climate through procedural and regulatory simplification and adopting a goal of concluding treaties to protect investment and intellectual property rights.

Import tariffs have been lowered in conjunction with Guatemala's Central American neighbors so that most fall between 0% and 15%, with further reductions planned. Responding to Guatemala's changed political and economic policy environment, the international community has mobilized substantial resources to support the country's economic and social development objectives. The United States, along with other donor countries—especially France, Italy, Spain, Germany, Japan, and the international financial institutions—have increased development project financing. Donors' response to the need for international financial support funds for implementation of the Peace Accords is, however, contingent upon Guatemalan government reforms and counterpart financing.

Problems hindering economic growth include high crime rates, illiteracy and low levels of education, and an inadequate and underdeveloped capital market. They also include lack of infrastructure, particularly in the transportation, telecommunications, and electricity sectors, although the state telephone company and electricity distribution were privatized in 1998. The distribution of income and wealth remains highly skewed. The wealthiest 10% of the population receives almost one-half of all income, and the top 20% receives two-thirds of all income. Approximately 29% of the population lives in poverty, and 6% of that number live in extreme poverty. Guatemala's social indicators, such as infant mortality and illiteracy, are successively improving, but remain in low growth and are still among the worst in the hemisphere. In 2000 the percentage of girls completing primary school was approximately 52%. That percentage rose in 2010 to about 81%. The completion rate in primary school for boys in 2000 was 63% and rose to 87% in 2010.

In 2005 Guatemala ratified its signature to the Dominican Republic-Central America Free Trade Agreement (DR-CAFTA) between the United States and several other Central American countries.

The electricity sector is being privatized, resulting in very high prices. In rural areas, although electricity consumption per household is very low, the ratings can represent more than 20% of farmers' salaries according to the Comité de développement paysan (Codeca). Since privatization, the price per kilowatthour has risen to the point of becoming one of the most expensive in Latin America. To protest against this situation and demand the renationalization of electrical services, Codeca members organized demonstrations and exposed themselves to repression. Between 2012 and 2014, 97 people were imprisoned, 220 wounded and 17 killed.

=== 2009 food crisis ===
In September 2009, Guatemalan President Álvaro Colom stated that the situation reduced the domestic food supply and reduced Guatemala's ability to import food. Colom said the government would immediately seek assistance for emergency food supplies.

A number of international organizations expressed concern about Guatemala's economic status in 2009. They were the United Nations World Food Programme (WFP) and the World Bank.

== See also ==
- List of companies of Guatemala
- Crime in Guatemala
- Illegal drug trade in Guatemala
- Prostitution in Guatemala
- Climate finance in Guatemala
- Guatemala and the International Monetary Fund
- Guatemala and the World Bank
- Bank of Guatemala
- Ministry of Economy (Guatemala)
- Ministry of Public Finance
- Ministry of Agriculture, Livestock and Food (Guatemala)
- Ministry of Labor and Social Welfare (Guatemala)
- Ministry of Social Development (Guatemala)
- Economy of Central America
