= Mineral industry of Guatemala =

The mineral industry of Guatemala includes:

- The Marlin Mine, a gold mine owned by Montana Exploradora de Guatemala, S.A (Montana), a subsidiary of Canadian company Goldcorp.
- The El Estor mine, one of the largest nickel mines in Guatemala. The mine is located in El Estor in Izabal Department. The mine has reserves amounting to 50 million tonnes of ore grading 1.5% nickel.
- The Fenix nickel project is a nickel resource in Guatemala which was sold by Hudbay in 2011 for $170 million to the Russian owned Solway Group, headquartered in Cyprus. The operation had been on care and maintenance since 1980. It includes a brownfield nickel laterite mine and a process plant. The mine is located in El Estor in Izabal Department. The mine has reserves amounting to 36.1 million tonnes of ore grading 1.86% nickel.
- The Uspantán mine is one of the largest nickel mines in Guatemala. The mine is located in Uspantán in Quiché Department. The mine has reserves amounting to 40 million tonnes of ore grading 1.25% nickel.
- The Escobal mine is a large silver mine located east of San Rafael Las Flores in the south of Guatemala in Jalapa Department. Escobal represents one of the largest silver reserve in Guatemala and in the world having estimated reserves of 367.5 million oz of silver.
- The Canibal mine is a titanium mine in Guatemala. The mine is located in Cuilco in Huehuetenango Department. The mine has reserves amounting to 50 million tonnes of ore grading 19.43% titanium.

== Opposition to mining ==
There is a political opposition in Guatemala to mining, particularly open pit mining, financed by international organizations. Opposition is based on both environmental concerns and opposition to globalization. The indigenous Maya peoples organizations have been extremely active in opposing international mining projects despite government support of them. In particular the Escobal mine protests have seen substantial anti-mining activism by the Xinca people.
