= Mihhail Bronštein =

Estonian economist (1923–2022)

Mihhail Bronštein (Russian: Михаил Лазаревич Бронштейн, romanized: Mikhail Lazarevich Bronshtein; 23 January 1923 – 09 April 2022) was a Soviet and Estonian economist, member of the Estonian Academy of Sciences.

== Economic and political views ==
In an interview Bronštein admitted that he started as a orthodoxal Marxist. However over time his views undergone evolution and he argued in favor of introducing of the elements of market economy in agriculture. For this he was attacked by the chief Soviet ideologist Mikhail Suslov. Nevertheless the efforts of Bronštein had led to considerable improvement of Estonian agriculture and condition of its workers, compared to the rest of the Soviet Union. After Estonia regained its sovereignty Bronštein was instrumental in economic reforms of the country.

== Books ==
- Väärtus, hind ja hinnapoliitika. Tallinn, 1964 (with H. Metsa)
- Природно-экономические различия и стимулирование колхозного производства. Moscow, 1968
- Земля и хозрасчетные отношения. Moscow, 1978
- Экономическая оценка природных ресурсов. Tallinn, 1981
- The Baltic Transit. Almanac. Tallinn, 1996

== Awards and decorations ==
- 1985: Meritorious Scientist of the Estonian SSR
- 1988: Medal of the Estonian Academy of Sciences
- 2006: Order of the White Star, 3rd Class

== Personal life ==
He spent his last years in Antibes, France.

He was married to Bella Barskaya (Russian: Белла Барская), who used to teach at the Tartu University; Alexander Bronstein is their son. The Tallinn Synagogue is known as Beit Bella in memory of Bella Barskaya.
