= Rosemont Copper =

Proposed open pit copper mine in Arizona

Rosemont Copper Mine
- Location within Arizona
- Location: Arizona, United States; 31°51′05″N 110°45′26″W
- Products: Copper
- Opened: not yet operational
- Company: Hudbay

Rosemont Copper was a proposed large open pit copper mine project owned by Hudbay. The project site is located within the Santa Rita Mountains and Coronado National Forest, in Pima County of southern Arizona. It has undergone a permitting review process under the direction of the United States Forest Service and the U.S. Army Corps of Engineers and has been delayed by legal judgements and suspension of its operating permit by the US Army Corps of Engineers.

The Rosemont Copper Mine site is approximately 30 miles (48 km) southeast of Tucson. The nearest established communities are Sonoita, Patagonia, Sahuarita, Green Valley, Corona de Tucson, and Vail.

Opponents argue that the mine will pollute surface and subsurface water and damage aquifer quality and quantity, destroy natural habitats and endangering populations of vulnerable and unique wildlife, cause regional air pollution, and harm the local tourism industry.

Proponents argue that the project will create jobs, generate tax revenue and reduce American dependence on foreign sources of copper.

Following legal review of Rosemont's permits, on July 31, 2019, U.S. District Judge James Soto overturned the U.S. Forest Service's 2017 decision approving the mine and its 2013 final environmental impact statement clearing the way for that approval. On August 23, 2019, the US Army Corps of Engineers issued a letter to Rosemont Copper Company that immediately suspended its permit. In May 2022, the Ninth Circuit upheld District Court Judge Soto's order blocking the proposed mine on grounds of the 1872 Mining Law. The Ninth Circuit's decision was not appealed to the Supreme Court. The ruling affects other potential mines in the Ninth Circuit that may seek to dispose of waste on public lands under color of the 1872 Mining Law.

== Context ==
The Rosemont Copper property is located in Pima County, approximately 30 miles (48 km) southeast of Tucson. It straddles two historic mining districts: the Rosemont Mining District and the adjacent Helvetia Mining District.

Copper became the focus of mining in the Santa Cruz Valley and elsewhere in Southern Arizona beginning in the late 1880s. By 1907, Southern Arizona led world copper production. Sporadic prospecting reportedly began in the northwestern portion of the Rosemont property, in the Helvetia Mining District, in the mid-1800s. Production from mines on both sides of the northern Santa Rita Mountains brought forth construction and operation of the Columbia Smelter at Helvetia on the west side of the Santa Rita Mountains and the Rosemont Smelter in the Rosemont Mining District on the east side of the Santa Rita Mountains.

Copper production ceased in 1951. In the decades since, the area continued to be the site of successive exploration efforts. In 1956, the American Exploration and Mining Company began exploring the Broadtop Butte prospect. Banner Mining Company acquired most of the claims in the area by the late 1950s. Anaconda Mining Company acquired the claims to the property in 1963 and undertook a major exploration campaign that identified the Rosemont deposit as a major porphyry copper ore body. The company also advanced the Broadtop Butte and Peach-Elgin prospects. The project continued after Amax and Anaconda formed the Anamax partnership and ceased in 1986 when Anamax sold the property to a real estate company during the dissolution of Anaconda. ASARCO purchased the property in 1988, renewed exploration of the Peach-Elgin prospect and initiated engineering studies. ASARCO sold the entire property to real estate interests in 2004. Augusta acquired the Rosemont Property in 2005. Hudbay acquired the property in 2014.

=== Mineral rights ===
The core of the Rosemont property consists of 132 patented lode claims that encompass an area of 1,968 acres (796 ha). A patented mining claim is one for which the federal government has passed its title to the claimant, making it private land. A contiguous package of 850 unpatented lode mining claims with an aggregate area of approximately 12,000 acres (4,900 ha) surrounds the core of patented claims. An unpatented mine claim is one in which land is essentially leased from the government for the purpose of extracting minerals. Most of the unpatented claims are on federal land administered by the United States Forest Service. In addition, a limited number of claims in the northwest portion of the Property are on federal land administered by the Bureau of Land Management.

== Resources ==
Rosemont has proven and probable reserves of 5.9 billion lbs of copper and 194 million lbs of molybdenum and inferred sulfide mineral resources of 1.1 billion lbs of copper and 35 million lbs of molybdenum.

=== Geology ===
The regional, local and property geology of the Rosemont deposit consists of Precambrian sedimentary and intrusive rocks, which form the regional basement under a Palaeozoic sequence of quartzites, siltstones, and carbonate rocks. Sedimentary deposition ceased for a time during uplift and formation of a widespread unconformity in the early Mesozoic, and then resumed with the deposition of continental and shallow marine deposits.

Subsequent granitic intrusions and felsic volcanic eruptions dominated the late Mesozoic and early Cenozoic, corresponding to the Laramide Orogeny when most of the porphyry copper deposits of the region formed. Compressional tectonics during the Laramide Orogeny created both low-angle thrust faults and high-angle strike-slip faults. Extensional tectonic activity followed the Laramide Orogeny and was accompanied by voluminous felsic volcanic eruptions. Numerous low-angle normal faults formed during this time. These faults have been particularly important in the Rosemont area. The extensional tectonics eventually produced the large-scale block faulting that produced the present Basin and Range Province throughout the southwestern United States.

== History ==
In 2007, Augusta Resource Corporation, Rosemont Copper's parent company, filed a Mine Plan of Operations with the U.S. Forest Service for a proposed open-pit mine in the Santa Rita Mountains section of the Coronado National Forest. Rosemont Copper submitted a revised mine plan in July 2007. The official start to Rosemont Copper's National Environmental Policy Act (NEPA) process began in February 2008.

In March 2008, The Coronado National Forest began their NEPA scoping process for the Environmental Impact Statement. Over 11,000 scoping comment submissions were received. The Draft EIS for Rosemont contained approximately 400 reports on topics such as air quality, water resources, soils and reclamation, and biological resources. The public comment period for Rosemont's draft EIS closed on January 31, 2012. The Forest Service Southwestern Regional Office released their Final Environmental Impact Statement (FEIS) and draft Record of Decision (ROD) for the Rosemont Copper Project on December 13, 2013. On June 6, 2017, the Coronado National Forest completed their Record of Decision for the Project (ROD).

Rosemont's permits faced legal hurdles. Following his legal examination of the issued permits for the Rosemont Mine, on July 31, 2019, U.S. District Judge James Soto overturned the U.S. Forest Service's 2017 decision approving the mine and its 2013 final environmental impact statement clearing the way for that approval. Specifically, he ruled that the mining company cannot put its waste rock and mine tailings on Forest Service land even though it has mining claims on it because it has failed to prove the claims are valid. The Mining Act of 1872 has long been interpreted to convey the same mineral rights to such lands by the Forest Service and the Bureau of Land Management.

Following the determination from Judge Soto that Rosemont's attempt to use Forest Service land for waste disposal was invalid, on August 23, 2019, General D. Peter Hemlinger PE, Division Commander, Northwestern Division, US Army Corps of Engineers wrote a letter to Ms. Katherine Ann Arnold, PE, Director of Environment for Hudbay, that rescinded Rosemont's operating permit. Gen. Hemlinger wrote: "I am writing to inform you that I am suspending your Department of the Army (DA) permit, issued on March 8, 2019, for the Rosemont Copper project (SPL-2008-00816- MB). This suspension is effective immediately."

In May 2022, the Ninth Circuit upheld District Court Judge Soto's order blocking the proposed mine on grounds of the 1872 Mining Law. The Ninth Circuit's decision was not appealed to the Supreme Court. The ruling affects other potential mines in the Ninth Circuit that may seek to dispose of waste on public lands under color of the 1872 Mining Law. Hudbay is now seeking partners for a new mine proposal, Copper World, that would be entirely restricted to its privately held property near Helvetia, at least until such time as permission can be obtained for disposal of waste on federal lands.

== Permits and approvals ==
Before the Ninth Circuit ruling invalidated the basis for the use of Forest land, Rosemont Copper had secured the following major permits necessary to begin construction on the proposed mine:

- Record of Decision (ROD) memorializes the Forest Service decision and summarizes the requirements determined during the EIS process.
- Aquifer Protection Permit is needed if you own or operate a facility that discharges a pollutant either directly to an aquifer or to the land surface or to the vadose zone (the area between land surface and the water table where the moisture content is less than saturation) in such a manner that there is a reasonable probability that the pollutant will reach an aquifer.
- Construction Storm Water General Permit is required for any point source discharge of pollutants to a water of the United States. Because storm water runoff can transport pollutants to either a municipal separate storm sewer system or to a water of the United States, permits are required for those discharges.
- Agriculture Land Clearing Permit is for any activity that includes the clearing of more than 1-acre of land (0.40 ha) and which is not exempt by this ordinance, shall be required to have a Clearing Permit.
- Air Activity Permit PDEQ protects air quality by regulating fugitive dust emissions. The Activity Permit Program ensures that individuals are aware of fugitive dust emissions regulations and requires them to provide information regarding the location and types of activities so the department can monitor compliance.
- Air Quality Permit regulates pollutants to ensure that these emissions do not harm public health or cause significant deterioration in areas that presently have clean air.
- Groundwater Withdrawal Permit is a right to use non-irrigation withdrawals of groundwater equal to the maximum groundwater withdrawal and use for any one year during the five-year period prior to 1980.
- Type 2.02 and 3.03 General Aquifer Protection Permits is for a facility that discharges a pollutant either directly to an aquifer or to the land surface or the vadose zone (the area between an aquifer and the land surface) in such a manner that there is a reasonable probability that the pollutant will reach an aquifer.
- Certificate of Environmental Compatibility and Encroachment Permit is a request for transmission lines to a project when no existing lines could serve the purpose.

The Rosemont proposal received the following approvals before the Ninth Circuit ruling:

- 401 Certification certifies that discharges associated with the project will meet all water quality standards.
- Arizona Mined Land Reclamation Plan Approval is a plan for post-mining operations to correct the disturbed land used for mining.
- Hazardous Waste Identification Number is the first step in the hazardous waste management system. Correctly determining whether a waste meets the RCRA definition of hazardous waste is essential to determining how the waste must be managed.

== Reactions ==
The concerns about mining in the northern Santa Rita Mountains revolve around potential risks to the environment, with water being the number one concern.

In general, opponents argue that open-pit copper mines pollute surrounding air and water supplies with mercury, lead, arsenic or other elements and that the mine will damage regional tourism. EPA has shown that copper mining in Arizona generates substantial radioactive waste, called TENORM (Technologically Enhanced Naturally Occurring Radioactive Materials), and TENORM from the Rosemont Mine has been cited as a major environmental concern.

Proponents argue that the Rosemont mine will provide economic benefits to the region, including jobs and tax revenue, as well as help reduce U.S. dependence on foreign sources of minerals.

Opposition to the project is led by Save the Scenic Santa Ritas (SSSR) and includes the Center for Biological Diversity, Coalition for Sonoran Desert Protection, Defenders of Wildlife, Sierra Club, Sky Island Alliance, and Tucson Audubon Society.

The Rosemont Copper project has been endorsed by Arizona Builders' Alliance, Alliance of Construction Trades, Tucson Hispanic Chamber of Commerce Board of Directors, Tucson Metropolitan Chamber of Commerce, Marana Chamber of Commerce, Southern Arizona Contractors Association, Tucson Utility Contractors Association, Arizona Contractors Association, City of Benson, Southeast Arizona Economic Development Group, and Northern Pima County Chamber of Commerce.

The Rosemont Mine has also faced considerable political opposition. The Pima County (AZ) Board of Supervisors published a memorandum in opposition to the Rosemont Mine on April 16, 2019. In part, the memorandum states: "After nearly a decade of controversy, it is clear that meaningful mitigation of this mine's impacts has not been achieved. If anything, regulatory agencies and proponents involved appear to be backsliding on their previous and specific commitments. The fundamental administration of national environmental laws is also retrogressing. Increasing levels of surprise, controversy and a sense of unfair treatment and lack of concern for the public interest has resulted in a spate of lawsuits, even as federal and state agencies have issued the requisite permits. There is no community consensus on whether the prospective benefits to the economy would outweigh the known impacts to land and water in both the Santa Cruz and Cienega watersheds.

=== Arguments against the proposal ===
- Open-pit copper mines such as that proposed by Rosemont pollute the air and nearby water supplies with mercury, lead, arsenic or other poisons.
- Rosemont Mine will consume approximately 6,000 acre-feet of potable water per year for mining operations.
- The economies of the Santa Rita Mountains communities are largely driven by outdoor recreation and tourism. Even modest impact from the Rosemont Mine could discourage tourism to the region, and destroy more than the number of new jobs the mine would create.
- The mine poses a risk to the habitat of the last known living wild jaguar in the United States, El Jefe.
- Construction and operation of the mine will severely impact Arizona Scenic Route 83, a two-lane, winding road that is the only access road for mine construction, equipment transportation, and copper concentrate shipping.

=== Arguments in favor of the proposal ===
- Copper is an essential component of a clean-energy economy. For example, hybrid cars contain twice as much copper as conventional cars.
- The mine would import 105% of the water needed for operations and leave a 5% net water gain to the Tucson Active Management Area basin.
- The used land will be reclaimed from the beginning of the mine's operations.
- The EIS found that the project will meet all environmental requirements and meet all environmental standards required by the regulatory agencies.
- A dry-stack tailings storage method will be used to conserve water and keep pollution from seeping into the ground.
- The mine would create a much-needed economic boost to the region, directly employing 400 people for at least 19 years and support 1,700 indirect jobs. Historically, mining jobs are among the highest paying positions in Arizona, and experienced workers in the copper industry in the southwest can earn an average of $59,000 or more per year.
- The project would support ancillary industries – contractors and vendors providing goods and services to the mine operation during the nearly two decades of operation.
