= Tallinn Synagogue =

Orthodox synagogue in Tallinn, Estonia

- Estonian: Tallinna sünagoog
- The synagogue in 2012

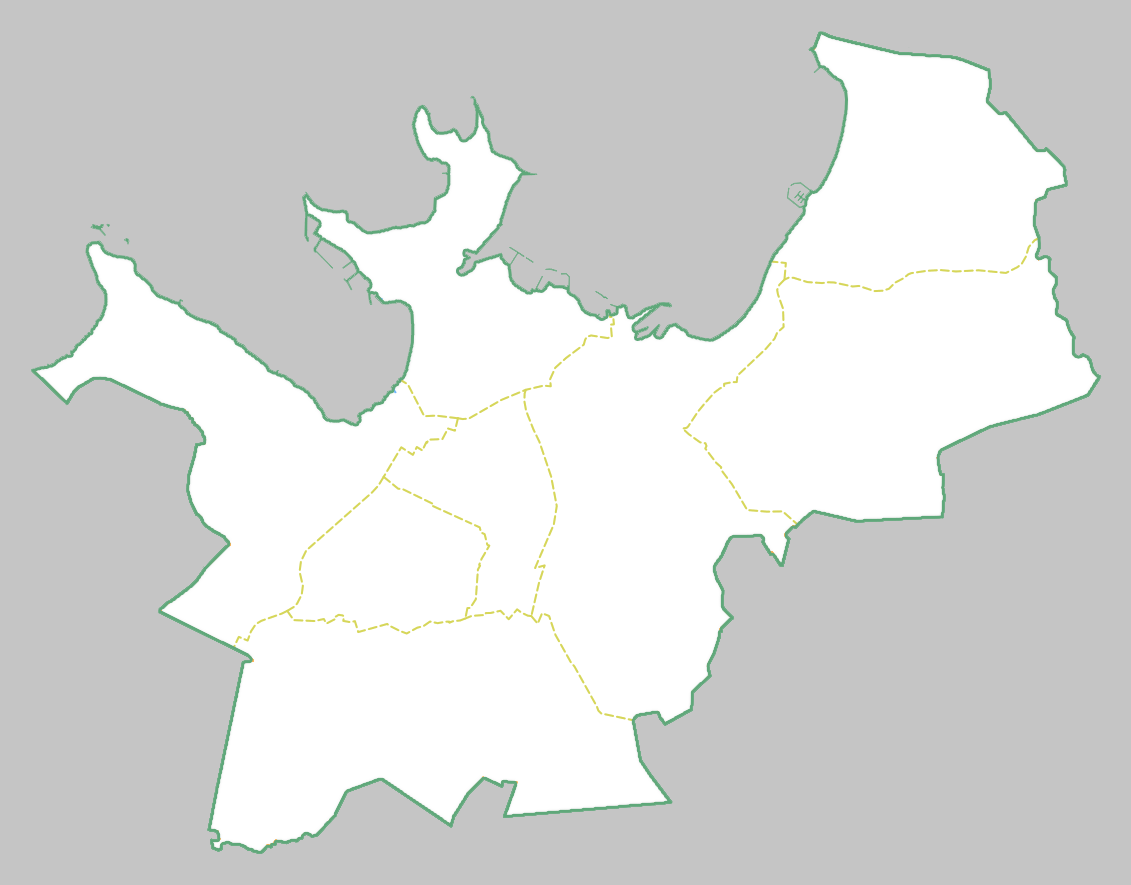
- Location in Tallinn

Religion
- Affiliation: Orthodox Judaism
- Ecclesiastical or organizational status: Synagogue
- Leadership: Rabbi Shmuel Kot
- Status: Active

Location
- Location: Tallinn
- Country: Estonia
- Interactive map of Tallinn Synagogue
- Coordinates: 59°26′19″N 24°46′00″E

Architecture
- Architect: KOKO Architects
- Type: Synagogue architecture
- Style: Modernist
- Completed: 2007
- Construction cost: $4 million

Specifications
- Capacity: 180
- Materials: Glass and concrete

Website
- www.ejc.ee

Tallinn Synagogue, (Estonian: Tallinna sünagoog), also known as Beit Bella Synagogue, is located in Tallinn, Estonia.

The privately funded synagogue in central Tallinn was inaugurated on May 16, 2007. The building is an ultramodern, airy structure, which can seat 180 people with additional seating for up to 230 people for concerts and other public events. It received global attention as it was the first synagogue to open in Estonia since World War II.

The synagogue was named Beit Bella in memory of Bella Barskaya, wife of the prominent Estonian economist, academician Mihhail Bronštein.

== See also ==
- History of the Jews in Estonia
- The Holocaust in Estonia
