= El Jefe (jaguar) =

Rare wild jaguar sighted in Arizona, U.S.

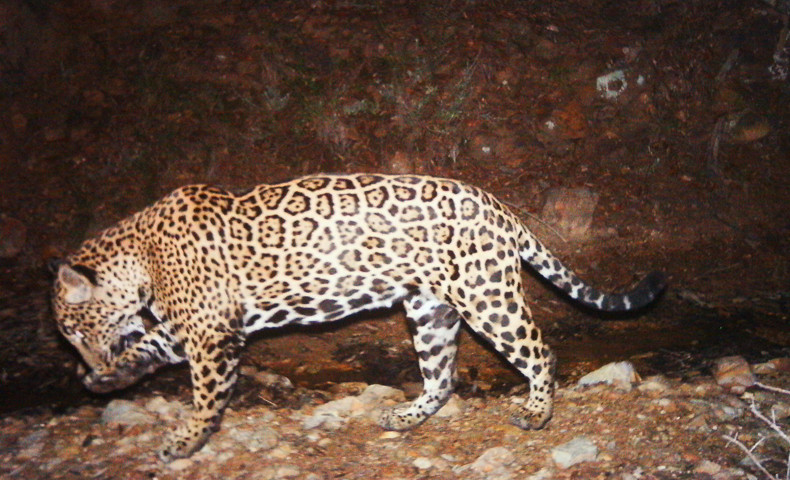
- El Jefe in Arizona, 2013
- Species: Jaguar
- Sex: Male
- Born: Likely Sierra Madre, northwest Mexico
- Known for: Being one of the few wild jaguars to have been recently sighted in the U.S.A.
- Residence: Mexico, North America

El Jefe is an adult, male jaguar that was seen in Arizona. He was first recorded in the Whetstone Mountains in November 2011, and was later photographed over several years in the Santa Rita Mountains. From November 2011 to late 2015, El Jefe was the only wild jaguar verified to live in the United States since the death of Arizona Jaguar Macho B in 2009. According to "Notes on the Occurrences of Jaguars in Arizona and New Mexico", an article regarding jaguars in the Southwest US, "Sixty two jaguars have been reportedly killed or captured in the American Southwest since 1900." He was not seen in Arizona after September 2015 and it was presumed that he returned to Mexico, where the nearest breeding population of jaguars is located. This was confirmed almost seven years later in August 2022, when a collective of conservation groups announced that he had been photographed using a motion-detecting camera, on November 27, 2021, in the central part of the state of Sonora.

His name – which is Spanish for The Boss – was chosen by students of the Felizardo Valencia Middle School of Tucson, in a contest organized by the non-profit conservation group Center for Biological Diversity in November 2015 and has been used frequently by conservation groups and media.

== First sighting ==
El Jefe was first sighted by cougar hunter and guide Donnie Fenn, and his 10-year-old daughter, in the Whetstone Mountains on 19 November 2011. His hunting dogs chased the animal until it climbed a tree. Fenn took several photographs of the jaguar, and later contacted state wildlife officials. In a news conference organized by the Arizona Game and Fish Department the following Tuesday, Fenn stated that the jaguar, an adult male, climbed down the tree and was chased up a second tree after he had injured some of the dogs in his retreat. Fenn called off his dogs and left the scene.

The photographs represent the first evidence of the existence of a wild jaguar in the United States since the death of Macho B in 2009. Several news outlets published the photographs. However, a video said to have been taken at the scene is not publicly available.

== Appearance in the Santa Rita Mountains ==
On 20 December 2012, through a joint news release the US Fish and Wildlife Service, Arizona Game and Fish Department and the University of Arizona, announced that pictures of a jaguar taken in late November of that year, in the Santa Rita Mountains using camera-traps, belonged to the same individual photographed by Fenn one year earlier. The camera-traps were set by the Jaguar Survey and Monitoring Project an initiative led by the University of Arizona. Individual jaguars can be identified by their unique spot patterns, which allowed researchers to confirm it was the same adult male.

== Continued monitoring ==
Since the emergence of the Santa Rita photographs of El Jefe in 2012, several new pictures and some videos have been released by agencies and groups working in the area, notably by the Wild Cat Research and Conservation Center at the University of Arizona and Conservation CATalyst. A video from Conservation CATalyst with shots from different days gained much attention in the news when it was jointly released with the Center for Biological Diversity.

El Jefe was also monitored by Conservation CATalyst's scat detection dog Mayke. Mayke discovered the first genetically verified jaguar scats in the United States and had over a hundred novel detections of jaguar sign.

== Reappearance in Central Sonora ==
On August 3, 2022, a collective of conservation groups named Borderlands Linkages Initiative, coordinated by Wildlands Network, announced through a news release shared with the Arizona Daily Star that one of their member groups, Protección de la Fauna Mexicana, A.C. PROFAUNA, had obtained two pictures of El Jefe in an undisclosed location of central Sonora. The pictures had been taken several months earlier, on November 27, 2021, but identification – conducted by Northern Jaguar Project, a third member of the collective – was only made on the last week of July 2022 because of the time it took to retrieve the camera data, process it and compare it to an existing database of known individuals in the borderlands region. On the days following August 4, El Jefe's reappearance attracted much attention from news outlets in both Mexico and the U.S.

== Significance and origin ==
El Jefe is significant as he represented, for four years, the only verified jaguar currently living in the United States, where they once were distributed throughout the southwest. Before this sighting, it was believed that the species had been completely extirpated in the United States.

Historically, the jaguar was recorded in western and southern Texas, Louisiana, and Arizona and New Mexico (with earlier records describing sightings in what is now California and Colorado). However, since the 1940s, the jaguar has been limited to the southern parts of the two latter states. In 2010 the US Fish and Wildlife Service was successfully sued by Defenders of Wildlife and required to produce a Species Recovery Plan and designate critical habitat for jaguars. The US Fish and Wildlife Service has since drafted an area that includes the Santa Rita mountains as the critical habitat for the species' recovery in the United States.

The northernmost breeding population of jaguars, where El Jefe most likely originated, was identified by Brown and López González in eastern Sonora, Mexico, and named the Huásabas-Sahuaripa population, after two of the municipalities over which it extends. This population has been the target of several conservation efforts, most notably the creation of the Northern Jaguar Reserve, a private wildlife sanctuary first established in 2003 by Naturalia, a Mexican non-profit conservation organization and Northern Jaguar Project and since expanded from its original 4,000 hectares (40 square kilometers) to 24,400 hectares (244 square kilometers) in 2015.

As part of its efforts to determine critical habitat for the species and to understand how jaguars from this population have been reaching the United States, the US Fish and Wildlife Service commissioned the Wildlife Conservation Society to develop a connectivity model, that could inform which areas are likely to serve as wildlife corridors linking breeding populations of jaguars in Mexico to known locations of recent sightings in the United States. The report included a series of maps that identify the areas most likely to be used by jaguars along the western states of Mexico, and reaching into Arizona. It further identifies intersections between these corridors and major highways, as a first step in addressing the challenges any females may face trying to reach Arizona. The establishment of a breeding population of jaguars in the U.S. requires that at least one breeding female uses the U.S. as part of its territory, and is regarded as a milestone in species recovery.

== Development projects ==
The appearance of El Jefe in the Santa Rita Mountains prompted several groups to increase their opposition of the Rosemont Copper mining project still in the permitting process.

The housing project Villages at Vigneto is also being contested for its environmental impact, and damage to jaguar's critical habitat has been mentioned as one of the potential effects

The Mexico-United States barrier, a series of infrastructures built since 2006, most likely represent an obstacle to any female jaguar seeking to expand its territory into Arizona, from the known breeding populations of Sonora in Mexico. The increasing infrastructure and the waivers approved, releasing the Department of Homeland Security from adhering to any environmental law in its progress towards building more walls, have been cited as a major concern for recovery of the species in the United States.

Mexican Federal Highways No. 2 and No.15 have also been identified by both the Wildlife Conservation Society's report on jaguar habitat and by local conservation groups as major obstacles to jaguar recovery in the region. Beginning in 2010 Highway 2 has been undergoing a series of expansions, on the stretches from the town of Imuris in Sonora, to the town of Janos in the neighboring state of Chihuahua. Wildlands Network, a conservation group focused on preserving connectivity for large carnivores, has alerted of the need to include wildlife crossings on the expanded stretches of road to provide room to roam for jaguars and other animals.

== See also ==
- Big cat
  - Juma the jaguar
