= Alexander Bronstein =

Estonian-Jewish entrepreneur

- Бронштейн Александр Михайлович
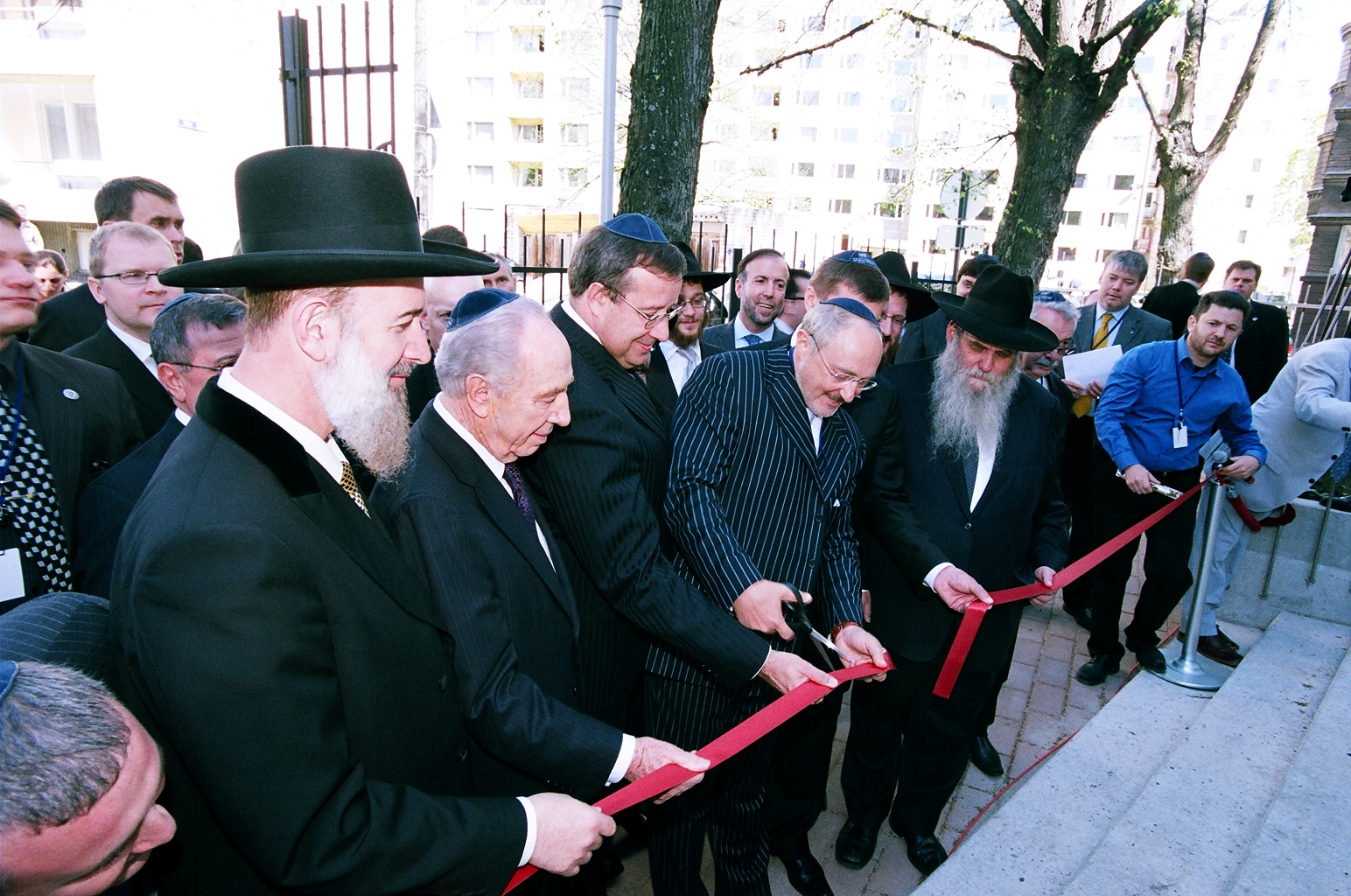
- Estonian Synagogue Grand Opening (Bronstein is in the center)
- Born: 15 June 1954 (age 72); Leningrad, USSR
- Occupation: Businessman

Alexander Bronstein (Russian: Бронштейн Александр Михайлович; born 15 June 1954, in Leningrad, USSR) is a businessperson. An Estonian citizen, he currently lives in Tallinn, Estonia. He heads the Solway Group, a controversial mining company.

== Biography ==
Alexander Bronstein was born in 1954 in Leningrad. He is son of academic and World War II veteran Mihhail Bronštein and Bela Barskaya. Antisemitism drove the family to Tallinn, Estonia in 1956. In 1976 Bronstein graduated from Tartu State University with a degree in Applied Mathematics, gaining a PhD in 1981. He started working in the nonferrous-metal industry in the late 1980s. He held a number of key posts within the metalworking business before becoming a co-founder of Solway Investment Group, managing assets in Central, Eastern Europe, South America and South-Eastern Asia. According to Finance magazine, Bronstein's net worth was US$150 million in 2007.

== Career ==
- 2009 – : "Solway Investment Group LTD", then "Solway Holding LTD", chairman of the board
- 2002–2008: Solway Management LLC, chairman of the board
- 2003–2007: "SUAL Holding Ltd.", chairman of the board
- 2002 – : Raznoimport Trading LTD (UK), CEO
- 1998–2000: Raznoimport LTD (UK), CEO in the Eastern Europe
- 1995–1997: Shanton International LTD, Director of the German representative office
- 1994–1995: Von Tsurikov Consulting (Germany), CFO
- 1991–1993: LTR Handels GmbH (Germany), CEO
- 1991 – : KTH Handels GmbH (Germany), CFO
- 1989-1980: Estland – West (joint German-Estonian venture), CEO
- 1997 – : leading positions at Flora-Moscow Bank, Volkhov Aluminium, Pikalevo Alumina, Siasky CBK, Volgograd Aluminium, JSC Metallurg, Klyuchevskiy ferroalloy plant.

== Public work ==
- 1975–1976: Ministry of Finance of Estonia – intern
- 1976—1988: Ministry of Forestry and Environment of Estonia – moved up from an intern position to become department chief
- 2002:Vice President of Eurasian Jewish Congress;
- 2007: Vice President of World Jewish Congress;
- 2012: President of EIPA's steering committee;
- 2013: President of IEPA: Israel Press Association (Belgium)
- Sponsoring a Keren Ha-Jesod charity foundation.

== Recognition ==
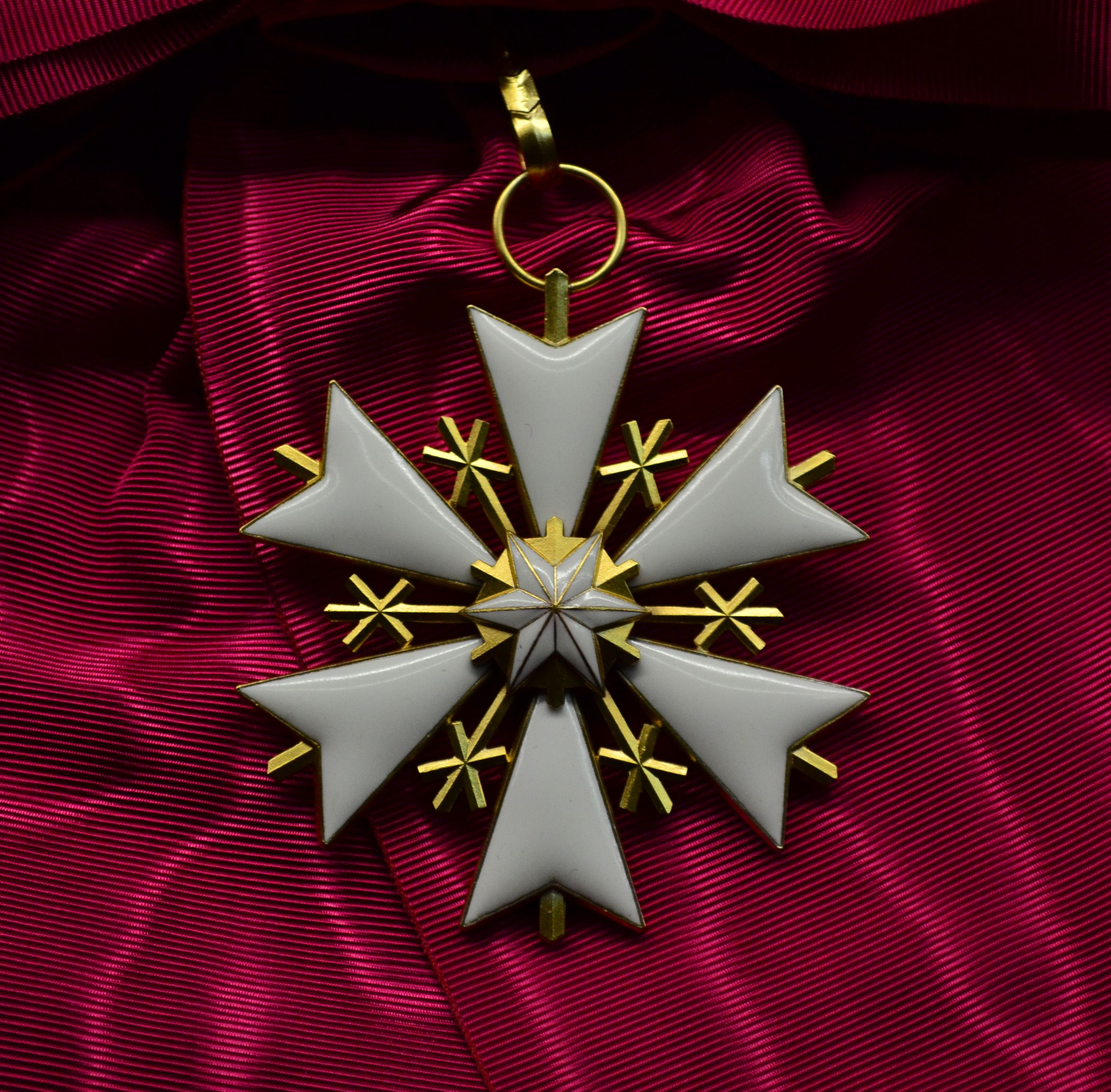
Order of the White Star 1st Class

2007: awarded an Order of the White Star by the Estonian government.

== Charity ==
Alexander Bronstein has played an active role in Jewish community life in Estonia since 2004. He funded the construction of the first Estonian synagogue and Jewish community centre (2005–07) to replace the building destroyed during World War II. The synagogue was named Beit Bela" in honour of Bronstein's mother. In 2006, Bronstein was one of the six sponsors who pledged support for Israeli orphans whose parents were killed by Hamas troops. He has supported the "Peres Centre" in Jaffa and the President's Conference in Jerusalem since 2008. In 2006 he organized and sponsored the European Israeli Friends forum, which brought together more than 500 members of the European Parliament in Jerusalem.

== Academic work ==
- "Ecologization of the economy: methods of regional management", Nauka Publishing House, 1990, Moscow
