= Prostitution in Guatemala =

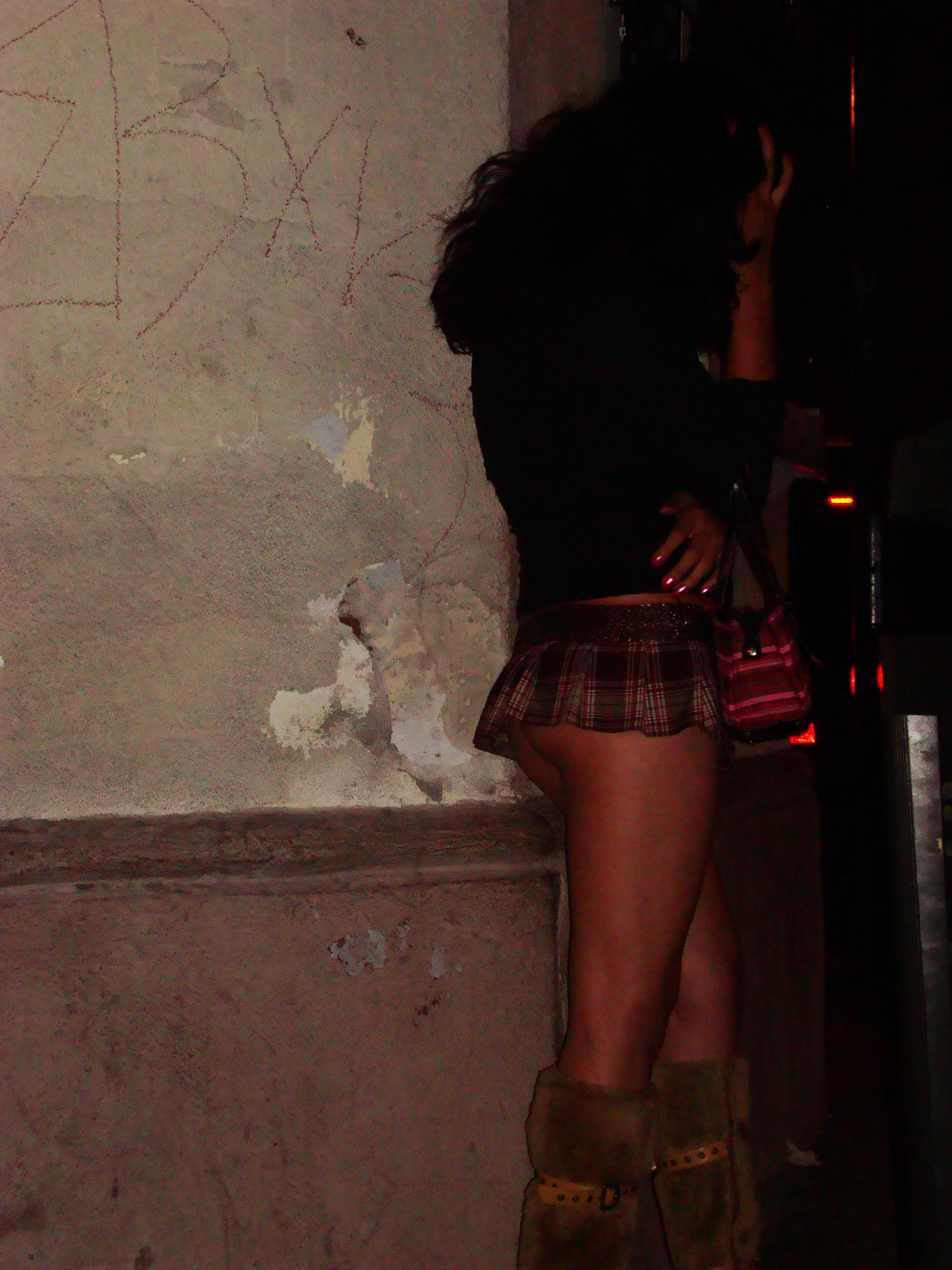
Prostitute on the street in Guatemala City

Prostitution in Guatemala is legal but procuring (pimping) is prohibited. There is an offence of "aggravated procuring" where a minor is involved. Keeping a brothel is not prohibited.

Prostitution is widespread in Guatemala; UNAIDS estimate there to be 26,000 prostitutes in the country. Guatemala City alone has 9 red-light districts, including La Linea, El Trebol and Parque Concordia. Statistics from the Vigilancia Centinela de las Infecciones de Transmisión Sexual (VICITS) sexual health clinics from 2007 to 2011 showed 10.8% of the sex workers worked on the streets, the rest working indoors at strip clubs, brothels based at residential homes, bars etc.

Child sex tourism is a problem in the country especially in areas such as Antigua and Guatemala City.

Human trafficking is also a significant and growing problem in the country, particularly the exploitation of children in prostitution. Many women and children are brought into the country from El Salvador, Nicaragua, and Honduras by organized rings that force them into prostitution.

== Colonial period ==
In colonial Guatemala, and into the 20th century, prostitution was thought of as necessary to protect the virtues of the "ladies" of Guatemala. Brothels and street prostitution were tolerated and commonplace. Guatemalan law held that prostitutes could not be raped and that violence was an occupational hazard.

Any woman, whether a prostitute or not, convicted of "bad conduct" could be incarcerated in a brothel for up to 3 years. Until outlawed in 1906, individual women and their sentences could be brought and sold between brothel madams.

== La Linea ==
In Guatemala City there is a red-light district by the "La Linea" railway track. About 250 prostitutes work there in shacks. The women rent the shacks directly from the owners and work for themselves, not pimps. They do have to pay protection money to local gangs. Generally the local police ignore the area.

The 'Oblate Sisters of the Most Holy Redeemer' provide outreach services to the women and run a drop-in center. The MuJER also provide outreach services to the women in La Linea and the other red-light districts of Guatemala City.

=== La Linea All-Stars ===
In 2004, some of the prostitutes formed a five-a-side football team to bring attention to the indignities and dangers of their lives. They joined a local league and their first match was against a high class private girls' school. During the game the parents found out how the team playing their daughters were and had the game stopped. Following this the team was expelled from the league.

As a result of the publicity surrounding the incident, a local travel company sponsored them to go on a tour of Guatemala, playing against other teams including other teams of prostitutes, such as the "Tigers of Desire", a team from a brothel in Flores. The tour attracted adverse publicity from moral conservatives and sponsorship was withdrawn.

Director Chema Rodríguez made a documentary film, Estrellas de La Línea, about the All Stars in 2006.

== HIV ==
With about 1 percent of the adult population estimated to be HIV-positive, Guatemala is considered to have a concentrated epidemic. In 2008, national HIV prevalence among sex workers is 4 percent, and among street-based female sex workers prevalence is as high as 12 percent. Following national and local awareness campaigns, education on sexual health and condom distribution, the HIV prevalence rate amongst sex workers dropped to 1.6% in 2016.

== Child prostitution ==
International tourists travel to Guatemala to engage in child sex tourism, especially in areas such as Antigua and Guatemala City.

Children from poor families fall victims to trafficking for purposes of prostitution through advertisements for lucrative foreign jobs or through personal recruitment. Street children are especially vulnerable to sexual exploitation.

The NGO End Child Prostitution, Child Pornography, and Trafficking of Children for Sexual Purposes (ECPAT) reported that children between the ages of 8 and 14 were sold for 750 to 1,500 quetzals ($97 to $194) to work in various economic activities, but primarily for sexual exploitation. According to ECPAT, the incidents of trafficking in persons and the sale of children for sexual exploitation have likely increased due to higher unemployment rates and increasing numbers of individuals living in extreme poverty.

Police, military, and elected officials have been placed under investigation for paying children for sex acts, facilitating child sex trafficking, or protecting venues where trafficking occurs.

== Sex trafficking ==
Guatemala is a source, transit, and destination country for women and children subjected to sex trafficking. Guatemalan women, girls, and boys are exploited in sex trafficking within the country and in Mexico, the United States, Belize, and other foreign countries. Commercial sexual exploitation of Guatemalan children by foreign tourists from Canada, the United States, and Western Europe, and by Guatemalan residents persists. Women and children from other Latin American countries and the United States are exploited in sex trafficking in Guatemala. Government studies of past cases suggest women recruited victims while men ran criminal organizations. Criminal organizations, including gangs, exploit girls in sex trafficking. Some Latin American migrants transiting Guatemala en route to Mexico and the United States are subjected to sex trafficking in Mexico, the United States, or Guatemala.

The United States Department of State Office to Monitor and Combat Trafficking in Persons ranks Guatemala as a Tier 2 Watch List' country.
