= Solway Group =

Private international mining and metals group

Solway Investment Group, GmbH
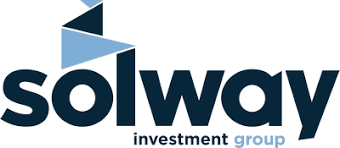
- Type: Company with Limited Liability
- Industry: Mining and metals
- Founder: Alexander Bronstein
- Headquarters: Switzerland
- Website: solwaygroup.com

The Solway Investment Group Limited, (The company is a legal successor of Solway Investment Fund since 2011) is a private international mining and metals group located in Switzerland. The Group conducts operations in North Macedonia, Ukraine, Indonesia and Guatemala.

The company has been accused of various misconducts, including environmental crimes in its operation in Guatemala. The information published resulted from a hacker attack on Solway. Subsidiaries have argued that accusations presented in the media are false and out of context.

The company was mentioned as involved in suspicious banking transactions In 2020 a related independent investigation published by Clifford Chance did not include Solway or any of the mentioned companies in their final report.

== Subsidiaries ==
- Solway Industries
- Solway Resource
- Solway Finance Ltd

== History ==
Solway is a family-owned mining and metals group headquartered in Switzerland. The company was founded by Aleksandr Bronstein, citizen of Estonia, born in 1954 in USSR Aleksandr Bronstein retired from all the positions in Solway in 2020 and ceased to own any interest in the company. The current owners of Solway are his sons, Dan and Christian Bronstein, both are German citizens.

The company was originally set up in Cyprus in 2011, and in 2015 moved to Switzerland, a well-known hub for the mining and commodity industry.

The group operates mines and smelting plants in Guatemala, Ukraine, North Macedonia, Argentina, and Indonesia, with a focus on nickel production. It has been active in the nickel business since 2003 when Solway acquired a distressed asset in Ukraine, invested in the reconstruction and started the production of ferro-nickel. This asset is known today as “Pobuzhsky Ferronickel Plant” (“PFP”) and it remained operative despite the war until October 2022. On October 22, 2022, because of a missile strike by the Russian army, the power substation was destroyed and, accordingly, the power supply to the PFP was completely cut off. Although production was stopped completely, the group continues financially supporting local residents and social infrastructure of Pobuzhsky town. On May 20, 2026, Solway Investment Group announced the sale of Pobuzhsky Ferronickel Plant (PFK) following a strategic review of the enterprise’s operations. The company stated that it had continued to support the plant and its employees during a challenging period. The terms of the transaction and the identity of the buyer were not disclosed due to confidentiality obligations.

Before Solway Fund was established in 2002, several transactions were made by the shareholders, which preceded the history of the company's inception.

Aluminum: In the mid-90s acquired controlling interests in several aluminum plants, the Volgograd Aluminum Plant, the Volkhov Aluminum Plant, and the Pikalevo Alumina Plant. These were sold in 2006 to SUAL, now part of Rusal.

Ferroalloy: In 1996 a controlling interest was acquired in the Kluchevskoy Ferroalloys Plant in the Ural region. The plant produced a wide range of ferroalloys and rare earth alloys. Solway's interest was sold to a manager group in 2003. It is now part of MidUral Group.

Steel: The Red October Steel Plant in Volgograd was acquired in 1999 from creditors in bankruptcy. The plant was restarted and full production restored. It was sold in 2003 to Midland Group. It is now a part of Rosoboronexport, a state-owned firm.

== Key milestones of Solway Group ==
In 2003 the first acquisition was made: the Pobuzhskiy Ferronickel Plant (PFP) in Ukraine. The plant was built in 1964 in the Soviet Union. It had been idle for 3 years when Solway acquired it. In 2014 an attempt at a hostile takeover of PFP took place. Solway became object of the investigation by the Ukrainian intelligence, the result showed the absence of any links to Russian government or any Russian PEPs. The takeover attempt remains unsuccessful.

In the same 2003, the acquisition of Metachim (Chemical plant in Russia) took place. In 2011, Metachim becomes an object of a hostile takeover by the Phosagro Group (backed by the vice-minister of economy of Russia). Solway was forced to sell Metachim for a fraction of its value.

In 2004 Solway acquired Bucim (a copper mine and refinery in North Macedonia).

In 2005 Solway acquired SASA (zinc and lead mine and refinery in North Macedonia). The asset was purchased as insolvent (during a bankruptcy procedure). SASA project was sold in 2015 and by this time investments in SASA were 10,9 mln EURO.

In 2006: acquisition of the exploration license in Kuril Islands, Russia. The exploration resulted in the construction of the KurilGeo gold mine. In 2014, gold production started in KurilGeo.

In 2007 Solway acquired its first licenses in Indonesia and followed by other licenses in 2012.

In 2011: acquisition of Fenix project, a nickel project in Guatemala which was purchased from Hudbay for $170 million. The operation had been on care and maintenance since 1980. In June 2014, the production in Guatemala started and in 2019 it reached planned capacity.

In 2015: acquisition of San-Jorge Copper project in Argentina from TSX listed Coro Mining.

In 2019: acquisition of ZGRK project There were gold-containing dumps remaining after gold mine activity in the 1930-s in the Baikal region of Russia therefore the project provided for the recycling of the dumps, the extraction of the remaining gold and further recultivation.

In 2021 the company sold Maba nickel project in Indonesia which required the construction of extensive infrastructure, including its own coal-fired power plant.

In the same year, 2021, the company invested in nickel projects in US, Nevada Copper and Talon Metals Corp through Pallinghurst, an exploration nickel project (Tamarack) in Minnesota.

In 2022, after the beginning of the invasion of Ukraine Solway publicly condemned Russian aggression and decided to exit from all the operations and investment project in Russia. As a result, both KurilGeo, and ZGRK are sold as a package deal (KurilGeo for nominal consideration due to the approaching end of the life of the mine and ZGRK for a consideration of less than 75% of the total investment spent on the acquisition and construction of the mine up to the exit).

== Current properties and investments ==
The Fenix nickel project is a nickel resource in Guatemala which was purchased from Hudbay in 2011 for $170 million. The operation had been on care and maintenance since 1980. Since 2011, Solway has invested almost US $620 million into the Fenix Project. Today, the Fenix Project consists of a world-class nickel mine, a newly built power plant and the ProNiCo metal processing facility. The project has mining rights to 36.2 million tons of nickel ore reserves with 1.86% nickel, as well as the rights to an additional 70.0 million tons of resources within its license area. In 2014, the ProNiCo plant began operating, and is currently moving towards operating at its production capacity of over 20 kt of Ni pa.

Due to OFAC sanctions, CGN and Pronico have faced difficulties and have had to stop their activity.

Pobuzhskiy Ferronickel Plant (PFP) in Ukraine. The plant was built in 1964 in the Soviet Union. It had been idle for 3 years when Solway acquired it in 2003. The facility was converted to focus on the production of a single commodity: ferronickel produced from laterite nickel ores imported from Indonesia and New Caledonia, and later, from Solway’s project in Guatemala.Since 2003, Solway has invested over US $200 million into modernizing PFP. The plant currently has an annual production capacity of over 22,000 metric tons of Ni and over 1,100 thousand metric tons of dry laterite ore. The Pobuzhskiy Ferronickel Plant. is a member of the Kyiv Chamber of Commerce and Industry.

In November 2022 the management of the Pobuzhsky ferronickel plant announced a forced stoppage of work. The enterprise is not able to restart the furnaces now due to Russian attacks on the Ukrainian energy system.

DOO Bucim in North Macedonia. Solway acquired the bankrupted Bucim mine in 2005 when it won the Macedonian government’s international tender. Since 2005, Solway Investment Group has invested over US $50 million in the Buchim mine. Today, Bucim is an open pit mine which produces premium flotation concentrate containing copper and gold, and a SX/EW operation producing LME-grade cathode copper. Buchim processes over 4.5 million tons of ore annually. Over 40,000 tons of copper concentrate containing gold are produced each year. Within the Buchim project, Solway is developing the Borov Dol mine which will extend the life of the Buchim operation to at least 2028. An estimated US $56 million of total capital expenditures will be dedicated to the Borov Dol project.

Aquila nickel project, 2005, Indonesia. Aquila Nickel is a greenfield nickel and cobalt project focused on the construction of a large, top-tier nickel producer in Indonesia. The resource base consists of Maba, a world-class, large Ni-Co deposit located on Halmahera Island. Currently, the project is estimated to have resources of over 120 million tons of dry saprolite ore, with an average nickel grade of 1.58%, as well as over 80 million tons of dry limonite ore, with a nickel grade of 1.15% and a cobalt grade of 0.15%. In 2017, the group obtained all the necessary permits required to proceed to the next stage of the project, including the main mining license.

Kurilgeo, Urup Island Russia. Solway owned and operated a gold mining project on Urup Island, one of the Kuril Islands, in Russia’s Far East. In June 2022, Solway sold project to Armenian company Far East Gold after they reported that "despite the limited investment and operating activities in Russia, it is exiting all its projects in Russia’ in response to Russian special operation in Ukraine.

Investment in Coro Mining Corp in May 2011 San Jorge Copper project in Mendoza Province. Argentina. Today the Group acquired a 100% ownership of the project.

In 2021, investments into the copper development project in US: Nevada Copper Corp.'s (TSE:NCU) and Talon Metals Corp in Minnesota through Pallinghurst Resources Ltd.

== Criticism ==
The company is accused of bribery, corruption and environmental crimes, based on secret internal documents sent to the journalistic association Forbidden Stories led by the French journalist and founder Laurent Richard.

In response to the allegations, the company launched an investigation in December 2022. The first results were published in May 2023.

The investigation was led by experienced and respectable investigators retired from the United States government. The independently conducted investigation demonstrated that it is not Russian owned, controlled, connected, or influenced.

Solway has strong links here with the Guatemala-based company Pronico, whose mine has caused an environmental disaster with emissions of high levels of nickel in Guatemala's largest lake.

An independent study by the University of San Carlos of Guatemala (Usac) concluded that the red color of the water in the lake was a product of pollution, but due to organic and chemical waste in the Polochic river, one of the largest in Guatemala. The finding was supported by the Ministry of the Environment.

According to the Minister of the Environment , Sydney Samuels, among the polluting agents of the lake there are the surrounding communities and the sewage of the Polochic River, as it flows into Lake Izabal.

Unicellular algae feed on waste and each other, which is why they are growing excessively, says the official.

He also indicated that it is that same process that began in Lake Amatitlán and no one knew how to treat it.

Solway was also accused of removing filter of the chimneys at night, which the locals thought was the cause of the red smoke from the factory chimneys. Solway said that excessive concentrations of fine particles in communities are associated with unrelated to the plant sources of dust: road dust and waste incineration in fields. CGN’s manager added that monitoring is carried out constantly, for not only water but also dust and noise.

A documentary was also made in March 2022 for SVT (Swedish Television) where the leaked documents revealed the scandal It is the result of a large investigation "Mining Secrets" to which 65 journalists from 15 countries participated, including journalists from El País (Spain), Le Monde (France) and Prensa Comunitaria (Guatemala), which also uncovered evidence of spying on journalists, and manipulation and intimidation of indigenous leaders.

== OFAC Sanctions to subsidiaries ==
In November 2022, the U.S. Department of the Treasury’s Office of Foreign Assets Control (OFAC) sanctioned Compania Guatemalteca de Niquel (CGN), Compania Procesadora de Niquel (ProNiCo), two subsidiaries of solway group.

According to independent investigators, OFAC in its statement, refers to incorrect allegation, stating that Solway is a Russian company. and Although there were connections between Solway, its founder, and Russian business entities and individuals, the investigation shows there is no evidence that Solway, its founder, or its shareholders were historically, or are currently, controlled or influenced by Russian entities and/or individuals in any way. No evidence has been found to date of any direct, indirect, hidden, beneficial or informal Russian private corporate, governmental entity or individual ownership interest in, or indicia of control over, Solway, CGN, or Pronico or any of its shareholders or executives.

A Newsweek investigation suggested that the US government is trying to capitalize on the Treasury sanctions to secure access to Solway’s mining assets in Guatemala amid intense competition with China over strategic resources.

After a comprehensive review, OFAC has given SIG the green light to relaunch the activities of its subsidiaries in Guatemala.
