= Fenix Nickel Project =

Nickel mine and processing facility in Izabal Department, Guatemala

Fenix Nickel Project Eximbal Mine; El Estor Mine
- Location within Guatemala
- Interactive map of Fenix Nickel Project; Eximbal Mine; El Estor Mine
- Location: El Estor, Izabal Department, Guatemala; 15°31′34″N 89°23′23″W
- Products: Nickel

The Fenix nickel project, also known as El Estor mine, is an integrated mountain-top nickel mine and processing facility near El Estor in the Izabal Department of eastern Guatemala, situated on the ancestral lands of the Maya Q'eqchi' people. The project consists of a cluster of several deposits with reserves amounting to 36.1 million tonnes of ore grading 1.86% nickel. The project is currently owned by Solway Group, a Switzerland-headquartered company with Russian ownership, through its Guatemalan subsidiaries CGN (formerly Eximbal) and Pronico.

The mine has contributed to over six decades of documented conflict, dispossession, and violence against Maya Q'eqchi' communities. Initial mining rights were granted following the US-backed 1954 Guatemalan coup d'état, without the free, prior, and informed consent of Indigenous peoples. During the ensuing Guatemalan civil war, Eximbal mine security was implicated in violence against Mayan people in 1978. Canadian mining companies Inco, and later Skye Resources and Hudbay Minerals, failed to obtain consent from or acknowledge the land claims of Maya Q'eqchi' communities throughout their periods of operation. In 2006, the International Labour Organization ruled that Guatemala had violated international law by granting the Fenix concession without first consulting local Indigenous peoples.

In late 2006 and early 2007, Skye Resources, operating through its Guatemalan subsidiary CGN, sought the forced eviction of five Q'eqchi' communities on contested mine land, including families holding hereditary and ancestral land claims. Police arrived without a court-ordered eviction notice as required by Guatemalan law, and homes were burned to the ground during these operations. During the January 17, 2007 eviction of Lote Ocho, eleven Q'eqchi' women were gang raped by police, soldiers, and CGN security personnel. On September 27, 2009, mine security forces shot and killed prominent Q'eqchi' teacher and community leader Adolfo Ich Chamán, shot and paralyzed activist German Chub. These incidents gave rise to three landmark lawsuits filed in Canada: Caal v. Hudbay, Choc v. Hudbay, and Chub v. Hudbay, for violence against Q'eqchi' land defenders. In 2011, amid this litigation, Hudbay sold the Fenix project to the Solway Group for $170 million.

A 2019 media investigation coordinated by French NGO Forbidden Stories found evidence in leaked documents that the mining company covered up pollution events, bribed community leaders to support the mine, and made payments to police and the military.

== Background ==
The Fenix project encompasses 250,000 square kilometers near the town of El Estor and adjacent to Guatemala's largest freshwater lake: Lake Izabal. The lake is an important breeding ground for endangered manatees. Local people rely on fish from the lake. The project area also includes protected areas and habitat for the endangered Yucatan black howler monkey.

The project and includes about 20 Mayan villages, some of which have complained about water shortages and crop failures.

Nickel from the mine is primarily exported to China or Europe to manufacture stainless steel.

Initial mining rights in the area were granted by military leaders following the US-backed 1954 Guatemalan coup d'état. During the ensuing Guatemalan civil war, many Mayan people were massacred, and EXIMBAL mine security participated in this violence in 1978.

== Ownership and production history ==
The Fenix nickel resource was first developed in 1960 by the Canadian mining company Inco. The mine was explored by Guatemalan subsidiary Eximbal, and in 1965 the Guatemalan government granted the firm a 40-year lease to operate an open pit mine on 385 square kilometers.

From 1977 to 1980, the mine produced about 604,000 tonnes of saprolite ore annually, grading 2.12% nickel and yielded almost 15,000 tonnes of nickel. The operation was closed and placed on care and maintenance from 1980 to 2004.

Skye Resources, a Vancouver firm, purchased the project from Inco in 2004 but was acquired by Hudbay Minerals in 2008. At this time, the Eximbal subsidiary's name was changed to Compañía Guatemalteca de Niquel (CGN), which was 98.2% owned by Hudbay Minerals from August 2008 to September 2011, when it was sold for $170 million to the Russian owned Solway Group. Solway is now headquartered in Switzerland.

After being dormant for decades, the project was reopened by Solway in 2014.

Solway subsidiary CGN does the mining, while the subsidiary Pronico operates the refinery.

== Resources and facilities ==
The Fenix Project in eastern Guatemala is a substantial brownfield nickel laterite mine and process plant.

In 2019 the Fenix mining concession covered 250,000 sq km.

== Lawsuits and violent conduct ==
The project has resulted in multiple lawsuits and instances of violence against the local community. Local Maya-Q’eqchi’ communities were found to have been insufficiently consulted about the project, have suffered from consequent threats to their water and livelihoods, and do not receive development benefits from the project. Despite this, the company claims that it follows all environmental laws, has invested in the community, and boasts of providing 1,900 jobs and additional contracted positions. CGN insists that the pollution in Lake Izabal was caused by sewage and agriculture, despite evidence to the contrary.

Residents in local communities also report attacks by mine security. The police and Guatemalan military have violently suppressed protests against the mining, brutalizing and killing protesters.

=== Evictions and land claims (2006–2007) ===
In late 2006 and early 2007, Skye Resources, operating through its Guatemalan subsidiary CGN, applied for the forced eviction of five Maya Q'eqchi' communities located on contested mine land in the municipality of El Estor. Community members living on the disputed land stated that several residents held deeds to certain parcels, while others were staking hereditary and ancestral claims to the territory. CGN and Skye Resources characterized the long-established communities as "invaders," a characterization later challenged in Canadian court proceedings.

The evictions took place in three waves on January 8, 9, and 17, 2007. On November 12, 2006, police had already arrived in the communities of Chupon and La Revolución at 3:00am without an eviction order signed by a judge, as required by Guatemalan law, and without the presence of the Public Prosecutor, and proceeded to violently expel families, causing injuries to several people. Internal emails filed in Canadian court proceedings show that CGN management coordinated with Guatemala's national police and military to carry out the evictions, and that pressure was applied to a local judge to obtain the eviction order. Homes were burned to the ground during these operations. During the final eviction of Lote Ocho on January 17, 2007, eleven Q'eqchi' women were gang raped by police officers, soldiers, and CGN security personnel. Five of the women were pregnant at the time; four subsequently miscarried. Hudbay Minerals, which acquired Skye in 2008 and thereby inherited its legal liabilities, has disputed the women's accounts in court filings, claiming that no security personnel were present during the January 17 eviction.

In June 2013, the Ontario Superior Court of Justice ruled that Hudbay could be held legally responsible in Canada for crimes committed by its Guatemalan subsidiary, including the alleged gang rape of the eleven women from Lote Ocho. This was the first time a claim against a Canadian mining company for human rights abuses abroad had been permitted to proceed to trial in Canada.

=== 2009 attacks and 2012 lawsuit ===
In 2012, Angelica Choc of the Maya Q’eqchi’ community, alongside 12 other plaintiffs, filed a lawsuit in Canada against HudBay Minerals and two of its subsidiaries over the killing of her husband, Adolfo Ich Chamán, a prominent Maya Q’eqchi’ community leader. Through this lawsuit, Angelica Choc and the other plaintiffs sought to hold HudBay, the Canadian corporation, liable for the violence inflicted upon the community by security personnel employed by the Guatemalan subsidiary. The lawsuit alleges that on September 27, 2009, the Fenix Head of Security, Mynor Padilla, shot and killed Adolfo Ich Chamán within just weeks of his involvement in a meeting advocating for the community’s land rights. Two other cases between the community and Hudbay were also heard: Chub v. Hudbay Minerals et al, in which German Choc Chub, a youth, pursued justice for becoming paraplegic from being shot by Mynor Padilla the same day, and Caal et al v. HudBay Minerals et al, in which Mayan women requested compensation for having faced violent evictions and gang-rape by security officers, police, and military.

A warrant was issued for the arrest of the head of mine security, Mynor Ronaldo Padilla Gonzáles in 2009, although he remained a fugitive and stayed on the company's payroll for several more years until his termination was finally terminated in 2017. He pleaded guilty to the homicide of Chamán and the injury of Chub, among other charges of aggravated assault, in 2021. Director of Rights Action, a Canadian non-governmental organization that had worked with community leaders including Chamán, described the murder as the “targeted killing of a well-known community leader.” Amnesty International has affirmed the severity of the murder allegations and called for a “swift, full and impartial investigation into the death of Adolfo Ich Chamán and other incidents of violence, to make the results public and to bring those responsible to justice.”

In a news release regarding the violent incidents, HudBay referred to the Maya-Q’eqchi’ people on Area 217 as “illegal occupiers,” denied the intentions to evict communities, described the negotiations as “consistent with HudBay's strategy of peacefully resolving illegal occupations through dialogue,” and insisted that CGN security “acted only in self defense.”

HudBay states that it and CGN have cooperated fully with all investigations conducted by Guatemalan authorities in connection with the incidents which occurred on September 27, 2009 in El Estor. According to CGN's internal investigation, none of its employees or security personnel were involved in the death of Chamán.

In June 2013, the Ontario Superior Court of Justice ruled that the Canadian company could be held legally responsible for crimes committed in Guatemala, including the alleged murder of Adolfo Ich Chamán and the alleged sexual assault of 11 women from Lote Ocho. A jury notice was filed in December 2013.

=== Evictions and land claims ===
In late 2006 and early 2007, Skye Resources (acquired by HudBay Minerals in 2008, renamed HMI Nickel and subsequently sold by HudBay in 2011) carried out forced evictions of Mayan communities located on contested mine land. During a number of these evictions, police officers and soldiers burnt the homes of Mayan communities to the ground.

The Fenix mining project is also subject to ongoing land claims by local Mayan communities. In 2006, the International Labour Organization, an agency of the United Nations, ruled that Guatemala had breached international law by granting the Fenix mining concession without first consulting with the local Mayan communities. The ILO released a report discussing the violation in 2007.

In February 2022, the Inter-American Court of Human Rights heard a land-claims case from Mayan communities impacted by the mine. The case is part of a years-long claim beginning in 2002, when residents of the area bought their land back from the Guatemalan government, but never received title.

=== Lake Izabal pollution ===
Lake Izabal, the largest freshwater lake in Guatemala, at 672 km^{2}, has experienced significant environmental degradation following the expansion of industrial mining at the Fenix Nickel mine by Canadian actors. The lake is an important cultural and ecological site for the Q'eqchi people of the nearby town, El Estor, as the lake supports subsistence agriculture and fishing for local communities.

When Guatemala sold the mining rights of the area to international mining corporations in 1860, the lake began to undergo significant ecological change. Pollution related to mining activity resulted in unusual concentrations of metals, particularly lead and zinc. These contaminants have greatly impacted marine organisms in the lake, as this pollution manifests in the form of ailments for these animals, with many members of the guild reporting “deformed fish [from pollution].”

Lead and Zinc are not highly toxic chemicals naturally to ecosystems; however, the accumulation of these metals as a byproduct of mining in Lake Izabal has serious consequences for those who rely on it, with pregnant women and children facing the most devastating impacts. This has raised serious concerns amongst local populations, as environmental contamination is a threat to current populations, but also to future generations of Indigenous communities.

The gradual nature of this contamination can be described as a form of “slow violence”, as its incremental impacts accumulate over time. Due to the slow nature of this harm, the delayed detection of health impacts can limit the potential for oppositional action. However, despite little attention to the impacts of this slow violence in the region, large-scale pollution events have brought more immediate concern about the harm of pollution, as seen in May 2017, when the water of Lake Izabal turned red for weeks. Attention was drawn to the issue, which, in this case, led local fishermen to begin protesting the mine. At least one protester was shot and killed during these protests.

In 2018, the community then formed the Guild of Artisanal Fishermen of El Estor, who then officially filed for legal action against the Guatemalan government and its subsidiary CGN.

=== Forbidden stories investigation ===
In May 2019, A Guatemalan court found that the Ministry of Energy and Mines (MEM) had failed to ensure the local Maya-Q’eqchi peoples' free, prior and informed consent for the project, and that the mine had been operating since 2005 without local consent, which is required by international labor law. This resulted in the court ordering the suspension of operations at the mine.

Following this ruling, a media investigation involving several outlets, coordinated by the French consortium Forbidden Stories, found evidence of a smear campaign and suspicious economic payments that may have undermined the consultation process following the 2019 court ruling.

Throughout this investigation, teams examined millions of leaked internal documents belonging to mining company Solway's Guatemalan subsidiary and found that several pollution events were not reported, some of which would have led to criminal prosecution. Researchers found that there was a negative relationship between the mine and troubles related to failed crops and water pollution, as many individuals reported catching polluted fish in Lake Izabal, alluding to significant environmental degradation. The investigation also found evidence of "troubling methods to exert influence over local politics and repress dissent," including tens of thousands of dollars budgeted for bribery of community leaders. Local leaders report attempts at bribery and threats of violence for noncooperation with attempts to access nickel deposits under their towns.

The company and the government both denied wrongdoing and questioned the authenticity of the documents, instead attributing the cause of pollution to laboratory testing, but have not provided any evidence to support these claims, ultimately indicating that their action at the Fenix Nickel Mine is responsible for environmental degradation in the community of El Estor.

Despite this, this ruling barring mining activity was later overturned by the MEM, resulting in a confusing decision that has set the conditions for further harm within the community of El Estor.

=== 2021 protests ===
In October 2021, protesters objecting to the allegedly rigged consultation blockaded the mine and the processing plant. After three weeks of blockades, on October 24, a confrontation where four police officers were wounded resulted in the government making an emergency declaration that restricted personal freedoms, imposed curfews, and deployed 1000 soldiers to El Estor (a community of 10,000). The soldiers arrested more than 60 protesters and raided over 40 homes.

== See also ==
- Mineral industry of Guatemala
