= Guatemala and the World Bank =

The World Bank, in seeking to promote development within less developed countries, describes itself as a fund rather than a Bank, by initiating projects for less developed countries in pursuit to end poverty. The World Bank initiates and divides such projects for each Developed country through its 5 internal Institutions: that being MIGA, IDA, IFC, ICSID, and IRD. One target Latin American country was Guatemala. According to recent World Bank data, 8.7% of Guatemala's people met the standard of extreme poverty. This standard is quantified to mean an average income of less than $1.9 (US $) a day. Such poverty thus increasingly grew by "half a million" from the time of 2000–2014 With increasingly high poverty and a lack thereof appropriate education in 2016 prompted the World Bank partnership with Guatemala through the partnership.

== IBRD ==
First Programmatic Improved Governance of Public Resources and Nutrition Development Policy Financing

Here the World Bank institution, the IBRD designed and began the First Programmatic Improved Governance of Public Resources and Nutrition Development Policy Financing This project sought to address malnutrition, and delineate better accounting methods for the nation's public resources. Ultimately the IBRD does not supplement national income for free. The IBRD, in this case, lends to low-income countries that meet WB lending standards. Recently such a project reached its closing date in September 2019. Overall implementation met "satisfactory" standards.

Crecer Sano: Guatemala Nutrition and Health Project

Such a project was further expanded in 2017 and was called the Crecer Sano: Guatemala Nutrition and Health Project. With a target of malnutrition specifically, this fund and project seek to educate on ways to improve prenatal care, access to clean water, and finance consultants for MIDES-FODES operations. Currently, there was data indicating that 43% of individuals followed such prenatal care by breastfeeding children for 6 months. However, 0 of the targeted areas have been assisted with the lean water sanitation projects or ideas thus far.

Second Disaster Risk Management Development Policy Loan

Since 2016, the IBRD has partenered with the Guatemalan economy, people, and government to implement a great variety of projects. Most Recently being the Second Disaster Risk Management Development Policy Loan. Such a project is expected to close by 2023 and is estimated to cost around QTQ200,000,000. This multi-year project aims at ensuring the reactionary actions by the country to respond to potential environmental disasters. Ranking as the 11th most at-risk country for natural disasters combined with the effects of El Nino in Latin American Countries provided an incentive for the World Bank to partner with the Government of Guatemala to lend funds for such a project. Being such a newer project success of recently initiated and assigned, this project will be reflected within the following years.

== MIGA ==
Distribuidoras Electricas de Oriente y Occidente

With goals to stimulate economic growth and reduce poverty MIGA signed a partnership with Guatemala in order to facilitate a new project called... This project will require the acquirement of 85% of assets in 2 companies. The overarching goal is to revamp Guatemala's electrification program. The idea is with the investment the end of shortages and blackouts can be prevented.
