= Guatemala and the International Monetary Fund =

Guatemala and the International Monetary Fund are the international relations between Guatemala and the International Monetary Fund (IMF). Guatemala became a member country of the International Monetary Fund on December 28, 1945. Guatemala holds a quota of 428.6 million Special Drawing Rights (SDR) and 5,751 votes. Since its membership, Guatemala has had 15 arrangements. Dubbed as "Central America's largest economy," Guatemala has seen a 3.4% Gross Domestic Product (GDP.) and a 4.2% change in consumer price.

== IMF goals ==
Some of the International Monetary Fund's goals in Guatemala are to restore investor confidence in the country, help the country become profitable, add environmental reforms, and expand the workforce. One of the Fund's main goal for the country is to raise the standard of living. The International Monetary Fund plans on achieving their goal by providing primary health care to low income families and improve sanitation conditions. Moreover, the International Monetary Fund plans to encourage government spending by 15% of their GDP and increase social and infrastructural spending. Poverty reduction is also a huge part of the IMF's agenda. The Fund intends on implementing tax reforms, mobilize revenue, and strengthening tax administration as a measure to reduce poverty in the country.

== IMF action plan ==
Guatemala has had a decrease in their unemployment rate. In 2018, it was reported that the unemployment rate was 2.73%. Though the unemployment rate may seem low, most of the employment is informal. About 70% of the work in Guatemala is informal. As a result, the International Monetary Fund has encouraged the Guatemalan government to implement programs to expand the formal workforce, like Mi Primer Empleo. Some of the programs help potential worker by training them in the formal sector. Another course of action the Fund plans on addressing is suspending all mining activities and provide access to clean water in the developing areas of the country. As of now, the IMF is pending bills in hope to improve the Guatemalan financial system.

== Remittances in Guatemala ==
Guatemala relies heavily on remittances. In the past few years, the Guatemalan economy has seen a positive trend in its GDP. Remittances are essential to the Guatemalan economy. In 2017, it was reported that remittances accounted a total of at least 11% of the country's GDP. Remittances that enter the Guatemalan country mostly come from the United States. Behind Mexico, Guatemala is the second Latin American country to receives the high remittances. Aside from the 11% of GDP remittance account for, remittances are also responsible for 46% of household income. This source of foreign income outpaces the country's exports and foreign direct investment, making it the second largest foreign income to enter the country.

== The influence remittance ==
Education in Guatemala has been steadily growing. Remittances have been an active player in the growth of education because it gives many low income families the extra financial boost to afford it. Remittances reduce the need for child workers and allows them to pursue a form of education, whether it be vocational or post secondary education. Another influence remittances are responsible for is the increase of stable capital flow. Remittances that enter the country are resilient but, most of remittances go unrecorded. About 50% of remittances that enter the country is unreported.
