= Uspantán mine =

Nickel mine in Guatemala

- Location within Guatemala Location within Central America
- Interactive map of Uspantán mine
- Location: Uspantán, Quiché Department, Guatemala; 15°22′59″N 90°49′59″W
- Products: Nickel

The Uspantán mine is one of the largest nickel mines in Guatemala. The mine is located in Uspantán in Quiché Department. The mine has reserves amounting to 40 million tonnes of ore grading 1.25% nickel.
