= Canibal mine =

Titanium mine in Culico, Guatemala

Location
- Location: Cuilco, Huehuetenango Department, Guatemala

Production
- Products: Titanium

The Canibal mine is one of the largest titanium mines in Guatemala. The mine is located in Cuilco in Huehuetenango Department. The mine has reserves amounting to 50 million tonnes of ore grading 19.43% titanium.
