= Hudbay =

Canadian mining company

Hudbay Minerals Inc.
- Type: Public
- Traded as: TSX: HBM; NYSE: HBM
- Industry: Mining
- Founded: 1996; 30 years ago (as Pan American Resources Inc.); 1927; 99 years ago (as Hudson Bay Mining and Smelting Co., Limited)
- Headquarters: Toronto, Ontario, Canada
- Key people: Peter Kukielski, President & CEO; Eugene Lei, CFO
- Products: Copper, gold, silver, zinc, molybdenum
- Revenue: ▲US$2.021 billion (2024)
- Operating income: ▲US$400 million (2024)
- Net income: ▲US$76 million (2024)
- Total assets: ▲US$5.487 billion (2024)
- Total equity: ▲US$2.553 billion (2024)
- Number of employees: 94 in Toronto, 895 in Manitoba, 681 in British Columbia, 1,077 in Peru, and 56 in the United States (2024)
- Website: www.hudbayminerals.com

Hudbay Minerals Inc. is a Canadian mining company that produces copper, gold, silver, zinc, and molybdenum. In 2024, the company produced 137,943 tonnes of copper, 332,240 ounces of gold, 3,983,851 ounces of silver, 33,339 tonnes of zinc, and 1,323 tonnes of molybdenum. In 2024, copper sales represented 57% of revenue, gold sales represented 33% of revenue, and zinc sales represented 4% of revenue.

The company's major producing operations are the Constancia mine in Cusco, Peru; the Snow Lake operations in Snow Lake, Manitoba, Canada; and the Copper Mountain mine in British Columbia, Canada. The Company’s pipeline includes the Copper World project in Arizona, United States; the Mason project in Nevada, United States, and the Llaguen project in La Libertad, Peru. It also owns Rosemont Copper, a proposed large open pit copper mine project, which currently cannot be legally developed as it faces opposition from environmental groups on issues related to waste disposal, pollution, water contamination, and habitat destruction.

== History ==
=== Hudson Bay Mining and Smelting Co. ===
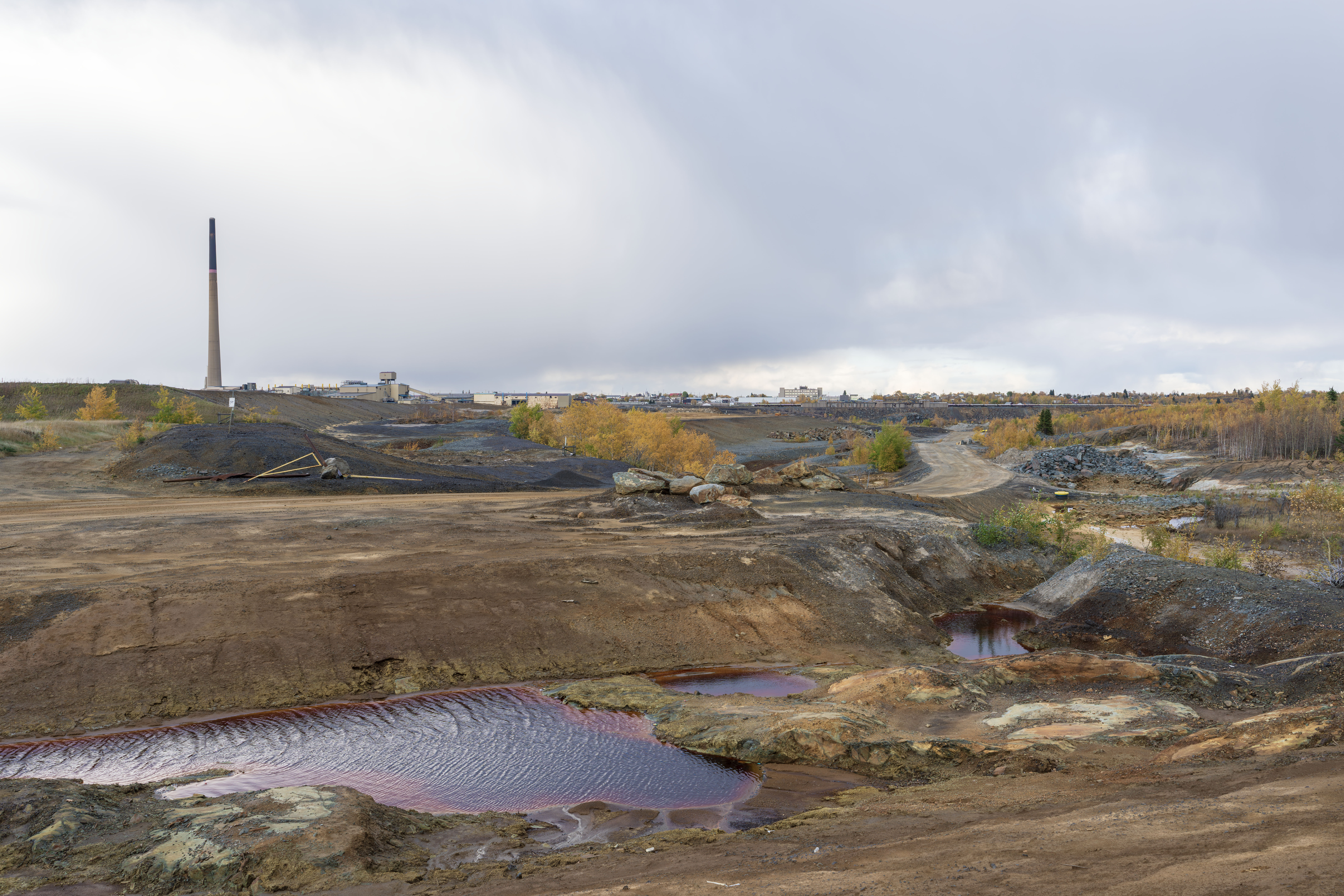
Hudbay's original Flin Flon mine

The Flin Flon greenstone belt was discovered by David Collins, a local trapper, and shown to prospector Tom Creighton in 1915. It was named after Josiah Flintabbatey Flonatin, a character in The Sunless City. The first claim was registered in 1915.

In 1925, after unsuccessful attempts to develop the mine, Cornelius Vanderbilt Whitney (a member of the Whitney family of New York), along with Newmont Mining and Mining Corp of Canada, founded Hudson Bay Mining & Smelting (HBM&S), which acquired the Flin Flon property. The huge, high grade ore body required large amounts of hydro energy, was isolated, and copper production required a smelter, leading to delays in production. In June 1930, the mine, smelter, hydroelectric dam and railroad finally went into operation. In 1938, the company was listed on the New York Stock Exchange. The company supplied the United States with metals during World War II. In 1958, Hudbay opened its first mine in Snow Lake, 215 kilometres east of Flin Flon. Six years later, production began at Stall Lake Mine. In the 1960s, Anglo American plc, a South African mining company, invested in the company.

In the area near Flin Flon, the company started production at Anderson Lake in 1970 and discovered the Trout Lake deposit in 1974, which began production in 1982. It opened a concentrator at Snow Lake in 1979. In 1987, it discovered the Chisel North mine, which began production in 2001. In 1992, Hudbay closed its original Flin Flon mine; however, that same year, as a result of underground exploration, Hudbay discovered a substantial orebody that became its flagship 777 mine in Flin Flon; it went into development in 1999.

=== Hudbay Minerals ===
On December 21, 2004, OntZinc Corporation (formerly known as Pan American Resources) acquired HBM&S from Anglo American plc for C$316 million in cash and stock. The company was then renamed HudBay Minerals and was listed on the Toronto Stock Exchange.

In 2007, Hudbay located a significant zinc deposit near Snow Lake that became known as Lalor. The deposit also contained a large volume of gold, enough to support its own mine. Production began in 2012 and the mine officially opened in September 2014.

In August 2008, Hudbay acquired Skye Resources, owner of the Fenix Nickel Project in Guatemala, a substantial brownfield lateritic nickel mine and process plant that has been on care and maintenance since 1980, for US$460 million. Sky Resources was sold to Solway Group in 2011 for US$170 million.

In late 2008, the company entered into a merger agreement with Lundin Mining; at the time, Hudbay owned 20% of Lundin Mining. However, the proposed transaction failed to receive investor support due to the 2008 financial crisis and was terminated in February 2009; Hudbay sold its stake in Lundin in May 2009.

In 2008, shortly after the Lalor deposit discovery, the corporate head office was relocated to Toronto, Ontario from Winnipeg, Manitoba.

In early 2009, Hudbay Minerals suspended operations except maintenance at the Chisel North Mine in Snow Lake, Manitoba due to falling zinc metal prices and increased costs. Operations were restarted in 2010.

In March 2011, Hudbay acquired Norsemont Mining and its Constancia copper mine in Peru for C$520 million. Construction on the mine began in August 2012 at a projected cost of $1.5 billion and commercial production commenced in April 2015.

In June 2014, Hudbay acquired Augusta Resource Corporation, owner of the proposed Rosemont Copper project in Arizona, for $555 million. In 2017, Hudbay received the permits necessary to build and operate the mine; however, these permits were overturned by a court in 2019 and that decision was affirmed in an appeal in 2022. The project faced opposition due to possible pollution, water damage, and habitat destruction. to the Supreme Court. The ruling affects other potential mines in the Ninth Circuit that may seek to dispose of waste on public lands under color of the 1872 Mining Law. Instead, Hudbay focused on the nearby Copper World project, discovered in 2021 and on private lands.

In April 2015, Hudbay acquired the Snow Lake gold mine and mill, formerly New Britannia, from QMX Gold for US$12.3 million.

In January 2018, Hudbay acquired mining properties near its Constancia mine in southern Peru.

In December 2018, the company acquired Mason Resources, owner of the Ann Mason project in Nevada.

In February 2019, the company announced a C$124 million refurbishment at the Lalor mine to double production and extend its useful life.

In March 2019, Hudbay extended the life of its 777 mine to 2022.

On February 18, 2020, the community of Chilloroya formally approved a surface rights agreement with Hudbay for the Pampacancha satellite deposit located near the Constancia mine in Peru.

In September 2022, Hudbay closed the 777 mine, along with all production operations in Flin Flon.

In September 2023, Hudbay acquired Rockcliff Metals, with operations in the Snow Lake area of central Manitoba, for C$18 million.

In January 2025, the company sought approval for a $210 million expansion of its Constancia copper mine in Peru. Also in January 2025, the company increased its ownership of Arizona Sonoran Copper Company to 9.99% with a C$20 million investment.

In January 2025, the company received permits and for its Copper World project in Arizona. In April 2025, it received support from labor unions for the project.

In March 2025, the company acquired Mitsubishi Materials' 25% stake in the Copper Mountain mine for $44.25 million, increasing its ownership in the mine to 100%.

In May 2025, the company sold its Tartan West project to Canadian Gold.

== Controversies ==
=== Environmental issues ===
In 2025, the company was criticized after 8,600 litres of waste was released in a month from the company's Copper Mountain mine near Princeton, British Columbia. The company said that there was no danger from the spills.

In 2025, the company was sued to stop its plans for transporting mining waste across protected Arizona State Trust Land.

=== Fatality at Lalor mine ===
In June 2021, operations at the Lalor mine were temporarily suspended after a fatality when a worker fell from a high distance.

=== Murders and rapes at former Guatemalan operations ===
The Fenix Nickel Project in Guatemala was 98.2% owned by Hudbay Minerals from August 2008 to September 2011.

In early January 2007, at least five Mayan communities were forcibly displaced from their lands. Dozens of houses were burnt to the ground. As part of the evictions, 13 Mayan women claimed that they were gang raped in Lote Ocho.

In 2010, a $12 million lawsuit filed in Canada against Hudbay alleged that on September 27, 2009, security personnel employed at the Fenix mine surrounded, beat, and hacked at Adolfo Ich Chamán, a Mayan community leader who was fighting efforts to evict villagers, with machetes, then shot him in the head at close range in an unprovoked attack. German Chub Choc was shot and paralyzed from the waist down. An arrest warrant was issued for the Head of Security at the Fenix mine. He spent four and a half years in prison before being acquitted in a trial in 2017. The 2017 verdict was overturned on appeal and he subsequently pleaded guilty in January 2021 and was convicted of the murder, but faced no further jail time.

In June 2013, the Ontario Superior Court of Justice ruled that Hudbay could be legally responsible for the crimes committed in Guatemala. A jury notice was filed in December 2013.

In October 2024, the civil lawsuits regarding the rapes of the Mayan women, the 2009 killing of Adolfo Ich Chamán, the 2009 shooting and paralysis of German Chub Choc were all settled; compensation was paid to the plaintiffs. Hudbay was represented by Fasken and the lawsuits were "settled without admission of liability by the defendants and with the acknowledgement that the parties continue to have fundamentally differing views on the facts underlying the allegations".
