= Santa Catalina la Tinta =

Santa Catalina la Tinta La Tinta
- Municipality
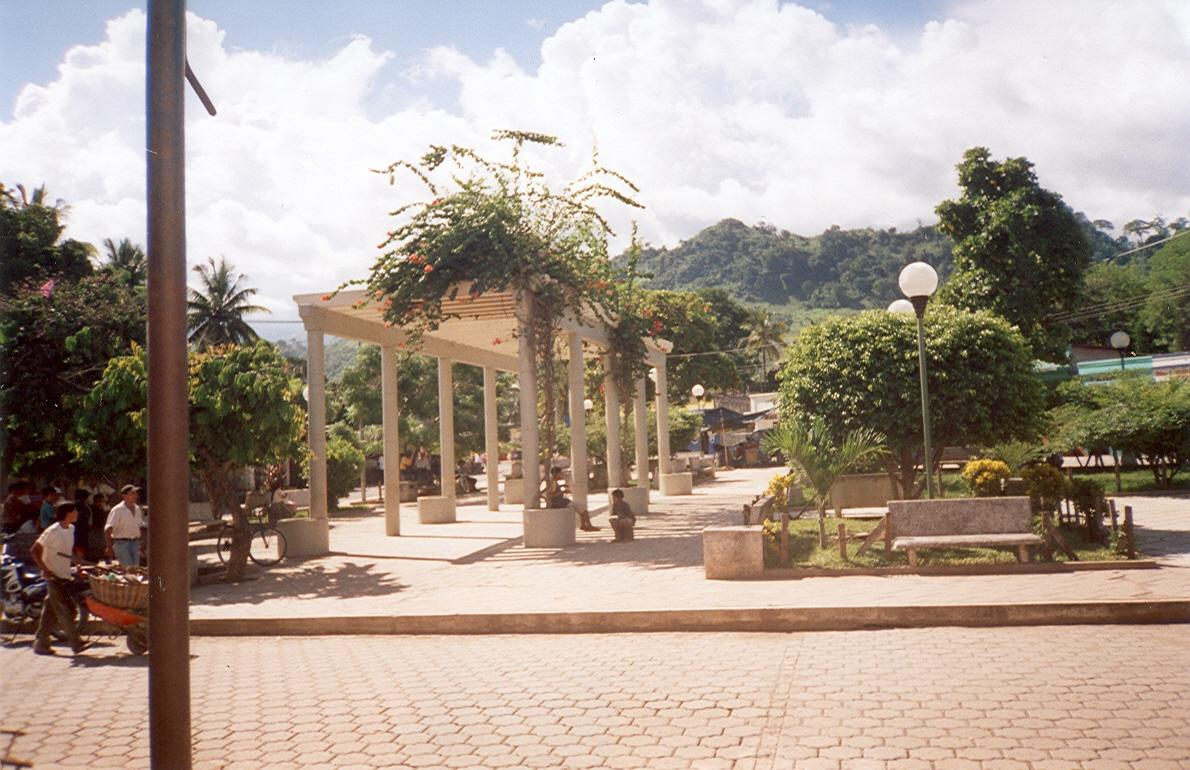
- Central park of Santa Catalina la Tinta

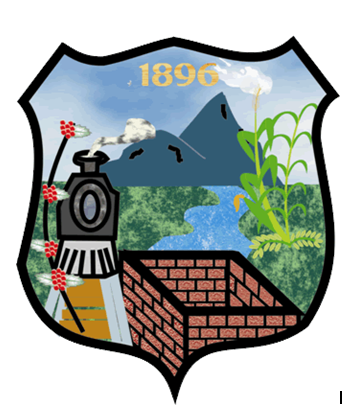
- Seal

- Location in Alta Verapaz Santa Catalina la Tinta (Guatemala)
- Coordinates: 15°18′N 89°55′W
- Country: Guatemala
- Region: Corredor Seco
- Department: Alta Verapaz
- Municipality: Santa Catalina la Tinta

Government
  - Type: Municipal

Area
  - Municipality: 250 km^{2} (97 sq mi)
- Elevation: 195 m (640 ft)

Population (Census 2018)
  - Municipality: 40,516
  - Density: 160/km^{2} (420/sq mi)
  - Urban: 20,552
  - Ethnicities: Q'eqchi' Poqomchi' Ladino
  - Religions: Roman Catholicism Evangelicalism Maya
- Time zone: UTC-6 (Guatemala)
- Climate: Am
- Patron Saint: Saint Catherine of Alexandria (November 24–28)

Santa Catalina la Tinta is a town and municipality in the Guatemalan department of Alta Verapaz. It is located in the hot Polochic River valley. It was originally part of the municipality of Panzós, but was given separate municipal status in 1999. La Tinta is the commercial center of the lower Polochic valley, and merchants and shoppers clog the town's streets especially on the official market days of Tuesdays and Thursdays. The town of Santa Catalina la Tinta is located at 110 km from Cobán and 278 km from Guatemala City and has a population of 20,552 (2018 census).

== History ==
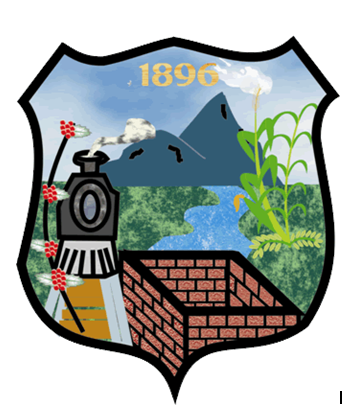
Municipality Seal, designed by Jorge Zoel Tercero. (Note: Tercero designed the seal with the most relevant characteristics of the region: on the top center is the year of foundation (1896), la Sierra de las Minas in the background, with the Río Polochic at its bottom, to the left side there is a front view of the historic Verapaz Railroad, and to the right the water tanks where the jiquilite leaves were chopped. On the sides there are representations of the main products of La Tinta: corn, coffee and cardamom.)

La Tinta settlement was founded on 14 August 1896 by German immigrant Erwin Pablo Dieseldorf, who lived in Cobán, Alta Verapaz, and whom owned the land where the town was settled. Dieseldorf donated a large land portion to his workers, properly registered as rustic farm #12 of Alta Verapaz.

Historically, La Tinta has been as an important political and religious place given that it was there where the Order of Preachers friars established their doctrine's center of operations in the 16th century. However, after the Independence of Central America, due to the expulsion of the regular clergy -first from Central America in 1829, and then from Guatemala in 1873 after Rafael Carrera had brought them back in 1840-, the order properties were confiscated by the Guatemalan government led by Justo Rufino Barrios.

=== Verapaz Railroad ===
Ferrocarril Verapaz main stations in Alta Verapaz.
1. Pancajché
2. Santa Catalina La Tinta
3. Panzós
4. Cobán

Due to the coffee production blossoming during the Liberal regimes and the construction of the Verapaz Railroad in the 1890s, the fluvial port of Panzós became strategically and economically relevant and the municipality offices were transferred from La Tinta to Panzós. Since that moment, La Tinta residents started asking for independence from Panzós, but to no avail.

The Verapaz Railroad began on 15 January 1894 with a contract for 99 years between Guatemala -then ruled by president José María Reina Barrios- and Walter Dauch, representative of the "Verapaz Railroad & Northern Agency Ltd." The contract settled the rules for the construction, maintenance and exploitation of a 30-mile railroad line between Panzós and Pancajché. Passenger service travelled twice a week, on Mondays and Thursdays; besides, mail arrived by ship every Wednesday and cargo came from Livingston, Izabal. Besides, there were train stops in Santa Rosita, Santa Catalina La Tinta, and Papalhá.

In 1898, it was reported that given the coffee prosperity in Cobán, which in those days was the third largest city in Guatemala, the railroad was going to be extended to that city. The railroad was in operation until 1965, when it was superseded by truck and highways.

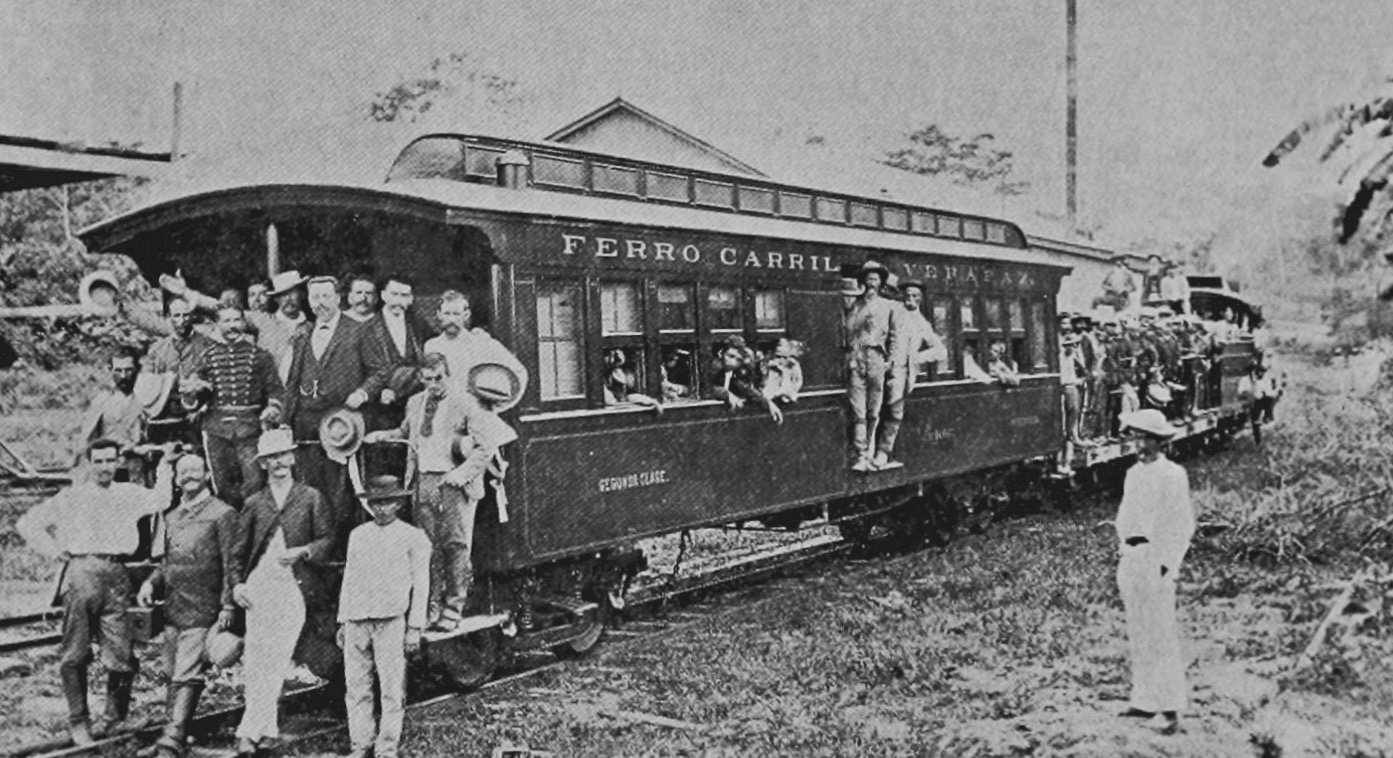
Verapaz Railroad maiden voyage in 1894.

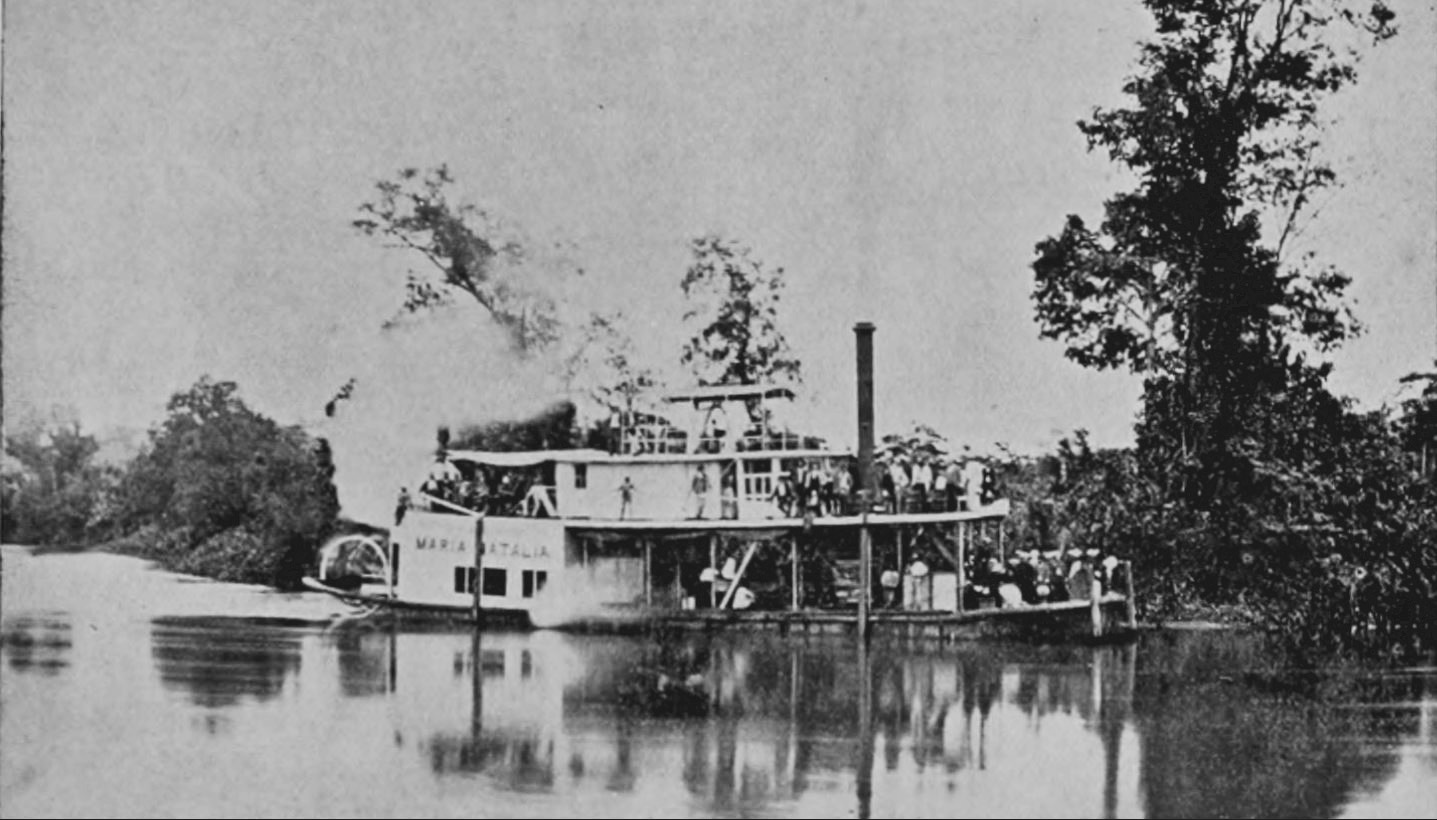
Verapaz Railroad steamboat sailing the Polochic river.

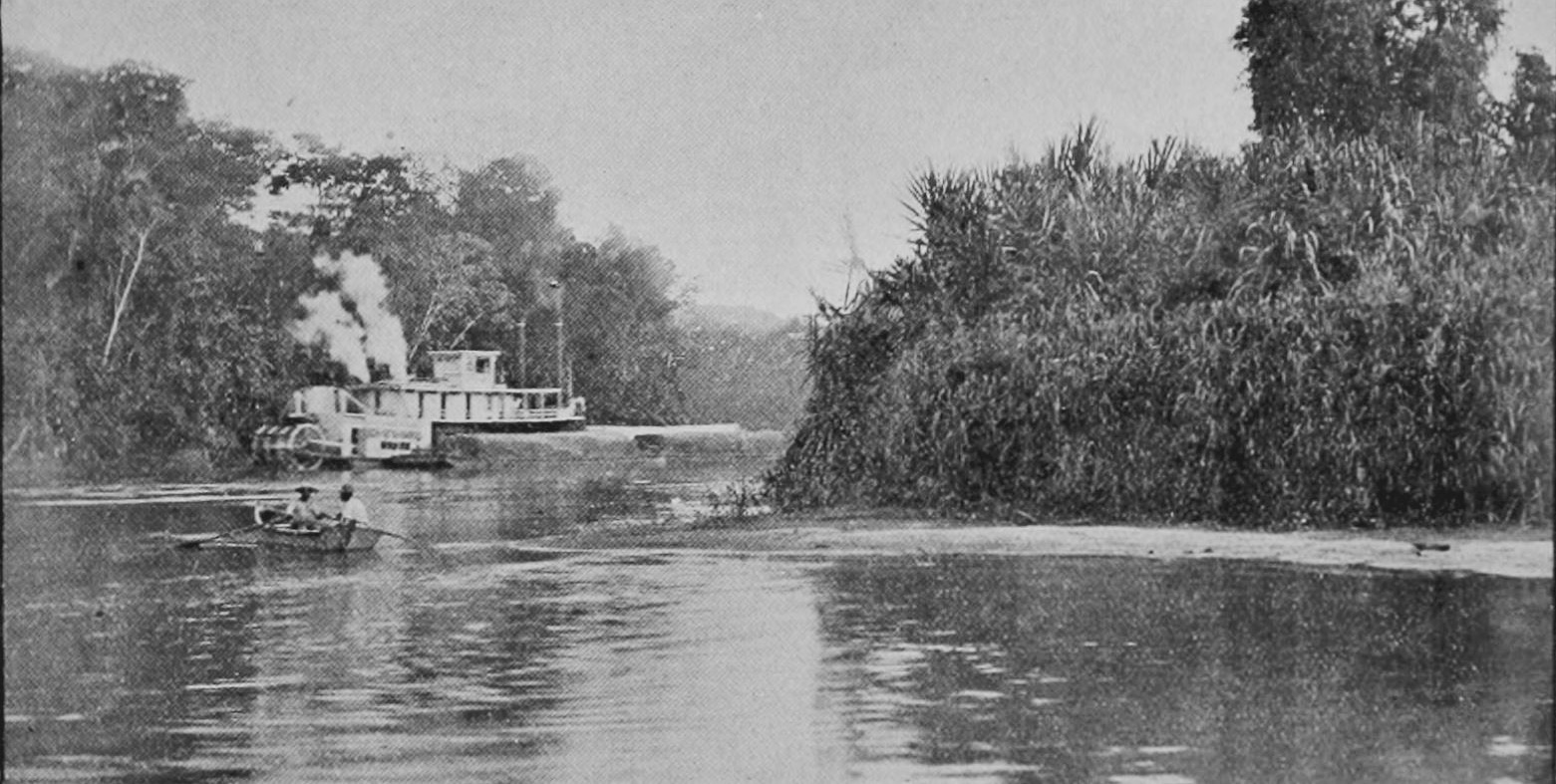
Coffee transport.

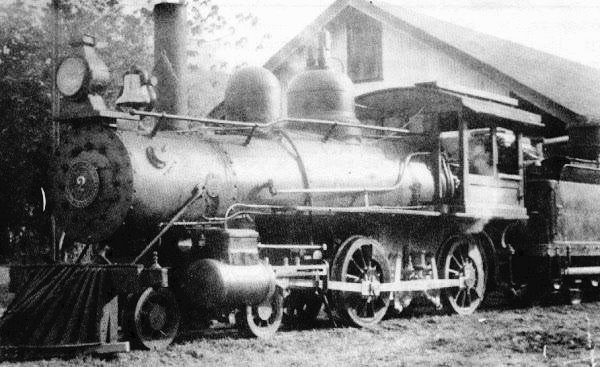
Verapaz Railroad engine in the 1900s.

=== Municipality formation ===
In the 1980s, a committee was set up to get La Tinta the municipality status but these pioneers confronted serious problems, including death threats and had to desist. A new committee was formed in 1987, but it was not until 1999 that the group directed by José Gilberto Artola Choc accomplished the new designation. (Note: The committee members that accomplished the designation of La Tinta as an independent municipality of Alta Verapaz were: president, José Gilberto Artola Choc; vicepresident, José Everildo Morataya; secretary, Eddy Rudy González Xé; second secretary, Hermelindo Reyes García; trustees: Ronny Denis García Mejicanos, Cristóbal Rosales, José Francisco Euler, Carlos Abundio Barrios, Javier Juárez Juárez, Jorge Zoel Tercero and Francisco Cuc.) The reasons they argued to get their independent status were the distance of Panzós from La Tinta (approximately 30 km), the increase in economic activity in La Tinta and decline of Panzós after the Verapaz Railroad ceased operations in the 1960s. The population was more than enough to get the municipality designation.

On 11 November 1999, La Tinta became the sixteenth Alta Verapaz Department municipality, by Decree #42-99 of Congress.

== Municipality Seal ==
On 14 Augusto 1996, when the municipality celebrated its Centennial, it still belonged to Panzós. In those days, professor Jorge Zoel Tercero was appointed as auxiliar mayor of La Tinta who was in charge of the Centennial celebrations; as part of those celebrations, he designed the Seal of La Tinta and placed a copy in the Golden Book of the auxiliary municipality of Panzós -which eventually became the municipality of La Tinta-.

The official presentation of the Seal was during the Centennial celebrations, in presence of then governor of Alta Verapaz Department, Julio Villela Amado, Panzós mayor, Jorge René Rentería Ajcam, and La Tinta auxiliary mayor, Jorge Tercero. Besides the Seal, Tercero wrote a Monographic description of La Tinta.

When La Tinta became a municipality on its own right, the Seal was made official by the first municipal corporation.

== Climate ==
Santa Catalina has a tropical monsoon climate (Köppen: Am).

Climate data for Santa Catalina La Tinta
Month	Jan	Feb	Mar	Apr	May	Jun	Jul	Aug	Sep	Oct	Nov	Dec	Year
Mean daily maximum °C (°F)	30.7 (87.3)	32.4 (90.3)	34.1 (93.4)	35.2 (95.4)	34.7 (94.5)	34.0 (93.2)	33.2 (91.8)	33.6 (92.5)	33.4 (92.1)	32.6 (90.7)	31.3 (88.3)	30.5 (86.9)	33.0 (91.4)
Daily mean °C (°F)	26.0 (78.8)	26.8 (80.2)	28.3 (82.9)	29.3 (84.7)	29.3 (84.7)	28.9 (84.0)	28.5 (83.3)	28.7 (83.7)	28.6 (83.5)	28.0 (82.4)	26.9 (80.4)	26.0 (78.8)	27.9 (82.3)
Mean daily minimum °C (°F)	21.3 (70.3)	21.3 (70.3)	22.6 (72.7)	23.5 (74.3)	24.0 (75.2)	23.9 (75.0)	23.9 (75.0)	23.8 (74.8)	23.8 (74.8)	23.5 (74.3)	22.5 (72.5)	21.6 (70.9)	23.0 (73.3)
Average precipitation mm (inches)	55 (2.2)	44 (1.7)	47 (1.9)	91 (3.6)	175 (6.9)	382 (15.0)	487 (19.2)	388 (15.3)	362 (14.3)	234 (9.2)	123 (4.8)	60 (2.4)	2,448 (96.5)
Source: Climate-Data.org

== Geographic location ==
The limits of the municipality of Santa Catalina La Tinta are defined as follows:

=== Distances ===
From this municipality to:

- Cobán, capital of Alta Verapaz Department: 93 km
- Guatemala City, capital of Guatemala: 245 km
- municipality of Tucurú: 32 km
- municipality of Tamahú: 48 km
- municipality of Tactic: 60 km
- Telemán settlement in municipality of Panzós: 15 km
- municipality of Senahú: 40 km
- municipality of Panzós: 30 km
- municipality of El Estor, Izabal: 85 km

== See also ==
- Alta Verapaz Department
- Franja Transversal del Norte
- Panzós

== Notes and references ==
=== Bibliography ===
- La Ilustración del Pacífico (15 March 1898). "La revolución de septiembre". La Ilustración del Pacífico (in Spanish). II (38). Guatemala: Siguere, Guirola and Co.
