= Poqomchiʼ language =

Mayan language spoken in Guatemala

Poqomchiʼ
- Poqomchiiʼ
- Pronunciation: [poqomt͡ʃi:ʔ]
- Native to: Guatemala
- Region: Baja Verapaz
- Ethnicity: 177,000 Poqomchiʼ (2019 census)
- Native speakers: 130,000 (2019 census); 40,000 monolinguals (2017)
- Language family: Mayan: Quichean–Mamean; Greater Quichean; Poqom; Poqomchiʼ
- Dialects: Eastern; Western

Language codes
- ISO 639-3: poh
- Glottolog: poqo1254
- ELP: Poqomchi'

Poqomchiʼ (Pokomchi: Poqomchiiʼ) is a Mayan language spoken by the Poqomchiʼ Maya of Guatemala, and is very closely related to Poqomam. Its two main dialects, eastern and western, were spoken by 90,000 or so people in the year 2000, in Purulhá, Baja Verapaz, and in the following municipalities of Alta Verapaz: Santa Cruz Verapaz, San Cristóbal Verapaz, Tactic, Tamahú and Tucurú. It is also the predominant language in Aldea Belejú, in the municipality of Chicamán (El Quiché), which borders Alta Verapaz.

== Geographic distribution ==
Poq'omchí is spoken in the following municipalities of Alta Verapaz, Baja Verapaz, and El Quiché departments (Variación Dialectal en Poqom, 2000).

- Alta Verapaz
  - Panzós (in the community of San Vicente II)
  - La Tinta
  - Tucurú
  - Tamahú
  - Tactic
  - Santa Cruz Verapaz
  - San Cristóbal Verapaz
- El Quiché
  - Chicamán (in the aldea of Belejú)
- Baja Verapaz
  - Purulhá (in the community of Ribalcó)

== Phonology ==
=== Consonants ===
		Bilabial	Dental	Alveolar	Post- alveolar	Palatal	Velar	Uvular	Glottal
Plosive/ Affricate	voiceless	p	t	ts	tʃ		k	q	ʔ
Plosive/ Affricate	ejective	pʼ	tʼ	tsʼ	tʃʼ		kʼ	qʼ	
Plosive/ Affricate	implosive	ɓ							
Fricative				s	ʃ			χ	h
Nasal		m		n					
Trill				r					
Approximant	central			l		j	w		
Approximant	glottalized						(wʼ)		

- In Western Poqomchi', /ɓ/ is non-existent and a glottalized /wʼ/ occurs in alteration. Sometimes an allophone of /wʼ/ can be heard as [mʼ].
- /pʼ/ mainly exists among the western dialects.
- /r/ can be heard as a flap [ɾ] when occurring word-medially.
- /l/ is devoiced to a voiceless fricative [ɬ] following a glottal consonant.

=== Vowels ===
	Front	Back
Close	i iː	u uː
Mid	e eː	o oː
Open	a aː	

- Short allophones of vowels /i/, /a o/ can be heard as [ɪ], [ə].
