= Poqomchiʼ =

Poqomchiʼ may refer to:

- Poqomchiʼ people, an ethnic group of Guatemala
- Poqomchiʼ language, a Mayan language
