= Ricardo Trigueño =

Guatemalan footballer

Personal information
- Full name: Ricardo Alberto Trigueño Foster
- Date of birth: April 17, 1980 (age 46)
- Place of birth: Livingston, Guatemala
- Height: 1.85 m (6 ft 1 in)
- Position: Goalkeeper

Team information
- Current team: Zacapa
- Number: 1

Youth career
- Comunicaciones

Senior career*
Years	Team	Apps	(Gls)
2001–2004	Aurora	88	(0)
2004–2005	Suchitepéquez	11	(0)
2005–2007	Marquense	70	(0)
2007–2010	Petapa	49	(0)
2010–2011	Malacateco	44	(0)
2011–2012	Petapa	40	(0)
2012–2013	Xelajú	5	(0)
2013-2014	Suchitepéquez	42	(0)
2014	USAC	41	(0)
2016–2017	Sacachispas	15	(0)
2017–2019	Iztapa	34	(0)
2020	San Pedro	17	(0)
2021	Quiché	20	(0)
2021–	Zacapa	3	(0)

International career^{‡}
2003–2011	Guatemala	53	(0)
- * Club domestic league appearances and goals as of 20 February 2007 ‡ National team caps and goals as of 2 April 2010

Ricardo Alberto Trigueño Foster (born 17 April 1980) is a Guatemalan former professional footballer who played as a goalkeeper.

== Club career ==
Trigueño started his career at Aurora before moving to Suchitepéquez, who he left after only one season. After joining Marquense in 2005 he joined Petapa in 2007. In late 2009, Marquense appealed to CAS since they argued they still owned his sporting rights.

== International career ==
He made his debut for Guatemala in a January 2003 friendly match against El Salvador and had earned 51 caps at the start of January 2010. He has represented his country during the 2006 World Cup qualification campaign, as well as at the 2007 CONCACAF Gold Cup.
