= Purulhá =

- Municipality
- Location in Guatemala
- Coordinates: 15°16′00″N 90°12′00″W
- Country: Guatemala
- Department: Baja Verapaz

Government
  - Mayor: Sebastián Castro García

Area
  - Municipality: 536 km^{2} (207 sq mi)

Population (2018 census)
  - Municipality: 56,822
  - Density: 106/km^{2} (275/sq mi)
  - Urban: 7,901
- Climate: Cfb

Purulhá is a town and municipality in the Baja Verapaz department of Guatemala. It is situated at 1,570 m (5,151 ft) above sea level. The municipality covers an area of 536 km² and the population was 56,822 at the 2018 census. The annual festival is June 10-June 13.

== History ==
=== Verapaz Railroad ===
Ferrocarril Verapaz main stations in Alta Verapaz.
1. Pancajché
2. Santa Catalina La Tinta
3. Panzós
4. Cobán

The Verapaz Railroad began on 15 January 1894 with a contract for 99 years between Guatemala, then ruled by president José María Reina Barrios, and Walter Dauch, representative of the "Verapaz Railroad & Northern Agency Ltd." The contract settled the rules for the construction and maintenance of a 30 mile railroad line between Panzós and Pancajché. Passenger service travelled twice a week, on Mondays and Thursdays; mail also arrived by ship every Wednesday and cargo came from Livingston, Izabal. Besides, there were train stops in Santa Rosita, Santa Catalina La Tinta, and Papalhá.

In 1898, it was reported that given the coffee prosperity in Cobán, which in those days was the third largest city in Guatemala, the railroad was going to be extended to that city. The railroad was in operation until 1965, when it was superseded by truck and highways.

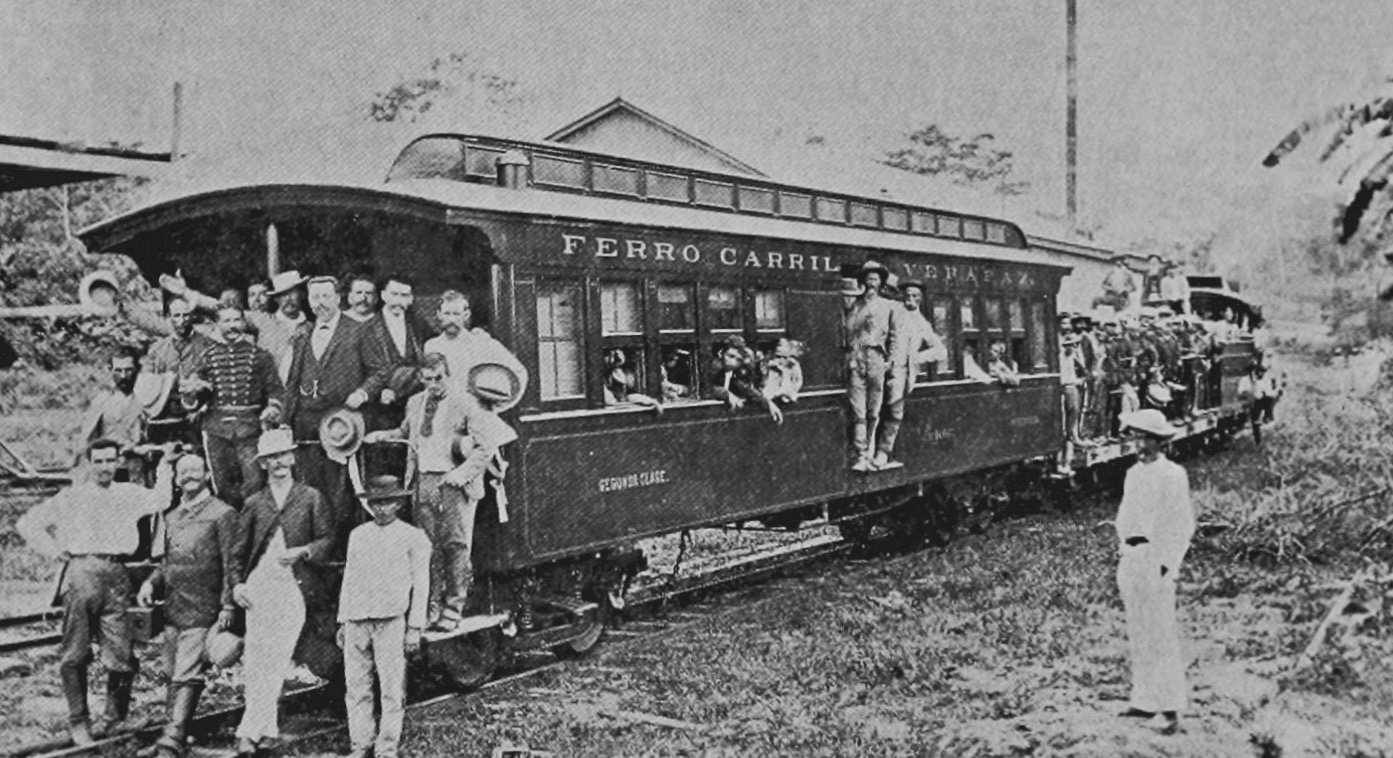
Verapaz Railroad maiden voyage in 1894.

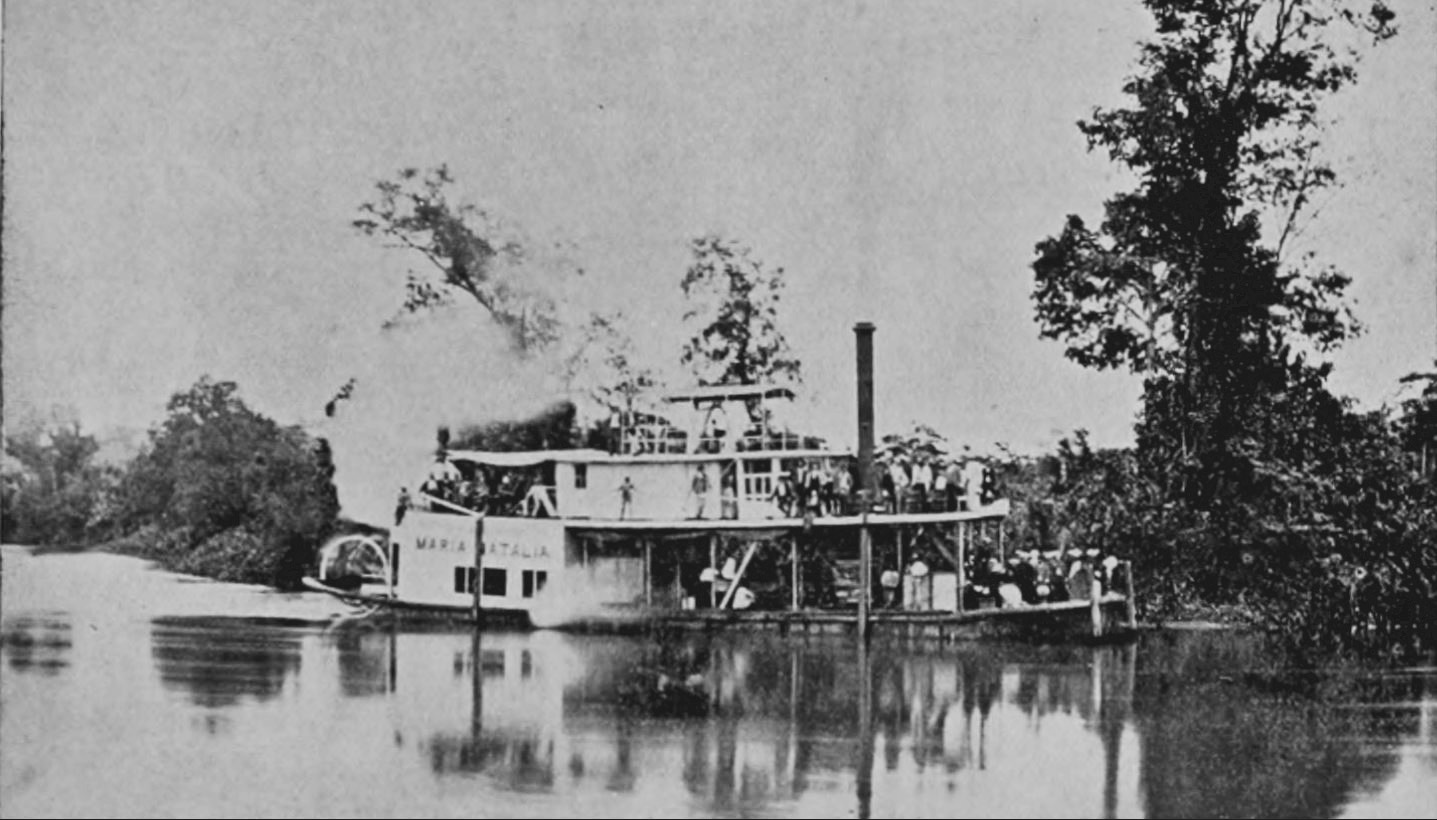
Verapaz Railroad steamboat sailing the Polochic river.

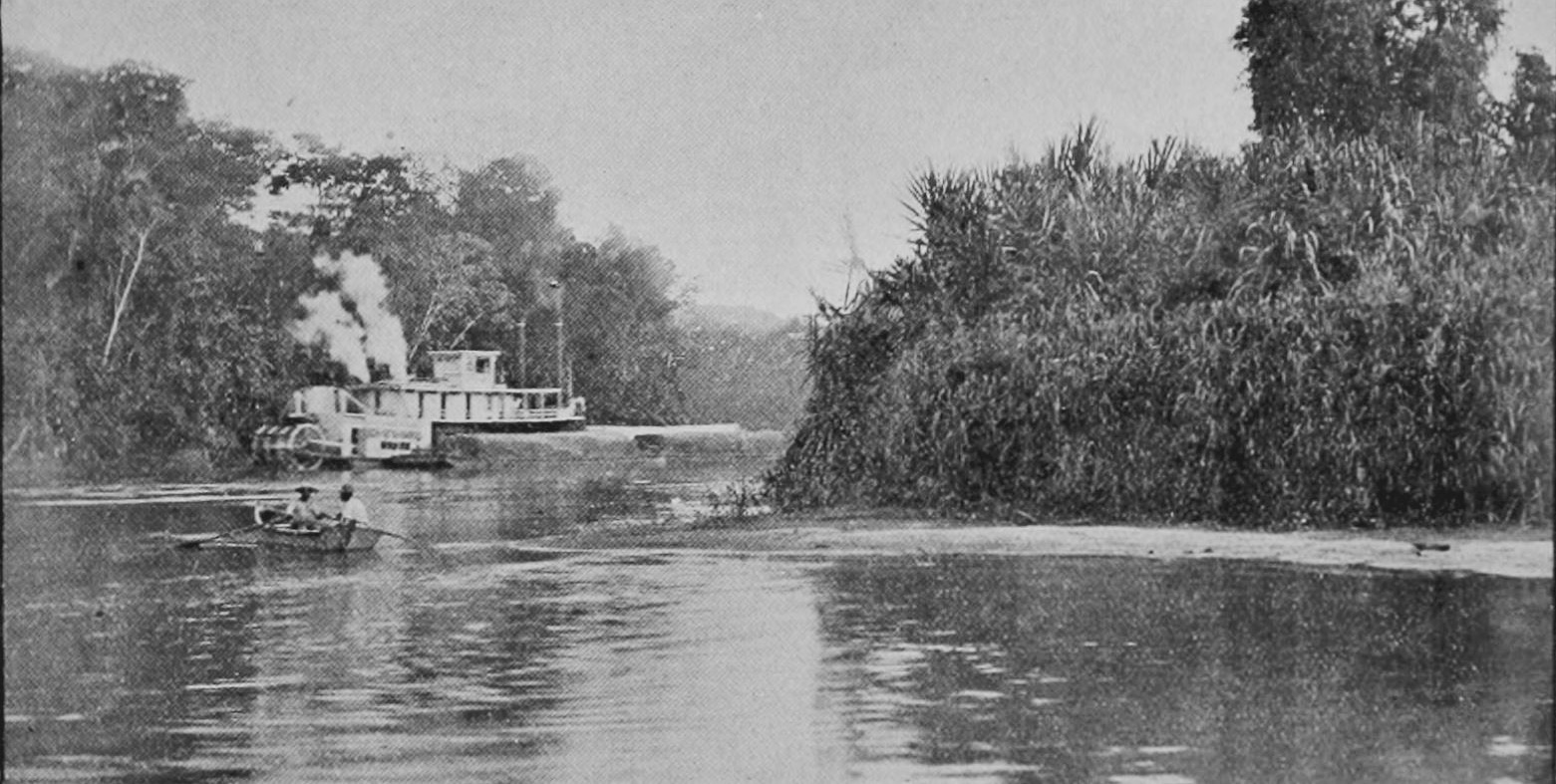
Coffee transport.

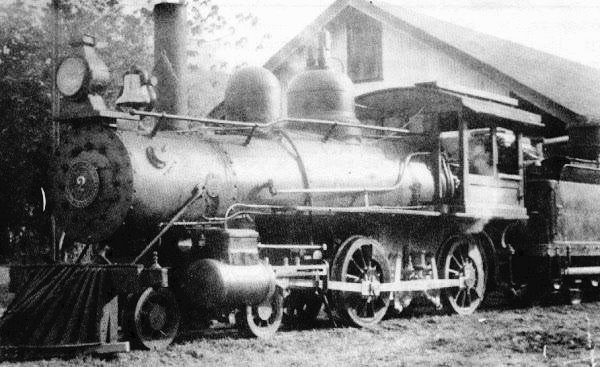
Verapaz Railroad engine in the 1900s.

=== Thomae family ===
The Thomae family, coming from German settlers from the 1880s, was the ruling family in Purulhá for most of the 20th century. By taking advantage of the pro-German policies of president Justo Rufino Barrios, Mauricio Thomae gathered the following coffee haciendas:

Year	Hacienda	Location
1882	Cubilgüitz	Cobán
1889	San Isidro	Purulhá
1897	Comija	Tamahú
1897	Popabaj	Tucurú
1900	Nueve Aguas	Purulhá
1902	Panzal	Purulhá
1902	Rocjá	Tamahú
1902	Paijá	Tucurú
1905	Chimox	Tucurú

During the régime of general Jorge Ubico (1931-1944), Mauricio Thomae became one of the most influential German Verapaz landowners, along with the Sarg, Sapper and Diesseldorf families. He took advantage of his close relationship with president Ubico, who had been Cobán's governor during the presidency of Manuel Estrada Cabrera and befriended several German families, including Thomae's.

For most of the 20th century, the Thomae family kept Puruhlá under its control thanks to their large coffee plantations and farm land holdings, and despite the expulsion of most Germans from Guatemala during World War II. After the coffee crisis in 2000, the Thomaes diversified their investments into the power, tourism and forest incentive businesses; in fact, by 2015 they were planning on building the Enerjá megaproject (25 MW) which will connect to their other power generation project, El Cafetal (8,36 MW) in Finca Bremen, also owned by the Thomaes.

== Climate ==
Purulhá has a temperate climate (Köppen climate classification: Cfb).

Climate data for Purulhá
Month	Jan	Feb	Mar	Apr	May	Jun	Jul	Aug	Sep	Oct	Nov	Dec	Year
Mean daily maximum °C (°F)	18.8 (65.8)	20.2 (68.4)	21.7 (71.1)	22.4 (72.3)	22.8 (73.0)	22.2 (72.0)	21.5 (70.7)	21.8 (71.2)	22.0 (71.6)	21.1 (70.0)	20.3 (68.5)	19.7 (67.5)	21.2 (70.2)
Daily mean °C (°F)	14.6 (58.3)	15.4 (59.7)	16.7 (62.1)	17.5 (63.5)	18.2 (64.8)	18.2 (64.8)	17.8 (64.0)	17.8 (64.0)	17.9 (64.2)	17.3 (63.1)	16.2 (61.2)	15.3 (59.5)	16.9 (62.4)
Mean daily minimum °C (°F)	10.4 (50.7)	10.7 (51.3)	11.8 (53.2)	12.6 (54.7)	13.6 (56.5)	14.3 (57.7)	14.1 (57.4)	13.9 (57.0)	13.9 (57.0)	13.5 (56.3)	12.1 (53.8)	10.9 (51.6)	12.7 (54.8)
Average precipitation mm (inches)	81 (3.2)	48 (1.9)	68 (2.7)	68 (2.7)	174 (6.9)	325 (12.8)	329 (13.0)	245 (9.6)	272 (10.7)	205 (8.1)	125 (4.9)	66 (2.6)	2,006 (79.1)
Source: Climate-Data.org

== See also ==
- List of places in Guatemala

== Notes and references ==
=== Bibliography ===
- La Ilustración del Pacífico (15 March 1898). "La revolución de septiembre". La Ilustración del Pacífico (in Spanish). II (38). Guatemala: Siguere, Guirola y Cía.
