= Tucurú =

Tucurú San Miguel Tucurú
- Municipality
- Location in Alta Verapaz Tucurú (Guatemala)
- Coordinates: 15°18′0″N 90°04′0″W
- Country: Guatemala
- Department: Alta Verapaz

Government
  - Mayor: René Alfredo Tun (PP)

Area
  - Municipality: 219 km^{2} (85 sq mi)
- Elevation: 477 m (1,565 ft)

Population (2018 census)
  - Municipality: 43,473
  - Density: 199/km^{2} (514/sq mi)
  - Urban: 4,064
- Time zone: GMT -6
- Climate: Af

Tucurú is a small town and municipality in the Guatemalan department of Alta Verapaz. The municipality population was 43,473 at the 2018 census. It is located in the central highlands of the country, known for its rich cultural heritage and natural beauty.

== History ==
=== Verapaz Railroad ===
Ferrocarril Verapaz main stations in Alta Verapaz.
1. Pancajché
2. Santa Catalina La Tinta
3. Panzós
4. Cobán

The Verapaz Railroad began on 15 January 1894 with a contract for 99 years between Guatemala, then ruled by president José María Reina Barrios and Walter Dauch, representative of the "Verapaz Railroad & Northern Agency Ltd." The contract settled the rules for the construction and maintenance of a 30-mile railroad line between Panzós and Pancajché. Passenger service travelled twice a week, on Mondays and Thursdays; mail also arrived by ship every Wednesday and cargo came from Livingston, Izabal. Besides, there were train stops in Santa Rosita, Santa Catalina La Tinta, and Papalhá.

In 1898, it was reported that given the coffee prosperity in Cobán, which in those days was the third largest city in Guatemala, the railroad was going to be extended to that city. The railroad was in operation until 1965, when it was superseded by truck and highways.

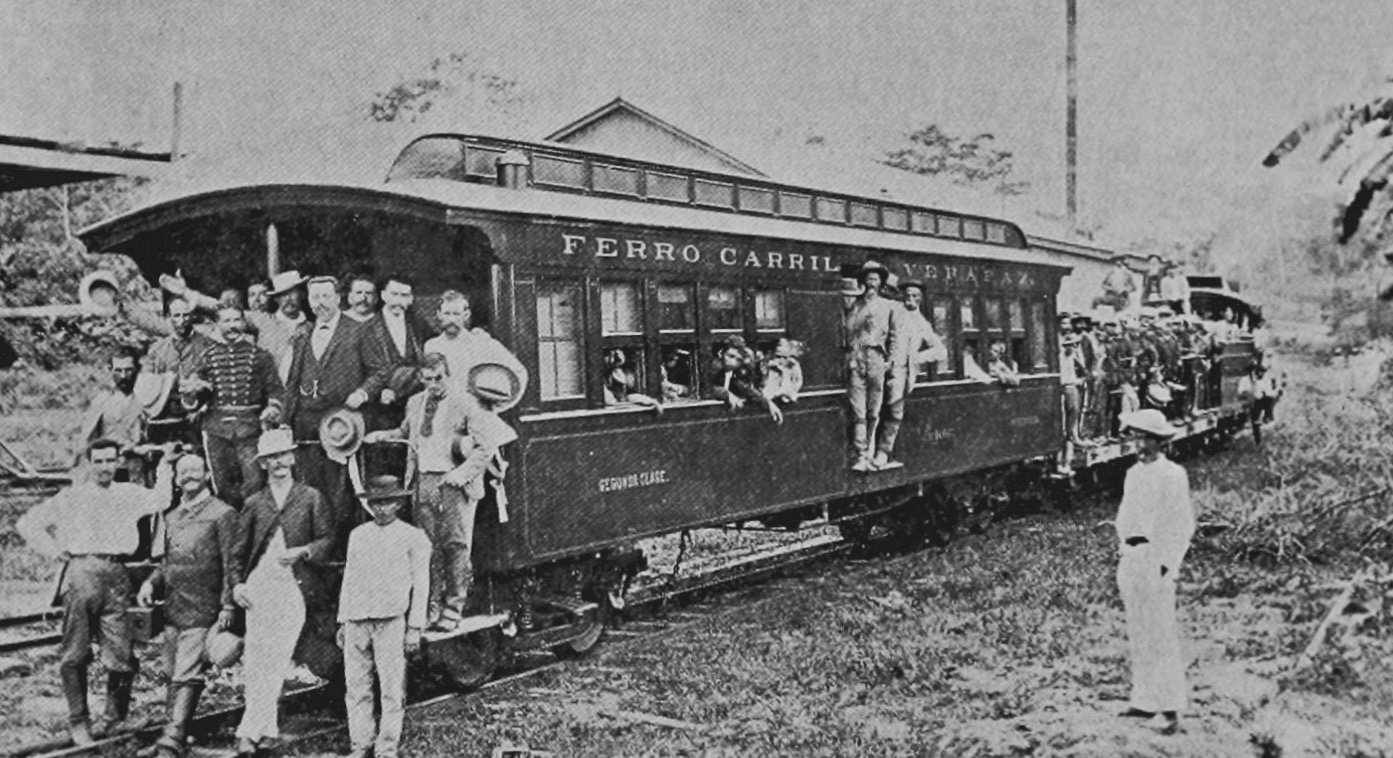
Verapaz Railroad maiden voyage in 1894.

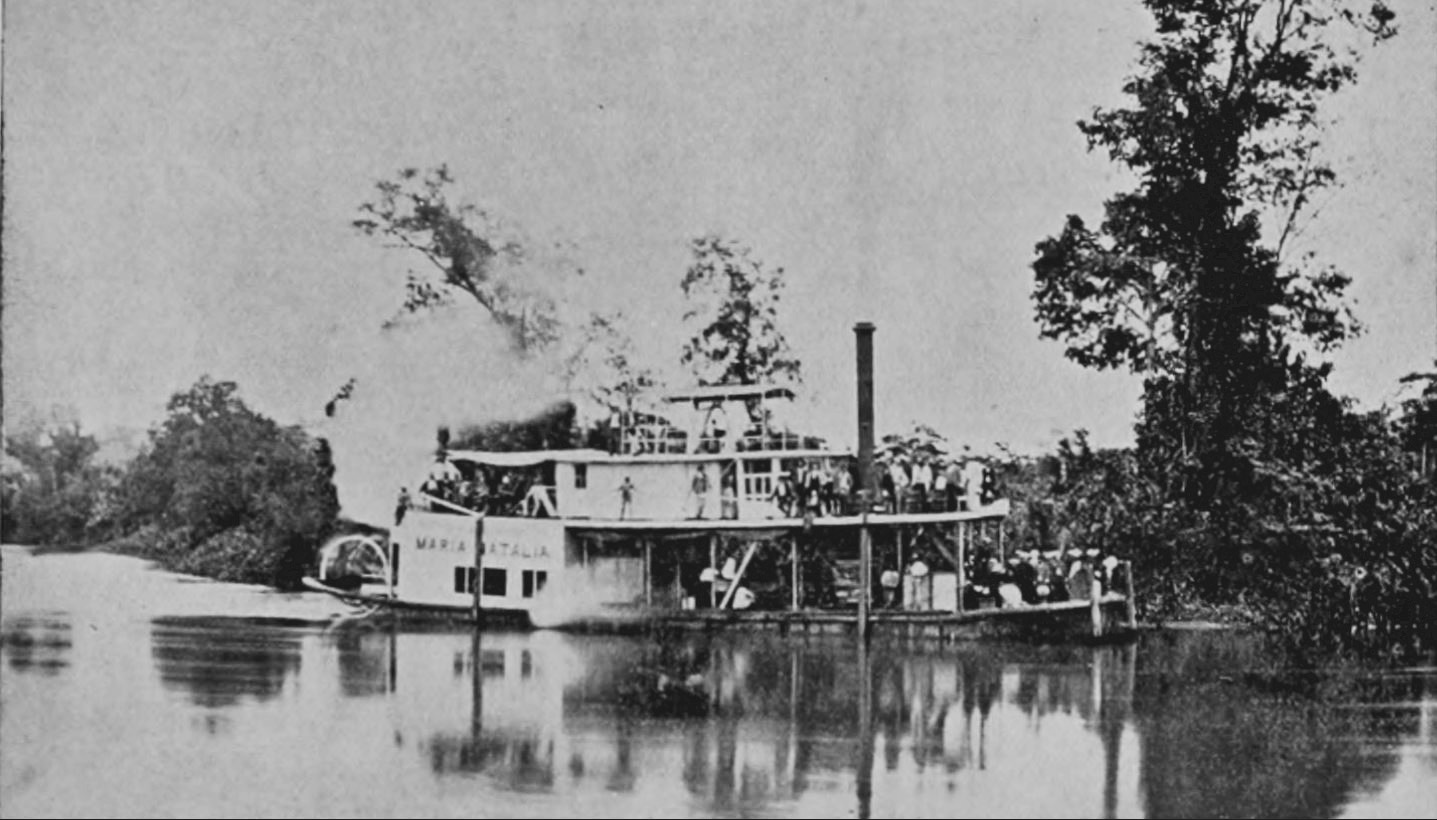
Verapaz Railroad steamboat sailing the Polochic river.

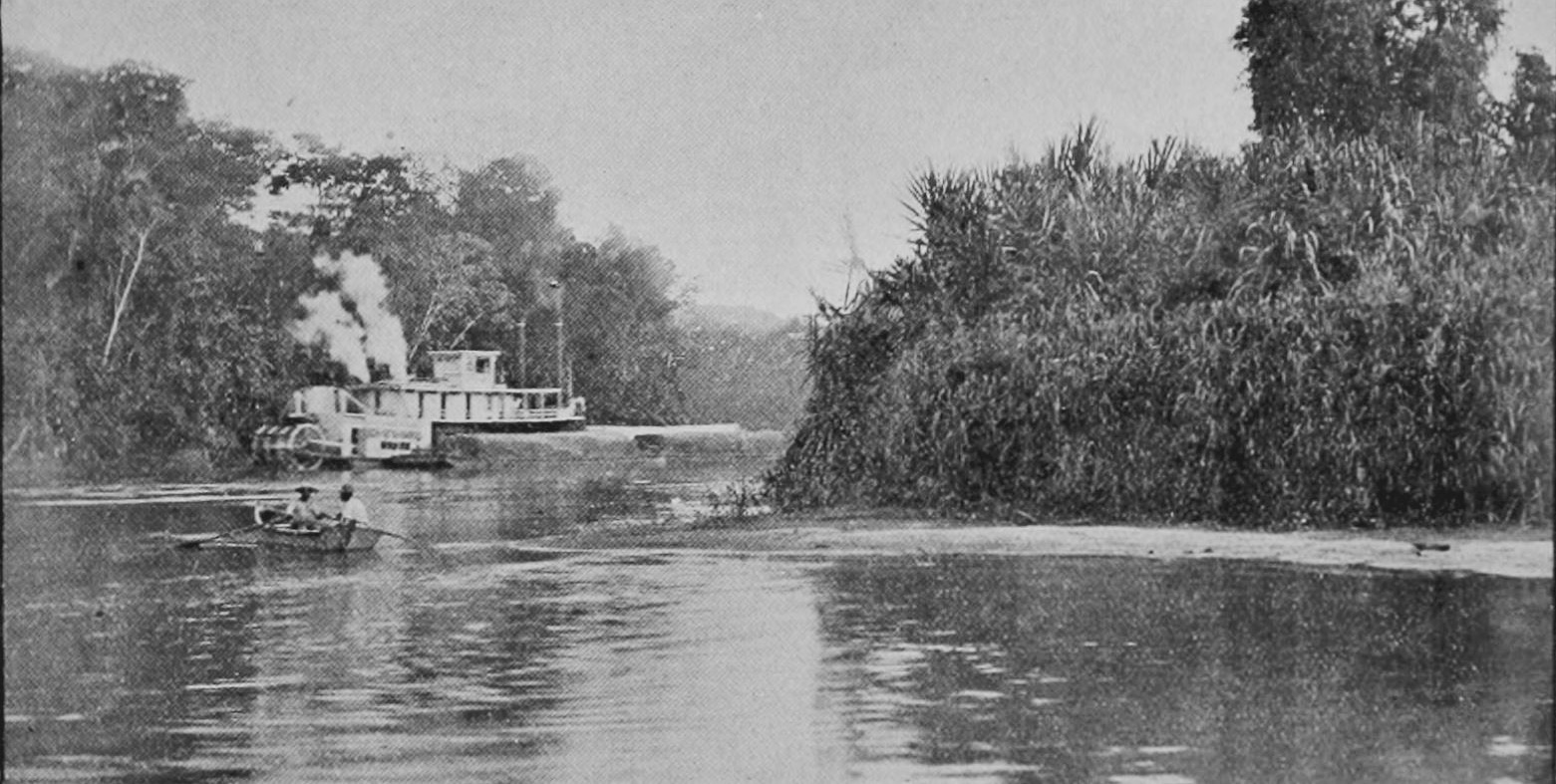
Coffee transport.

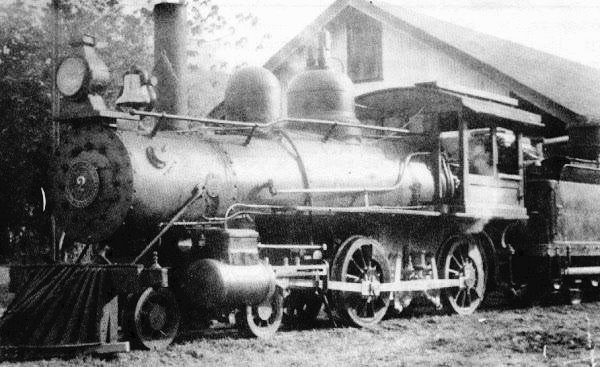
Verapaz Railroad engine in the 1900s.

=== Thomae family ===
One of the most powerful German families that settled in the region by the end of the 19th century was the Thomae family, who had their headquarters in neighbor Purulhá. Mauricio Thomae's early farmland had the following haciendas:

Year	Hacienda	Location
1882	Cubilgüitz	Cobán
1889	San Isidro	Purulhá
1897	Comija	Tamahú
1897	Popabaj	Tucurú
1900	Nueve Aguas	Purulhá
1902	Panzal	Purulhá
1902	Rocjá	Tamahú
1902	Paijá	Tucurú
1905	Chimox	Tucurú

Years later, during general Jorge Ubico's presidency (1931–1944), Thomae went on to become one of the most influential landlords in the German Verapaz, along with the Sarg, Sapper and Diesseldorf families. Ubico had been governor of Cobán during Manuel Estrada Cabrera 22-year regime and befriended several German families, including the Thomaes.

== Climate ==
Tucurú has a tropical rainforest climate (Köppen: Af).

Climate data for Tucurú
Month	Jan	Feb	Mar	Apr	May	Jun	Jul	Aug	Sep	Oct	Nov	Dec	Year
Mean daily maximum °C (°F)	27.8 (82.0)	29.7 (85.5)	30.9 (87.6)	32.4 (90.3)	32.0 (89.6)	31.1 (88.0)	30.1 (86.2)	30.7 (87.3)	30.6 (87.1)	29.6 (85.3)	28.5 (83.3)	27.9 (82.2)	30.1 (86.2)
Daily mean °C (°F)	22.6 (72.7)	23.8 (74.8)	25.0 (77.0)	26.4 (79.5)	26.5 (79.7)	26.1 (79.0)	25.5 (77.9)	25.8 (78.4)	25.8 (78.4)	25.0 (77.0)	23.8 (74.8)	23.0 (73.4)	24.9 (76.9)
Mean daily minimum °C (°F)	17.5 (63.5)	18.0 (64.4)	19.2 (66.6)	20.5 (68.9)	21.0 (69.8)	21.1 (70.0)	21.0 (69.8)	20.9 (69.6)	21.0 (69.8)	20.4 (68.7)	19.1 (66.4)	18.2 (64.8)	19.8 (67.7)
Average precipitation mm (inches)	88 (3.5)	62 (2.4)	64 (2.5)	96 (3.8)	185 (7.3)	373 (14.7)	397 (15.6)	307 (12.1)	385 (15.2)	394 (15.5)	159 (6.3)	92 (3.6)	2,602 (102.5)
Source: Climate-Data.org

== See also ==
- Alta Verapaz Department

== Notes and references ==
=== Bibliography ===
- La Ilustración del Pacífico (15 March 1898). "La revolución de septiembre". La Ilustración del Pacífico (in Spanish). II (38). Guatemala: Siguere, Guirola y Cía.
