= Senahú =

- Municipality
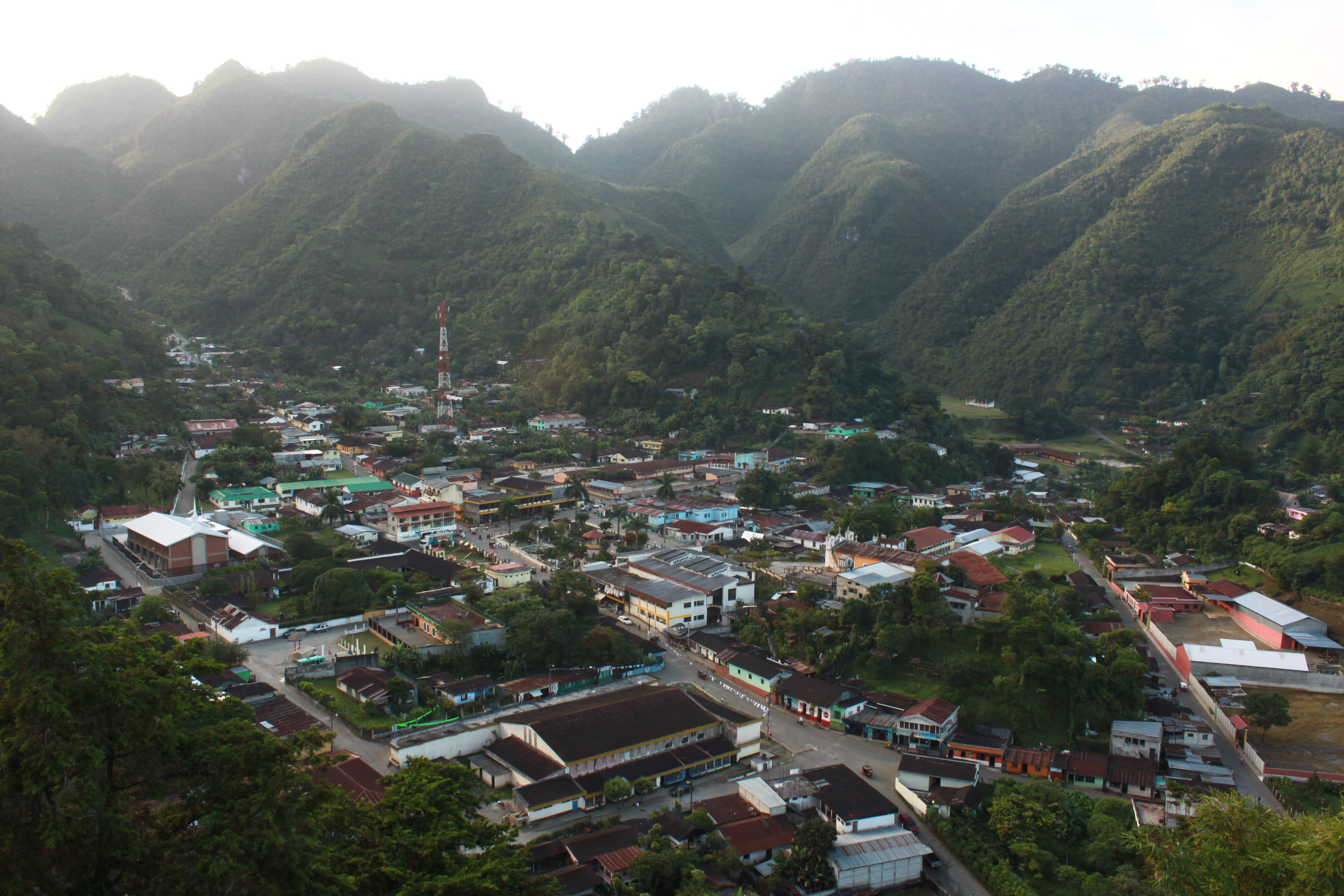

- Location in Guatemala
- Coordinates: 15°24′59″N 89°49′13″W
- Country: Guatemala
- Department: Alta Verapaz
- Municipality: Senahú

Government
  - Type: Municipal
  - Mayor: Mónica Milián (LIDER)

Area
  - Municipality: 736 km^{2} (284 sq mi)
- Elevation: 970 m (3,180 ft)

Population (Census 2018)
  - Municipality: 91,974
  - Density: 125/km^{2} (324/sq mi)
  - Urban: 12,084
  - Ethnicities: Q'eqchi' Ladino
  - Religions: Roman Catholicism Evangelicalism Maya
- Climate: Af

Senahú is a town and municipality of the Department of Alta Verapaz in the Republic of Guatemala.

The community of San Antonio Senahú was founded by Q'eqchi' Mayan refugees from a series of 19th-century conflicts in the Ishi Mountains of Central Guatemala. By the mid-1870s, it had become a center of German settlement in Guatemala and a major source of coffee for the European market.

On June 7, 2005 a mudslide killed 23 people, including several children. Most of the dead were of Mayan descent.

The region's wealth is still formed by big coffee farms and other agricultural products. In the natural resources it can be found the river of the farm "Trece Aguas", the waterfalls Sereizi and a viewpoint in the general cemetery. Other famous places are the ruins of Chijolom and La Providencia. The crafts elaborated in this region are weaves, ceramics, basketwork, rigs, musical instruments, masks, bed rolls of palm, chandler's shop, objects of "tule" and fireworks.

The approximated extension for this municipality is of 736 km², with a total population of 91,974 (2018 census). Its neighbours are, at the north boundaries Cahabón and Lanquín (Alta Verapaz), south with Panzos and Tucurú, east with El Estor (Izabal), west with Tucurú and San Pedró Carcha (Alta Verapaz). The municipality is formed by 1 town and 41 communities.

== Languages spoken ==
The chief languages are Mayan Q'eqchi' and Spanish.

== Important dates ==
- March 13, 1869 – By Governmental Agreement the region was raised to municipality.

== Celebrations ==
June, 8-13 – In Honor of San Antonio. Each year at the end of August, a festival of San Antonio de Padua celebrating native peoples is held here. The festivities include a beauty contest for Q'eqchi' Maya women, the winner of which is crowned with the title "Miss Senahuk".

== Franja Transversal del Norte ==
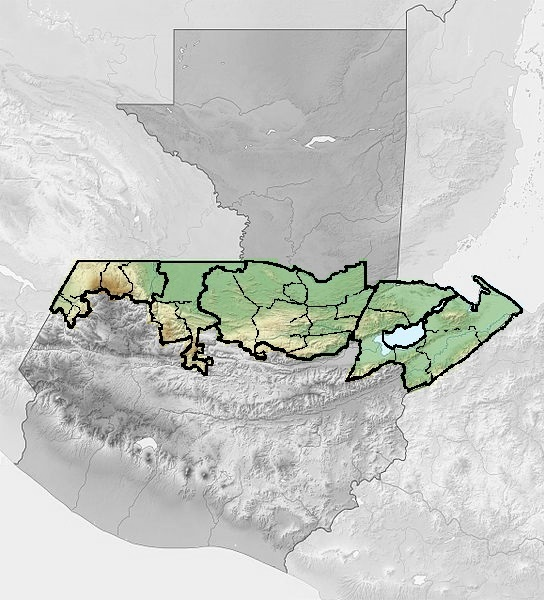
Location of Senahú in Franja Transversal del Norte

The Northern Transversal Strip was officially created during the government of General Carlos Arana Osorio in 1970, by Legislative Decree 60-70, for agricultural development. The decree literally said: "It is of public interest and national emergency, the establishment of Agrarian Development Zones in the area included within the municipalities: San Ana Huista, San Antonio Huista, Nentón, Jacaltenango, San Mateo Ixtatán, and Santa Cruz Barillas in Huehuetenango; Chajul and San Miguel Uspantán in Quiché; Cobán, Chisec, San Pedro Carchá, Lanquín, Senahú, Cahabón and Chahal, in Alta Verapaz and the entire department of Izabal."

== Climate ==
Senahú has a tropical climate (Köppen: Af).

Climate data for Senahú
Month	Jan	Feb	Mar	Apr	May	Jun	Jul	Aug	Sep	Oct	Nov	Dec	Year
Daily mean °C (°F)	19.3 (66.7)	20.3 (68.5)	21.6 (70.9)	22.8 (73.0)	23.2 (73.8)	23.0 (73.4)	22.6 (72.7)	22.7 (72.9)	22.7 (72.9)	21.7 (71.1)	20.6 (69.1)	19.8 (67.6)	21.7 (71.1)
Average precipitation mm (inches)	141 (5.6)	110 (4.3)	106 (4.2)	142 (5.6)	313 (12.3)	621 (24.4)	691 (27.2)	546 (21.5)	535 (21.1)	395 (15.6)	207 (8.1)	138 (5.4)	3,945 (155.3)
Source: Climate-Data.org

== See also ==
- Franja Transversal del Norte

== Notes and references ==
=== Bibliography ===
- Solano, Luis (2012). "Contextualización histórica de la Franja Transversal del Norte (FTN)" (PDF). Centro de Estudios y Documentación de la Frontera Occidental de Guatemala, CEDFOG (in Spanish).
