= San Pedro Carchá =

- Municipality
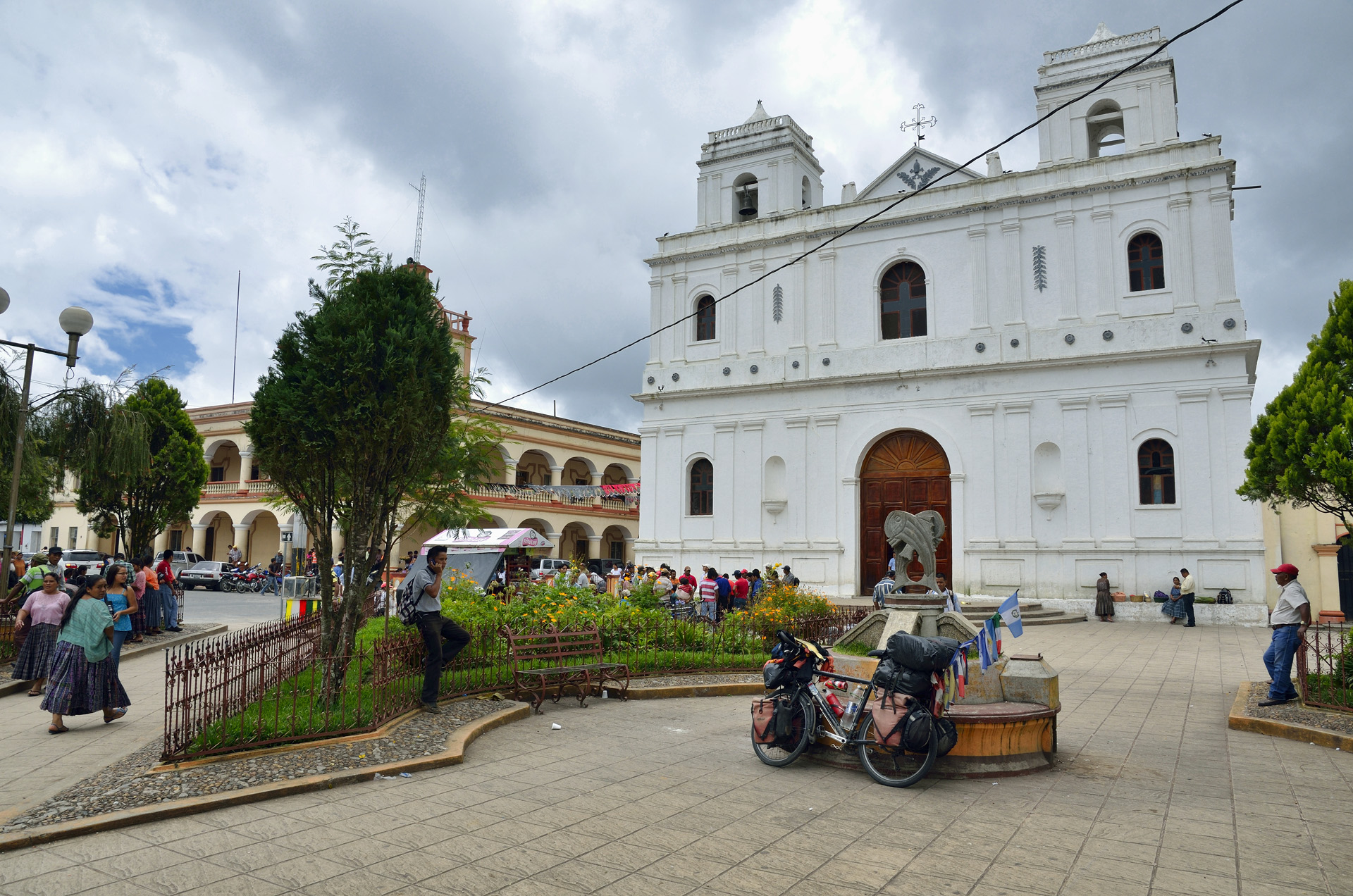
- Church on main square, San Pedro Carchá, 2013

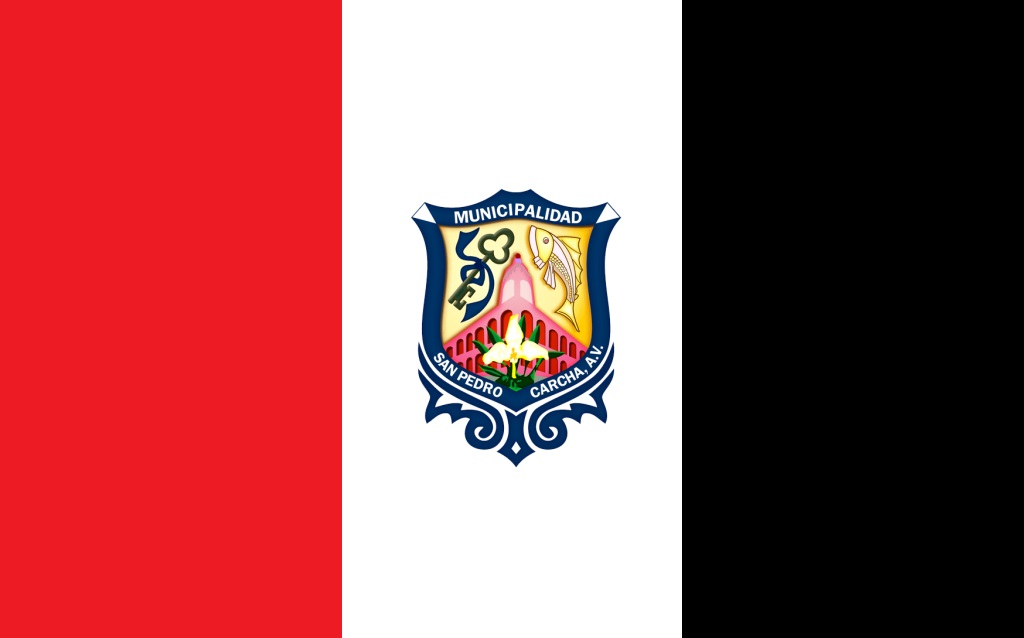
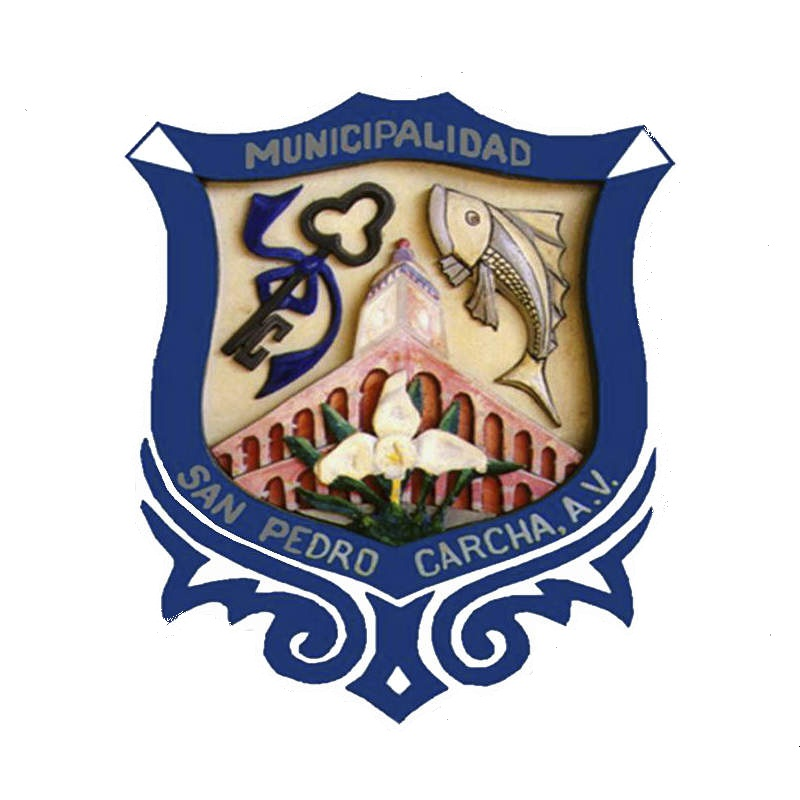
- Flag Coat of arms
- Nickname: Carchá
- Location in Guatemala
- Coordinates: 15°28′38″N 90°18′38″W
- Country: Guatemala
- Department: Alta Verapaz
- Municipality: San Pedro Carchá

Government
  - Type: Municipal
  - Mayor: Víctor Hugo Cifuentes (UNE)

Area
  - Municipality: 1,310 km^{2} (510 sq mi)
- Elevation: 1,282 m (4,206 ft)
- Highest elevation: 2,100 m (6,900 ft)
- Lowest elevation: 600 m (2,000 ft)

Population (Census 2018)
  - Municipality: 235,275
  - Density: 180/km^{2} (465/sq mi)
  - Urban: 16,353
  - Ethnicities: Q'eqchi' Poqomchi' Ladino
  - Religions: Roman Catholicism Evangelicalism Maya
- Climate: Cfb
- Website: municipal site

San Pedro Carchá, usually referred to as Carchá, is a town and a municipality in the Guatemalan department of Alta Verapaz. The municipality covers an area of 1,310 km^{2} (510 sq mi) and is situated at 1,282 m above sea level.

At the 2018 census, the population of the municipality was 235,275 and that of the town of Carchá was 16,353.

== Sports ==
C.S.D. Carchá is a football club that plays their home games at the Estadio Juan Ramon Ponce. They have played in Guatemala's top division from 1998 to 2001.

== Franja Transversal del Norte ==
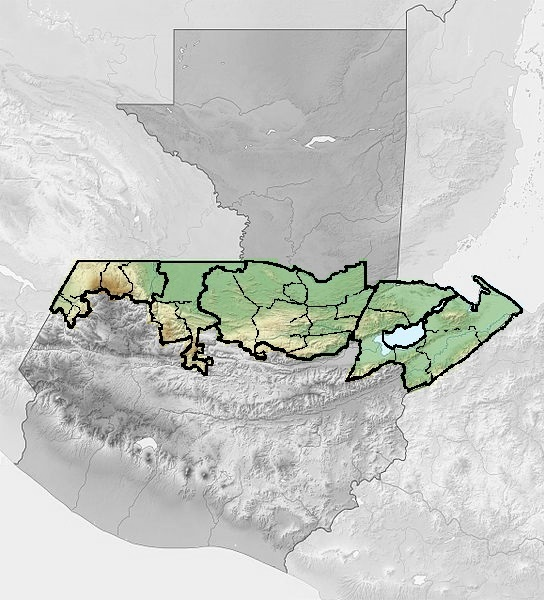
Location of San Pedro Carchá in Franja Transversal del Norte

The Northern Transversal Strip was officially created during the government of General Carlos Arana Osorio in 1970, by Legislative Decree 60–70, for agricultural development. The decree literally said: "It is of public interest and national emergency, the establishment of Agrarian Development Zones in the area included within the municipalities: San Ana Huista, San Antonio Huista, Nentón, Jacaltenango, San Mateo Ixtatán, and Santa Cruz Barillas in Huehuetenango; Chajul and San Miguel Uspantán in Quiché; Cobán, Chisec, San Pedro Carchá, Lanquín, Senahú, Cahabón and Chahal, in Alta Verapaz and the entire department of Izabal."

== Climate ==
San Pedro Carchá has a warm and temperate climate (Köppen: Cfb).

Climate data for San Pedro Carchá
Month	Jan	Feb	Mar	Apr	May	Jun	Jul	Aug	Sep	Oct	Nov	Dec	Year
Daily mean °C (°F)	16.5 (61.7)	17.4 (63.3)	18.7 (65.7)	19.7 (67.5)	20.4 (68.7)	20.4 (68.7)	20.0 (68.0)	20.0 (68.0)	20.0 (68.0)	19.0 (66.2)	18.0 (64.4)	16.9 (62.4)	18.9 (66.1)
Average precipitation mm (inches)	128 (5.0)	99 (3.9)	111 (4.4)	105 (4.1)	183 (7.2)	309 (12.2)	266 (10.5)	238 (9.4)	306 (12.0)	318 (12.5)	235 (9.3)	146 (5.7)	2,444 (96.2)
Source: Climate-Data.org

== Geographic location ==
San Pedro Carchá is completely surrounded by Alta Verapaz department municipalities:

== Notes and references ==
=== Bibliography ===
- Solano, Luis (2012). "Contextualización histórica de la Franja Transversal del Norte (FTN)" (PDF). Centro de Estudios y Documentación de la Frontera Occidental de Guatemala, CEDFOG (in Spanish).
