= Chicamán =

- Municipality

- Location in Guatemala
- Coordinates: 15°20′54″N 90°47′58″W
- Country: Guatemala
- Department: El Quiché
- Municipality: Chicamán
- Established as a municipality: 1984

Government
  - Type: Municipal
  - Mayor: Diego Us (PP)

Area
  - Municipality: 199 sq mi (516 km^{2})
- Elevation: 4,820 ft (1,470 m)
- Highest elevation: 7,306 ft (2,227 m)
- Lowest elevation: 1,601 ft (488 m)

Population (Census 2002)
  - Municipality: 25,280
  - Urban: 1,893
  - Ethnicities: Poqomchi' Uspantek K'iche' K'ekchi Ladino
  - Religions: Eastern Orthodoxy or Oriental Orthodoxy Roman Catholicism Evangelicalism Maya
- Climate: Cfb
- Website: http://www.inforpressca.com/chicamanq/

Chicamán is a municipality in the Guatemalan department of El Quiché.

Tourists may visit the Canyon El Barbudo and the Quatro Chorros waterfalls. Its population in 2023 is 44,728.
