= Cahaboncito River =

Location
- Country: Guatemala

Physical characteristics
- Source
  - location: El Estor

The Cahaboncito River is a river of Guatemala.

== See also ==
- List of rivers of Guatemala
