= Poqomchiʼ people =

Poqomchiʼ
Total population
- 176,622

Regions with significant populations

Languages
- Poqomchiʼ, Spanish

Religion
- Catholic, Evangelicalist, Maya religion

The Poqomchiʼ are a Maya people in Guatemala. Their indigenous language is also called Poqomchiʼ, and is related to the Quichean–Poqom branch. Poqomchí is spoken in Baja Verapaz (Purulhá) and in Alta Verapaz: Santa Cruz Verapaz, San Cristóbal Verapaz, Tactic, Tamahú and Tucurú. It is also spoken in Chicamán (El Quiché).

== History of linguistic description ==
The Poqomchi' language, belonging to the Mayan family, has a rich linguistic history that spans almost five centuries. Despite this long history, it remains one of the least documented languages within the Mayan family. Description efforts began in the second half of the 16th century when Spanish missionaries initiated the first attempts to document the language. These early efforts laid the foundation for understanding the structure and features of Poqomchi'.

Subsequent linguistic descriptions took place in the second half of the 19th century when European travelers and ethnographers made notable contributions. However, it was in the 20th century that linguistic description gained further momentum with the involvement of American and European missionaries who dedicated their efforts to understanding and documenting Poqomchi'.
