= Santa María Cahabón =

Santa María Cahabón Cahabón
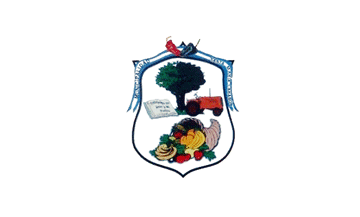
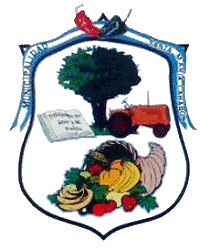
- Flag Coat of arms
- Interactive map of Santa María Cahabón
- Coordinates: 15°36′20″N 89°48′45″W
- Country: Guatemala
- Department: Alta Verapaz
- Municipality: Santa María Cahabón

Government
  - Mayor: Rúben Darío Rosales (UNE)

Area
  - Total: 900 km^{2} (350 sq mi)
- Elevation: 250 m (820 ft)

Population (2005)
  - Total: 31,425
- Time zone: UTC-6
- Climate: Af

Cahabón is a municipality in the Guatemalan department of Alta Verapaz. It lies at an altitude of 250m above sea level and covers an area of 900 km². The population is 31,425. The annual festival is from September 1 to 8.

== Franja Transversal del Norte ==
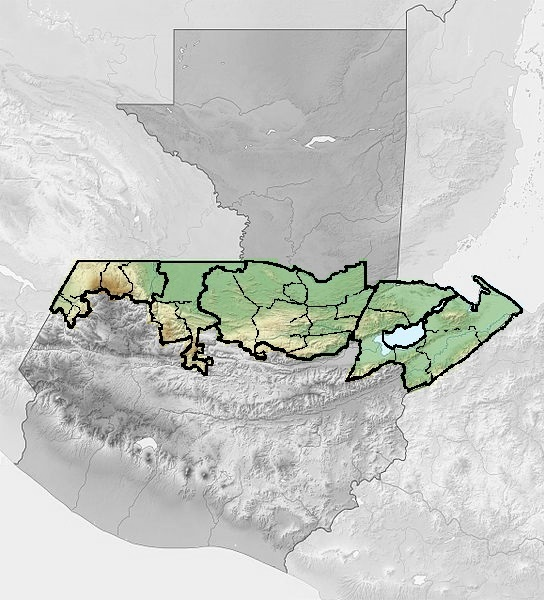
Location of Cahabón in Franja Transversal del Norte

The Northern Transversal Strip was officially created during the government of General Carlos Arana Osorio in 1970, by Legislative Decree 60-70, for agricultural development. The decree literally said: "It is of public interest and national emergency, the establishment of Agrarian Development Zones in the area included within the municipalities: San Ana Huista, San Antonio Huista, Nentón, Jacaltenango, San Mateo Ixtatán, and Santa Cruz Barillas in Huehuetenango; Chajul and San Miguel Uspantán in Quiché; Cobán, Chisec, San Pedro Carchá, Lanquín, Senahú, Cahabón and Chahal, in Alta Verapaz and the entire department of Izabal."

== Climate ==
Cahabón has a tropical climate (Köppen: Af).

Climate data for Cahabón
Month	Jan	Feb	Mar	Apr	May	Jun	Jul	Aug	Sep	Oct	Nov	Dec	Year
Mean daily maximum °C (°F)	27.4 (81.3)	29.3 (84.7)	30.7 (87.3)	32.2 (90.0)	32.1 (89.8)	32.1 (89.8)	30.7 (87.3)	31.0 (87.8)	31.0 (87.8)	30.1 (86.2)	28.5 (83.3)	27.7 (81.9)	30.2 (86.4)
Daily mean °C (°F)	23.4 (74.1)	24.2 (75.6)	25.7 (78.3)	26.8 (80.2)	27.3 (81.1)	27.5 (81.5)	26.7 (80.1)	26.7 (80.1)	26.7 (80.1)	26.0 (78.8)	24.6 (76.3)	23.5 (74.3)	25.8 (78.4)
Mean daily minimum °C (°F)	19.4 (66.9)	19.2 (66.6)	20.7 (69.3)	21.5 (70.7)	22.5 (72.5)	22.9 (73.2)	22.7 (72.9)	22.5 (72.5)	22.4 (72.3)	22.0 (71.6)	20.8 (69.4)	19.4 (66.9)	21.3 (70.4)
Average precipitation mm (inches)	134 (5.3)	75 (3.0)	64 (2.5)	83 (3.3)	146 (5.7)	425 (16.7)	411 (16.2)	269 (10.6)	320 (12.6)	307 (12.1)	189 (7.4)	138 (5.4)	2,561 (100.8)
Source: Climate-Data.org

== See also ==
- Franja Transversal del Norte

== Notes and references ==
=== Bibliography ===
- Solano, Luis (2012). "Contextualización histórica de la Franja Transversal del Norte (FTN)" (PDF). Centro de Estudios y Documentación de la Frontera Occidental de Guatemala, CEDFOG (in Spanish). Archived from the original (PDF) on 13 November 2014.
