= San Antonio Huista =

- Municipality
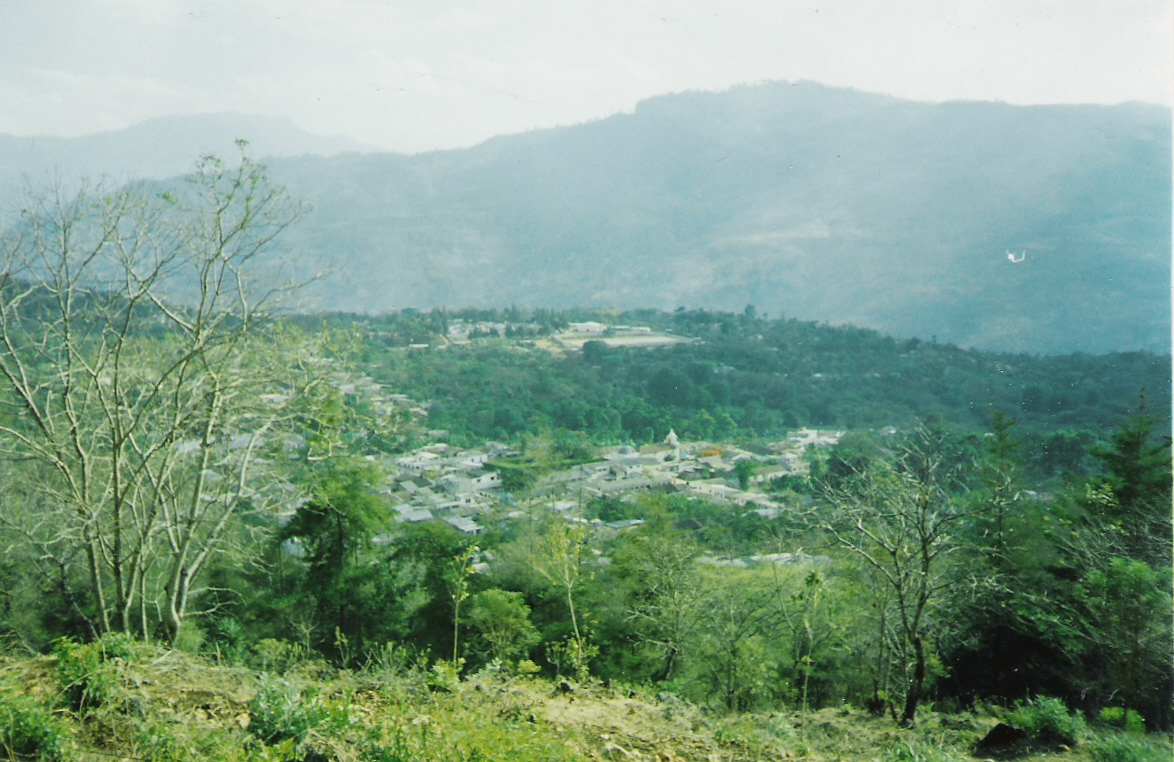

- Location in Guatemala
- Coordinates: 15°39′00″N 91°46′00″W
- Country: Guatemala
- Department: Huehuetenango

Area
  - Municipality: 60.4 km^{2} (23.3 sq mi)

Population (2018 census)
  - Municipality: 16,697
  - Density: 276/km^{2} (716/sq mi)
  - Urban: 6,132
- Climate: Cwb

San Antonio Huista is a town and municipality in the Guatemalan department of Huehuetenango. It is located 362 kilometers from Guatemala City. The predominant language is Spanish, while approximately 20% of the population speak indigenous languages, the majority speaking Mam. The municipality of San Antonio Huista is situated at 1240 metres above sea level, with a population of 16,697 (2018 census). It covers an area of 60.4 km^{2}. The annual festival is December 8–12 dedicated to the Virgin of Guadalupe and the patron saint's day (Saint Anthony of Padua) is celebrated June 11–13.
