= Polochic River =

Polochic river

Location
- Country: Guatemala
- Departments: Alta Verapaz and Izabal

Physical characteristics
- Mouth
  - location: Lake Izabal
  - elevation: 88 m (289 ft)
- Length: 194 km (121 mi)
- Discharge
  - average: 69.3 m^{3}/s (2,450 cu ft/s) (at Telemán)

Basin features
- Tributaries
  - left: Río Papalja, Río Tampoma, Río Actela, Río Boca Nueva, Río Secoc, Río Cahabón.
  - right: Río Matanzas, Rio Jolomjix, Rio Chiquito, Rio Zarco.

The Polochic River (Spanish pronunciation: [poloˈtʃik]) is a 194-kilometre-long (121 mi) river in eastern Guatemala. The 194 kilometers long river flows eastwards through a deep valley and flows into Lake Izabal at 15.46667°N 89.36667°W. The river is navigable for 30 kilometres (19 mi) to Panzós. It was used many years ago to transport coffee and timber, but most commercial transport in the river valley is now carried out overland, by trucks.
