= Tamahú =

- San Pablo Tamahú
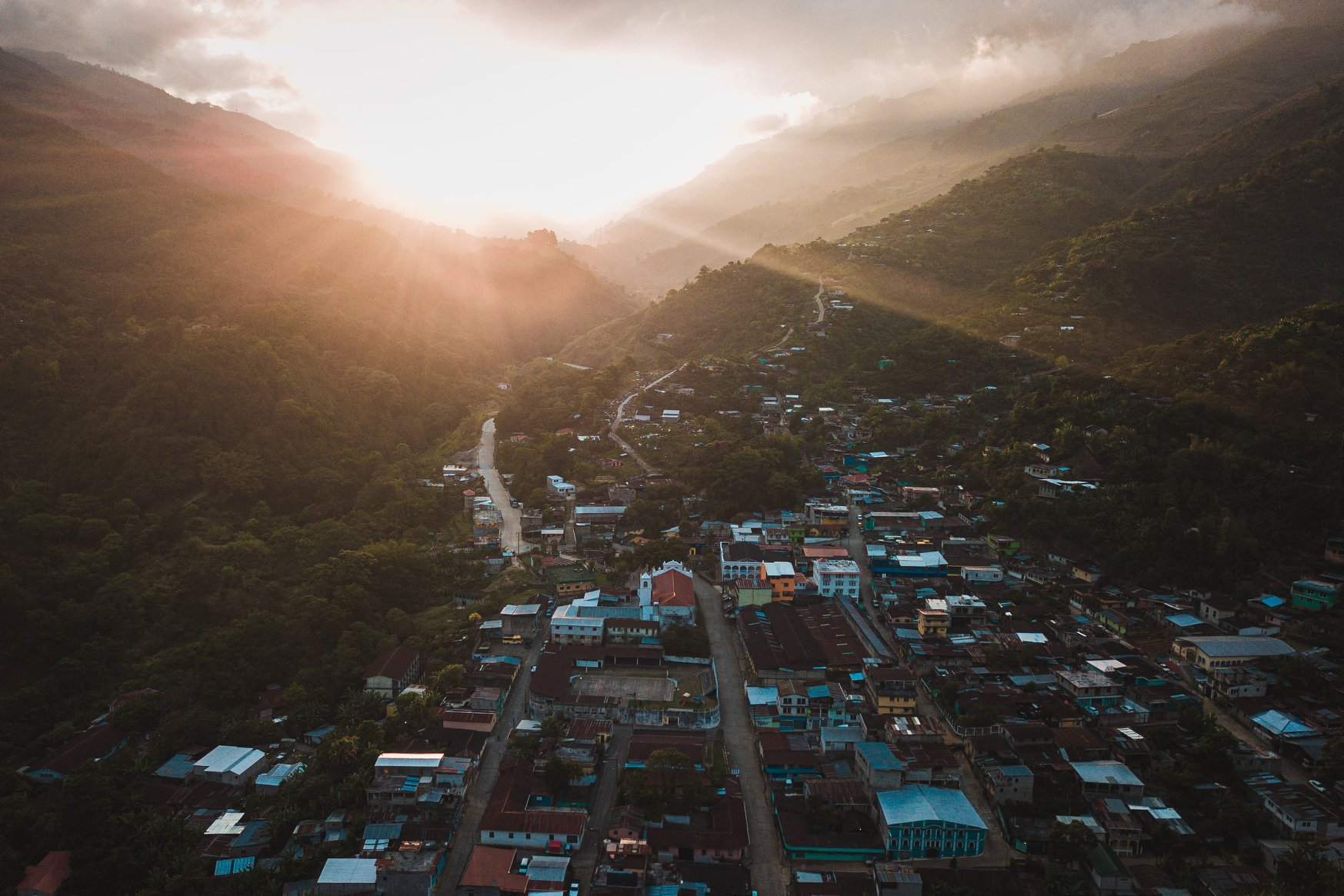

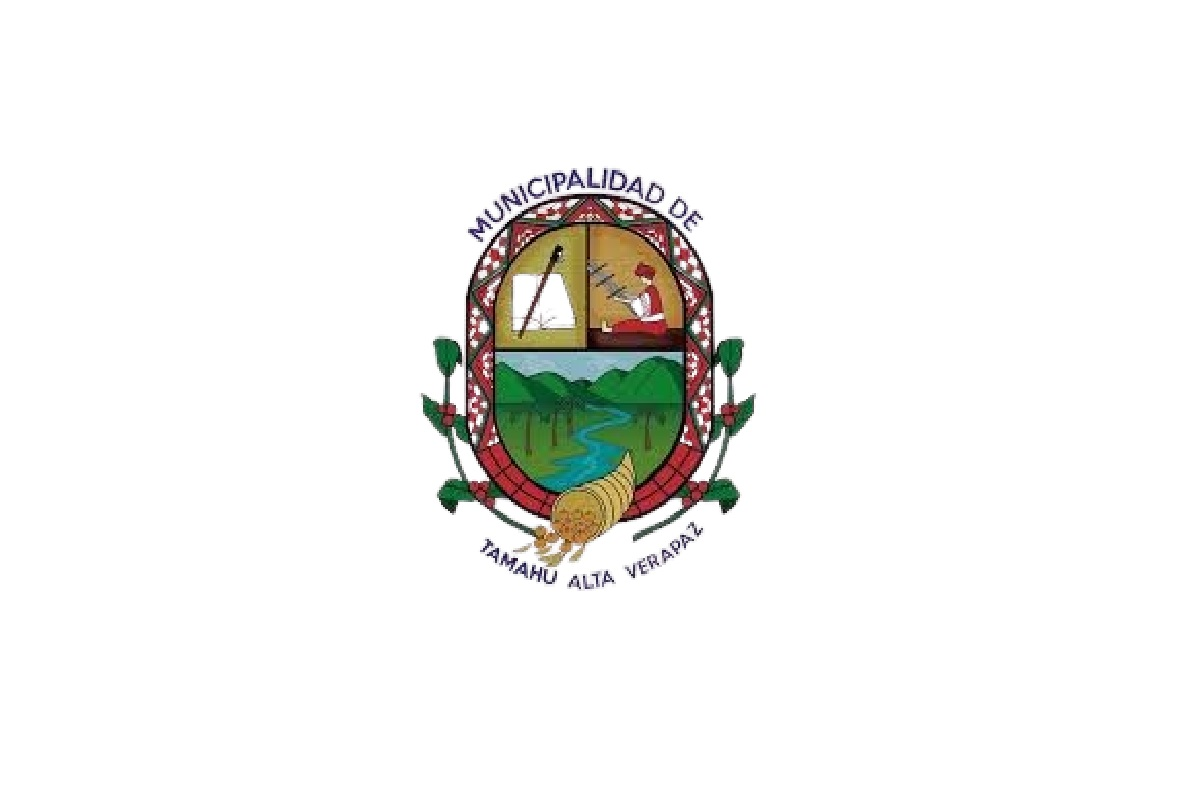
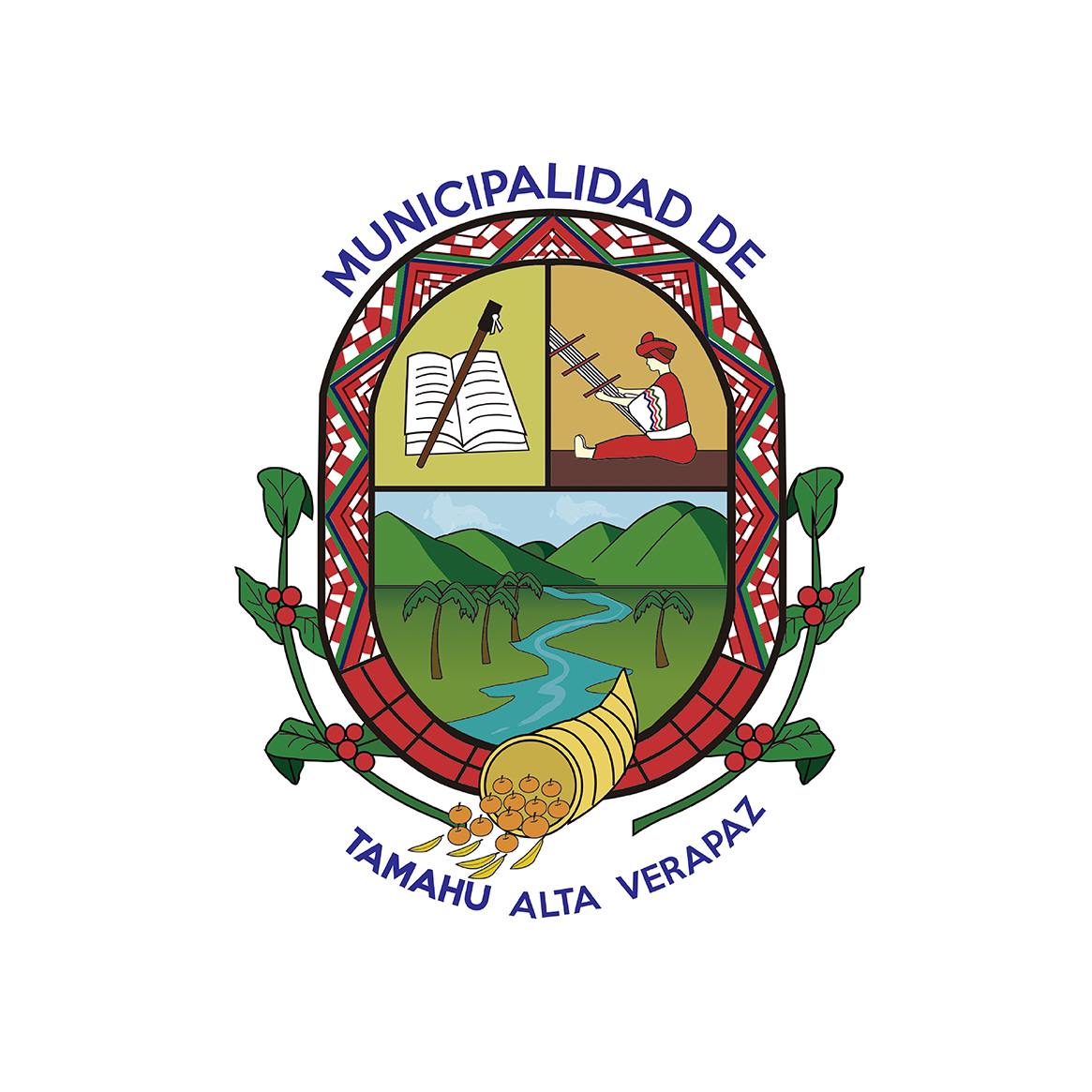
- Flag Seal

- Location within Guatemala
- Coordinates: 15°18′25″N 90°14′3″W
- Country: Guatemala
- Department: Alta Verapaz

Population
  - Total: 24,444
- Climate: Af

Tamahú is a municipality in the Guatemalan department of Alta Verapaz.

== History ==
Tamahú was established on 7 December 1574 by friars Francisco de Viana, Lucas Gallego and Fray Guillermo.

One of the most powerful German families that settled in the region by the end of the 19th century was the Thomae family, who had their headquarters in neighbor Purulhá. Mauricio Thomae's early farmland were the following haciendas:

Year	Hacienda	Location
1882	Cubilgüitz	Cobán
1889	San Isidro	Purulhá
1897	Comija	Tamahú
1897	Popabaj	Tucurú
1900	Nueve Aguas	Purulhá
1902	Panzal	Purulhá
1902	Rocjá	Tamahú
1902	Paijá	Tucurú
1905	Chimox	Tucurú

Years later, during Jorge Ubico's presidency (1931-1944), Thomae went on to become one of the most influential landlords in the German Verapaz, along with the Sarg, Sapper and Diesseldorf families. Ubico had been governor of Cobán during Manuel Estrada Cabrera 22-year regime and befriended several German families, including the Thomaes.

== Climate ==
Tamahú has a tropical rainforest climate (Köppen: Af).

Climate data for Tamahú
Month	Jan	Feb	Mar	Apr	May	Jun	Jul	Aug	Sep	Oct	Nov	Dec	Year
Mean daily maximum °C (°F)	24.4 (75.9)	25.7 (78.3)	27.1 (80.8)	28.1 (82.6)	28.0 (82.4)	26.2 (79.2)	26.7 (80.1)	26.5 (79.7)	25.8 (78.4)	24.8 (76.6)	24.2 (75.6)	20.9 (69.6)	25.7 (78.3)
Daily mean °C (°F)	18.6 (65.5)	19.4 (66.9)	20.9 (69.6)	22.1 (71.8)	22.5 (72.5)	22.3 (72.1)	21.8 (71.2)	21.9 (71.4)	21.8 (71.2)	21.1 (70.0)	20.0 (68.0)	18.9 (66.0)	20.9 (69.7)
Mean daily minimum °C (°F)	12.8 (55.0)	13.1 (55.6)	14.8 (58.6)	16.1 (61.0)	17.0 (62.6)	17.8 (64.0)	17.5 (63.5)	17.2 (63.0)	17.1 (62.8)	16.4 (61.5)	15.2 (59.4)	13.7 (56.7)	15.7 (60.3)
Average precipitation mm (inches)	84 (3.3)	68 (2.7)	67 (2.6)	77 (3.0)	189 (7.4)	393 (15.5)	361 (14.2)	269 (10.6)	371 (14.6)	279 (11.0)	145 (5.7)	91 (3.6)	2,394 (94.2)
Source: Climate-Data.org

== Geographic location ==
Tamahú is practically surrounded by Alta Verapaz Department municipalities:
