= List of caves in Guatemala =

This is a list of caves of Guatemala and their general location.

- Actún Can Cave in Flores, El Petén
- B'onb'il Pek Cave in Chisec, Alta Verapaz
- Chicoy Cave in Purulhá, Baja Verapaz
- Candelaria Caves in Chisec, Alta Verapaz
- Ixobel Cave in Poptún, El Petén
- Jobitzinaj Cave in Flores, El Petén
- K'an Ba Cave in Lanquín, Alta Verapaz
- Grutas de Lanquín in Lanquín, Alta Verapaz
- Las Minas Cave in Esquipulas, Chiquimula
- Naj Tunich in Poptún, El Petén
- Grutas del Rey San Marcos in San Juan Chamelco, Alta Verapaz
- Cuevas del Silvino in Morales, Izabal
- Grutas de Uaxactún in El Petén

== See also ==
- List of caves
- Speleology
