= Rodolfo Narciso Chavarría =

Guatemalan musician (1901–1968)

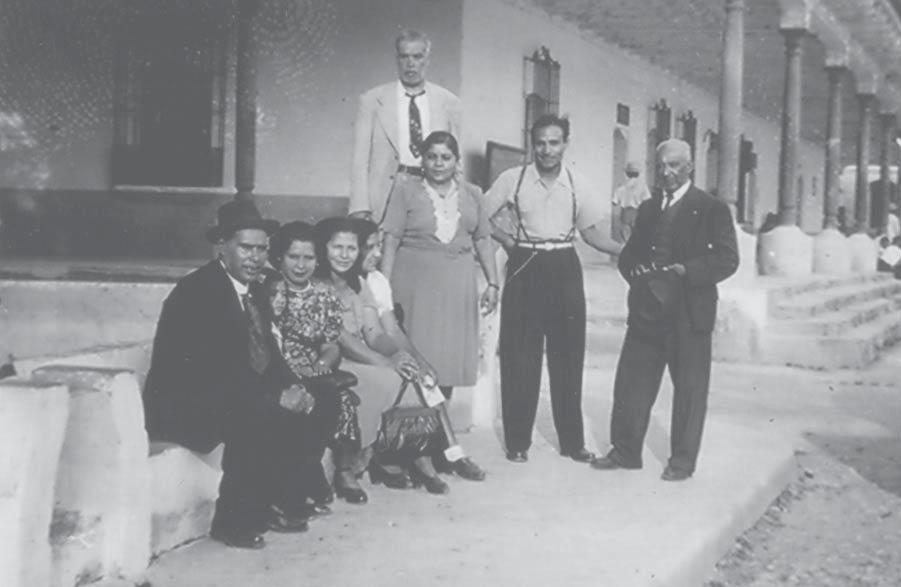
- Narciso Chavarría brothers and their families in 1947; Rodolfo Narciso is standing behind the group. (Note: From left to right: musician and writer Victoriano de Jesús Narciso Chavarría -also known as "Don Toyano", with the magic fingers for piano- who is next to his wife and several friends.)

Background information
- Born: March 4, 1901
- Died: October 3, 1968 (aged 67)
- Occupations: Musician composer
- Instrument: Marimba

Rodolfo Narciso Chavarría (4 March 1901- 3 October 1968) was a marimba player and composer from Guatemala.

== Biography ==
He was born in the city of San Cristóbal Verapaz, and his parents were Vicente Adolfo Narciso Peláez and Gudelia Chavarría.

He attended the Public Elementary school at his home town, and started his musical studies along with his brother Victoriano with their father, and then attended classes with professor Adolfo Tercero Paz. Having perfected his marimba skills, he played mainly in Cobán, Petén and Belice in the 1920s. At his 20 years of age he had already several compositions of his own.

He was also a public servant, being Panzós mayor in 1935 and municipal secretary in Cobán, Tactic, San Juan Chamelco and his native San Cristóbal Verapaz. He worked in the Guatemala Post Office central in Guatemala City, in radio Morse, and was manager of the I.D. department in the Guatemala City municipality.

== Death ==
Narciso Chavarría died on 3 October 1968 and he was buried in the cemetery of San Cristóbal Verapaz, next to his mother, brothers and wife.

== Compositions ==
He is well known for his compositions for marimba in both the Alta Verapaz and Quetzaltenango Departments. He also composed mass and funeral pieces.

His composition Ruiseñor Verapaz has a piccolo solo whose skills and virtuoso rivals those of Clarineros, Fiesta de pájaros of Jesús Castillo and Ave Lira of Luis Delfino Bethancourt. Narciso Chavarría was a close friend of his colleague Domingo Bethancourt, to whom he dedicated his compositions Corazón voluntario (English: Voluntary Heart) and Chimax. These two pieces were widely distributed in Quetzaltenango thru Radio TGQ by Bethancourt and his «Marimba Ideal». Rodolfo Narciso Narciso Chavarría was an extremely prolific composer, who wrote more than two hundred and seventy pieces in his catalog. Having loved his native Alta Verapaz Department, he spent the last years of his life in the Polochic River valley which inspired him his famous fox-blues Río Polochic.

- Río Polochic, fox-blues
- Ruiseñor Verapaz, capriccio
- Reflejos de luna en el lago, concert waltz
- Josecito, guarimba
- Gilberto Leal, pasodoble
- Tezulutlán, blues
- Clavel tinto, foxtrot
- Corazón voluntario, march (1938)
- Chimax, march (Op. No. 278, 1946)
- Garza de la mañana (Op. 289,1945)

== See also ==
- San Cristóbal Verapaz
