= Verapaz =

Verapaz (or Vera Paz) may refer to the following places and jurisdictions :

- Verapaz, Guatemala, a region of colonial Guatemala, now divided into :
  - Baja Verapaz Department, with its capital at Salamá
  - Alta Verapaz Department, with its capital at Cobán
  - and Roman Catholic Diocese of Vera Paz, with see in the above Cobán, covering both
- Verapaz, El Salvador, a municipality in El Salvador

== See also ==
- San Cristóbal Verapaz, a municipality in Alta Verapaz, Guatemala
- Santa Cruz Verapaz, a municipality in Alta Verapaz, Guatemala
