= Cahabón River =

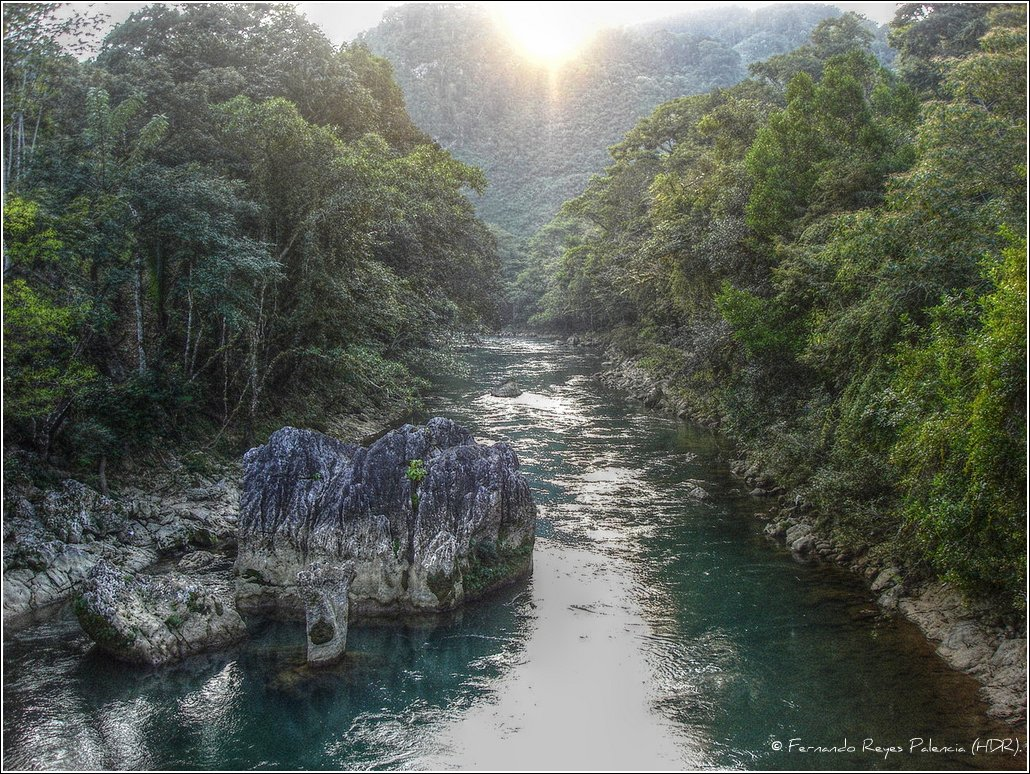
- Cahabón River
- Native name: Río Cahabón (Spanish)

Location
- Country: Guatemala

Physical characteristics
- Source: Tactic, Guatemala
  - coordinates: 15.321549°N 90.338169°W
  - elevation: 1,600 m (5,200 ft)
- Mouth: Polochic River
  - coordinates: 15.422463°N 89°W
  - elevation: 90 m (300 ft)
- Length: 195.95 km (121.76 mi)
- Basin size: 2,459 km^{2} (949 sq mi)
- Discharge
  - average: 164.2 m^{3}/s (5,800 cu ft/s)

The Río Cahabón (Cahabón River) is a 196-kilometre-long (122 mi) river in eastern Guatemala. From its sources in the Sierra de las Minas mountain range in Baja Verapaz it turns north and then east into Alta Verapaz, flowing through Santa Cruz Verapaz, Tactic, Cobán, San Pedro Carchá, Semuc Champey and Santa María Cahabón below which it joins the smaller Polochic River.

The Cahabón has whitewater reaches, with Class III and IV rapids — intermediate to challenging — which are favoured spots for touristic river rafting.

In 1980-82, massacres of local populations by the military around the construction site of the Oxec II hydroelectric plant created the belief that it had been orchestrated to clear the area for the construction. The goal of the first dams along the Río Cahabón was to limit natural disasters systematically happening downriver.

The Renace hydroelectric plants (built and owned by ACS Group) leave portions of the river dry, leading local populations (mainly Qʼeqchiʼ people) to open procedures to dismantle the plants.

== See also ==
- Lake Chichoj
