= CSD Chamelco =

Association football club in Guatemala

Chamelco
- Full name: Club Social y Deportivo Chamelco
- Nickname(s): Los Caciques Reales (The Royal Tribe Leaders)
- Founded: 2015
- Ground: Romeo Lucas García; San Juan Chamelco, Alta Verapaz Department, Guatemala
- Capacity: 1,000
- Manager: (Guatemala) Jenner López
- League: Tercera División de Ascenso
- Website: https://m.facebook.com/CSDCHAMELCO/?_rdc=1&refsrc=https%3A%2F%2Fmobile.facebook.com%2FCSDCHAMELCO%2F
Home colours	Away colours

Club Social y Deportivo Chamelco is a Guatemalan football club from San Juan Chamelco, Alta Verapaz Department. It was founded in 2015 and currently plays on the Tercera División de Ascenso.
