= Lake Chichoj =

Lake in Guatemala

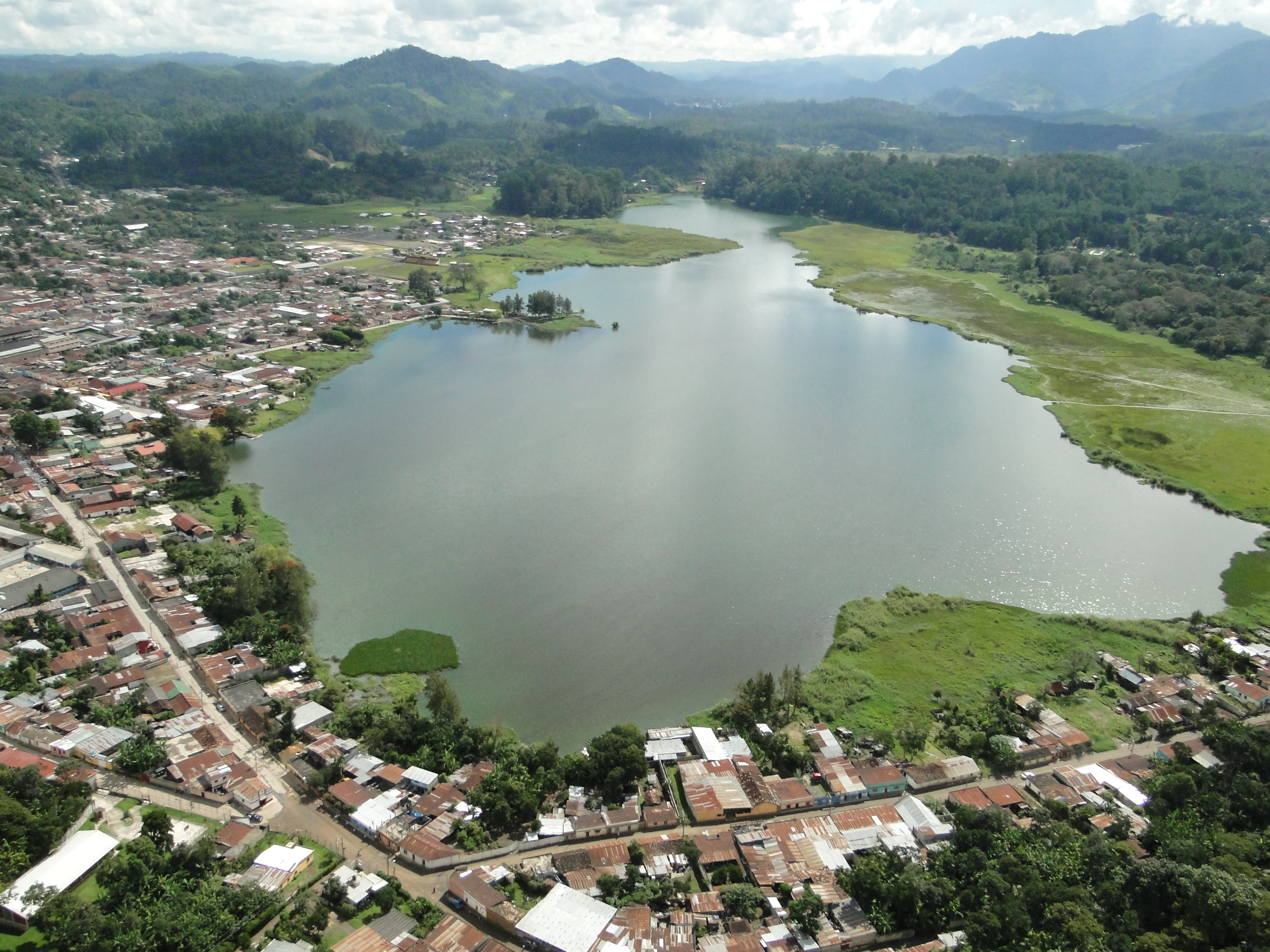

- Location within Guatemala
- Location: San Cristóbal Verapaz, Alta Verapaz Department
- Coordinates: 15°21′30″N 90°28′40″W
- Basin countries: Guatemala
- Surface area: 0.5 km^{2} (0.19 sq mi)
- Surface elevation: 1,393 m (4,570 ft)

Lake Chichoj is located near the city of San Cristóbal Verapaz, in the department of Alta Verapaz, in Guatemala. It is 1 km (0.62 mi) long, 0.5 km (0.31 mi) wide, with an area of 0.5 km^{2} (0.19 sq mi), an average water volume of (4.8±0.1)×10^{6} m^{3} [(1.7±0.04)×10^{8} ft^{3}], and a maximum depth of 32 m (105 ft).

== Location and catchment ==
Lake Chichoj is located in the municipality of San Cristóbal Verapaz, department of Alta Verapaz, in Guatemala. The catchment of lake has been designated as a Protected Area, in an attempt to protect the lake from environmental degradation. Water routing through the catchment is made complex by karstic groundwater flow. It is estimated that the catchment of the lake drains 21.0–23.5 km^{2} (8.1–9.1 sq mi). The lake in turn drains superficially to the Cahabón River, which flows to the Atlantic Ocean via Lake Izabal.

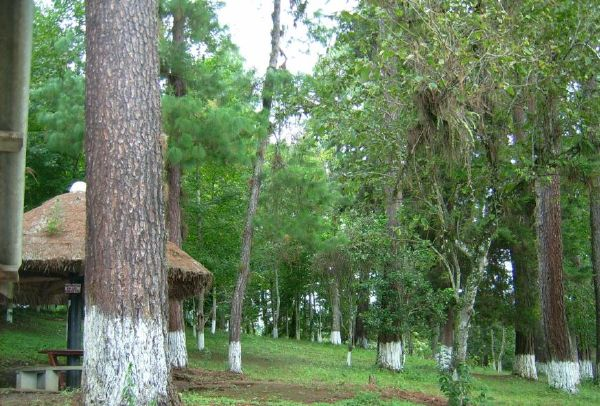
The Peténcito Hill, located along the northern shoreline of the lake, hosts a pleasant park.

== Legends surrounding the catastrophic formation of the lake ==
According to a few oral traditions from San Cristóbal Verapaz, the lake would have formed catastrophically by ground collapse during an earthquake in the early 16th Century, soon after the arrival of the Dominican friars (around 1525 CE), engulfing a church and its surrounding Maya settlement. The cataclysm has been explained as a divine punishment imparted to the inhabitants of San Cristóbal Caccoh, following the expulsion of a Dominican friar and the refusal of the inhabitants to submit to the Christian faith. This tradition is echoed in a book published in 1648 CE by the Irish Dominican friar Thomas Gage: "The English-American, or a New Survey of the West Indies". Gage's book suffers many exaggerations, casting doubt on the validity of his testimony. However, an independent report by Spanish Dominicans also mentions the sudden formation of a lake near San Cristóbal, by cave collapse, during an earthquake in 1590 CE. The parochial church suffered little damage during that earthquake. The most serious report therefore suggests that the purported event would have taken place far enough from the city for the church not to be damaged, but still would have been large enough to be deemed to reported. The event did not affect the western part of the lake, which was already in existence since at least the 8th Century. Montero de Miranda wrote about the lake that by 1575 (UNAM, 1982: 223–248) it was a "very large, long and very deep lake".

== Hydrology ==
Lake surface temperatures fluctuate between 20 °C (68 °F) in winter, and 25 °C (77 °F) in summer. From 1979 to 2011 annual rainfall was 1,777 mm/a (70.0 in/year) at the lake, and 2,428 mm/a (95.6 in/year) at Cerro La Laguna, the highest part of the catchment. The residence time of water in the lake is therefore 35 ± 6 days assuming homogeneous water mixing. In actuality the lake is strongly stratified and dimictic, being composed of a highly turbid and poorly mineralized epilimnion, over a 5 °C cooler, highly mineralized hypolimnion. Most of the water therefore only restrict its circulation to the epilimnion, with an average residence time of 18 ± 3 days, assuming a constant mean depth of the termocline of 7 m (23 ft). The lake usually homogenizes in January or February, sometimes very rapidly.

The lake is fed by several streams, most noticeably by the Paná River in the west, which is born from the junction of Chijuljá and Requenzal creeks. Other streams (Los Lavaderos, Chicojgual, Cerro Caj Coj) contribute very little to the lake water budget. Some springs feed the lake either directly near the shoreline (for example near Panconsul cave), or through the extensive marshlands that surround the lake. Lake Chichoj drains to Río El Desagüe, a tributary of the Cahabón River, which it joins after sinking into a cave for several hundreds of meters. Some of the sewage of San Cristál Verapaz is rerouted away from the lake and flows in a pipe through the marshlands before being emptied into Río El Desagüe, downstream of lake Chichoj.

The lake results from the coalescence of at least three dolines, likely resulting from the dissolution of gypsum at depth. The occurrence of gypsum is evidenced by a cluster of sulfate-bearing springs that dot the active trace of the Chixoy Polochic fault, 2 km south of the lake in the chixoy river valley, where they form large travertine fans. Discharge at these springs is much larger than what their upslope catchments can provide. The catchment of Lake Chichój is the closest catchment susceptible to provide water to these springs, and it lies 400–700 m (1,300–2,300 ft) above the springs.

== Ecological succession, eutrophication and shrinking of lake Chichoj ==
Eutrophication can occur naturally, during the late stage of the natural ecological succession that accompanies the infilling of a lake. It then develops slowly, over thousands of years. It develops within only a few decades when triggered by cropland fertilization, industrial contamination, or urban development. Deforestation, land fertilization, urbanization and industrialization in the catchment of lake Chichoj are all thought to have contributed in a way or the other to the massive lake contamination and eutrophication of the lake that has taken place since the 1950s. Degradation of its ecosystem motivated environmental studies starting in the 1970s. They aimed at documenting the eutrophication process, and at identifying its causes. Most concluded that the main source of eutrophication is the absence of treatment of city waste waters, rather than agriculture.

The most visible consequence of eutrophication is the massive development of large floating rafts of the water hyacinth (Eichhornia crassipes), which is untiringly harvested to prevent complete invasion of the lake open waters. The enormous amount of hyacinth removed from the lake is then composted to produce a horticultural fertilizer.

Many local witnesses have reported that the extensive marshes that surround the lake were open waters in the 1950s. The presence of a well marked shoreline 1.0 ± 0.1 to 1.4 ± 0.1 m above the average current lake level and surrounding the marshes supports these testimonies. Because eutrophication leads to rapid infilling of lakes by plant debris, and conversion of open waters to marshland, it has been hypothesized that eutrophication is responsible for the reduction in the lake surface.

Due to its location halfway between the Atlantic and Pacific Ocean, the lake ecosystem is normally influenced by the Pacific El Niño Oscillation (ENSO) and the North Atlantic Oscillation. Studies are under way to determine the sensitivity of the lake hydrology to these oscillations over the past millennium.

== Chromium contamination ==
Contamination of the lake environment by chromium started in the 1950s, and has increased dramatically until at least 2005, reaching 20 times natural background levels. It originates in industrial activities that involve leather tanning in the shoe factory of Calzado Cobán. The chromium does not seem to accumulate along the food chain, as it is not found in fishes and crayfishes. However, it accumulates massively in water hyacinth roots and, from there, is transferred to lake sediments through shedding of roots to the lake floor. Most of the water hyacinth biomass is actually extracted from the lake to fight eutrophication and turned into horticultural fertilizer.

== Forest cover reduction ==
Only 20.35% of the catchment of the lake is covered by forest.

Demographic growth and lack of employment are some of the factors that have promoted conversion of forested areas into subsistence agriculture, especially following the coffee price crisis.

The loss of forest cover is particularly critical on steep terrains, which are most susceptible to overland flow and erosion. Soil loss results in siltation farther downslope, as well as in streams and in the lake. It also decreases water recharge of the deep aquifers.

== Seismic hazard ==
Lake Chichoj is located within 2 km of the Chixoy-Polochic fault, a major fault of the North America-Caribbean plate boundary, which constitutes the closest and largest seismic hazard for San Cristóbal Verapaz, but lies within a broader array of large to intermediate seismogenic faults. The latest noticeable earthquakes include a M 4.1 quake in 2006 on the Polochic fault and a M4.8 in June 2009 on a secondary fault, NW of the lake. The sediments of the lake host a rich record of disruptions produced by past earthquakes, most notably the M 7.8 February 4th 1978 earthquake on the Motagua fault as well as a series of older M 7 earthquakes along the Polochic fault between 850 CE and 1450 CE. The lake adds hazard to the ground shaking of earthquakes. The low-lying marshlands that surround the lake are increasingly filled and urbanized. They are susceptible to seismic wave amplification, seismic wave refraction, and soil liquefaction during earthquakes, but also susceptible to flooding during earthquakes if the lake spillovers. Large waves can be produced during earthquakes, either as a result of landslides affecting the lake inner slopes, or by seismic resonance (seiche waves).

== Ground collapse ==
Various geologic data suggest that Lake Chichoj stretches above of a body of gypsum well exposed on outcrops farther west. There, gypsum dissolution is responsible for repeated mountain flank collapses in the valley of Los Chorros. The lake occupies at least three coalescing dolines likely formed by dissolution of gypsum at depth. The dolines are probably only a few tens of thousands of years old, and the marshlands that surround the lake are likely covering similar, sediment-filled dolines. They are therefore susceptible to resumption of ground subsidence, if gypsum keeps dissolving at depth. The new phase of subsidence could either be slow and continuous, or pulsed, and possibly fast, even instantaneous. It is even possible that the marshes are actively subsiding, since no monitoring of subsidence has ever been undertaken. Subsidence might also be occurring under the combined effect of slow sediment compaction and oxidation/decomposition of the organic matter trapped in the sediments. The accommodation space created by the subsidence would be filled by mineral and organic sediments over the marshlands.

== Floods ==
The wetlands that surround the lake spread over an area of 0.63 km^{2}, and are enclosed into an ancient shoreline. The origin of this larger open water lake remains unclear. If the lake level has remained stable, then the reduction in lake size is solely due to the conversion of these open waters into wetlands. Alternatively, lake shrinking might reflect a slight lowering of the average lake level, possibly due to a more efficient drainage at the lake outlet. In any case, it cannot be excluded that the lake level reverts in the future to its ancient stand, flooding areas that have now been filled and urbanized. Besides, the outlet drains to a cave that might get partially of completely obstructed by debris following large storms. Water ponding upstream of the cave could result in an increase in the lake level of 4,0 ± 0,3 m before surface overflow is achieved near the cave.
