= Lanquin Church =

Church in Lanquin, Guatemala

Coordinates: 15°34′23.8″N 89°58′30.9″W

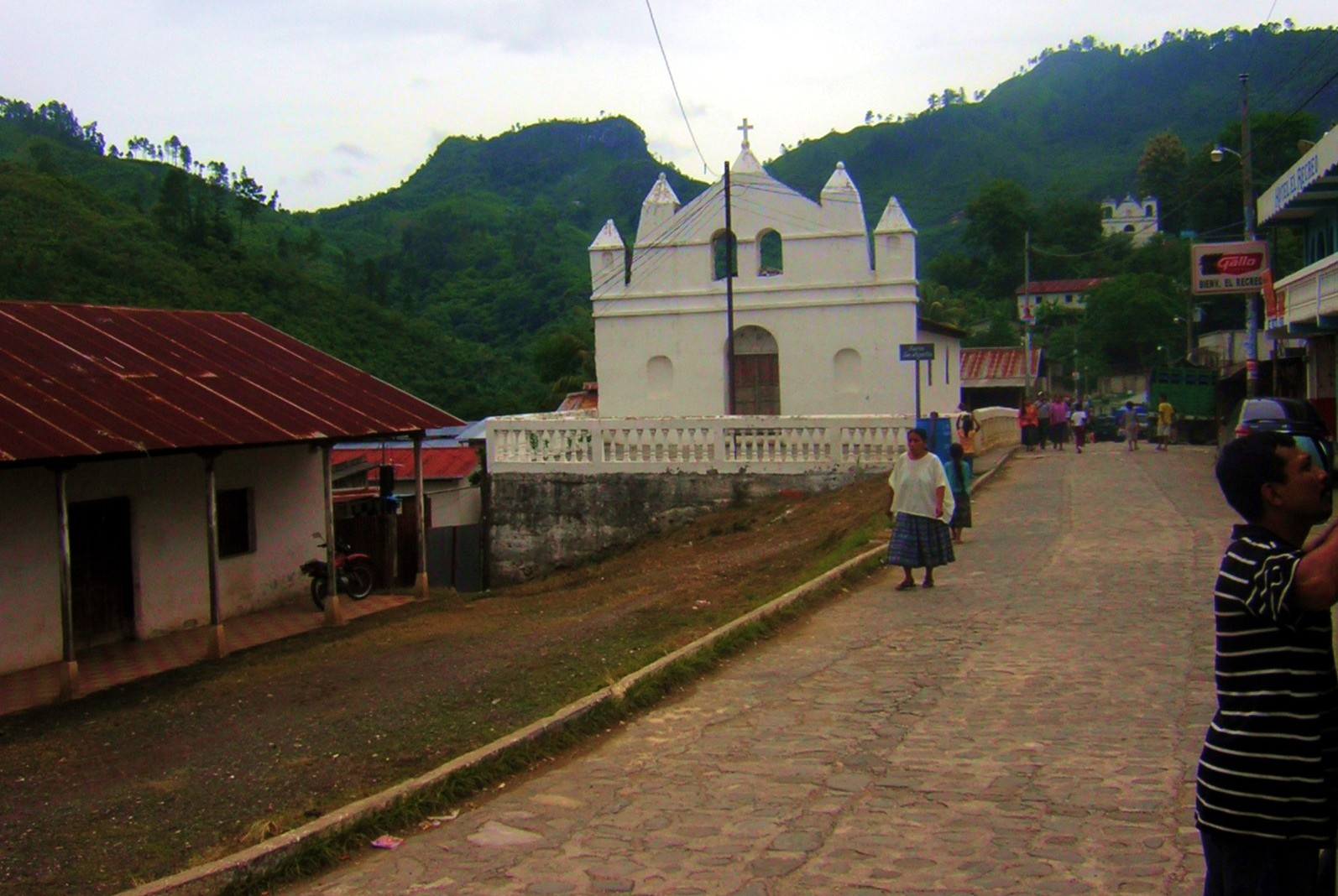
Lanquin church

Lanquin Church or Iglésia de Lanquin is a Roman Catholic church in Lanquin, Guatemala. The church is noted for its fine imagery and silverware.
