= Raxruhá =

- Municipality
- Location in Guatemala Location in Alta Verapaz
- Coordinates: 15°51′59.584″N 90°2′32.719″W
- Country: Guatemala
- Department: Alta Verapaz
- Municipality: Raxruhá

Government
  - Type: Municipal
  - Mayor: Rigoberto Corleto (UNE)

Area
  - Land: 571 km^{2} (220 sq mi)

Population (2018 census)
  - Municipality: 36,832
  - Density: 65/km^{2} (170/sq mi)
  - Urban: 6,038
  - Ethnicities: Q'eqchi' Ladino
  - Religions: Roman Catholicism Evangelicalism Maya
- Climate: Af

Raxruhá is a town and municipality in the north of the Guatemalan department of Alta Verapaz. The municipality, which was formerly a part of Chisec, was founded in 2008. At the 2018 census, the municipality population was 36,832.

== History ==
=== Franja Transversal del Norte ===
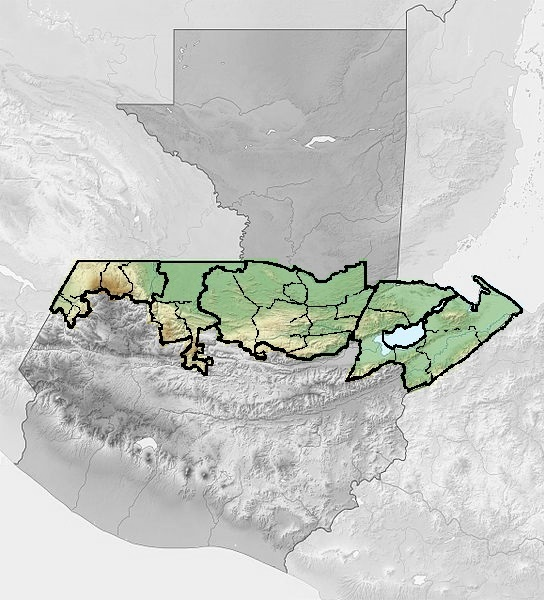
Location of Raxruhá in Franja Transversal del Norte

The Northern Transversal Strip was officially created during the government of General Carlos Arana Osorio in 1970, by Legislative Decree 60-70, for agricultural development. The decree literally said: "It is of public interest and national emergency, the establishment of Agrarian Development Zones in the area included within the municipalities: San Ana Huista, San Antonio Huista, Nentón, Jacaltenango, San Mateo Ixtatán, and Santa Cruz Barillas in Huehuetenango; Chajul and San Miguel Uspantán in Quiché; Cobán, Chisec -whom Raxruhá belonged at the time-, San Pedro Carchá, Lanquín, Senahú, Cahabón and Chahal, in Alta Verapaz and the entire department of Izabal."

=== Municipality formation ===
The municipality of Raxruhá was formed in 2008, from territory that once belonged to Chisec municipality.

== Tourism ==
Raxruhá's main tourist attraction are the Candelaria Caves, which consist of a large system of natural cave formations at the transition between low land and mountainside between Chisec and Raxruhá municipalities. The caves are famous not only for their natural beauty but for the significance they had for the Mayan culture.

Candelaria caves

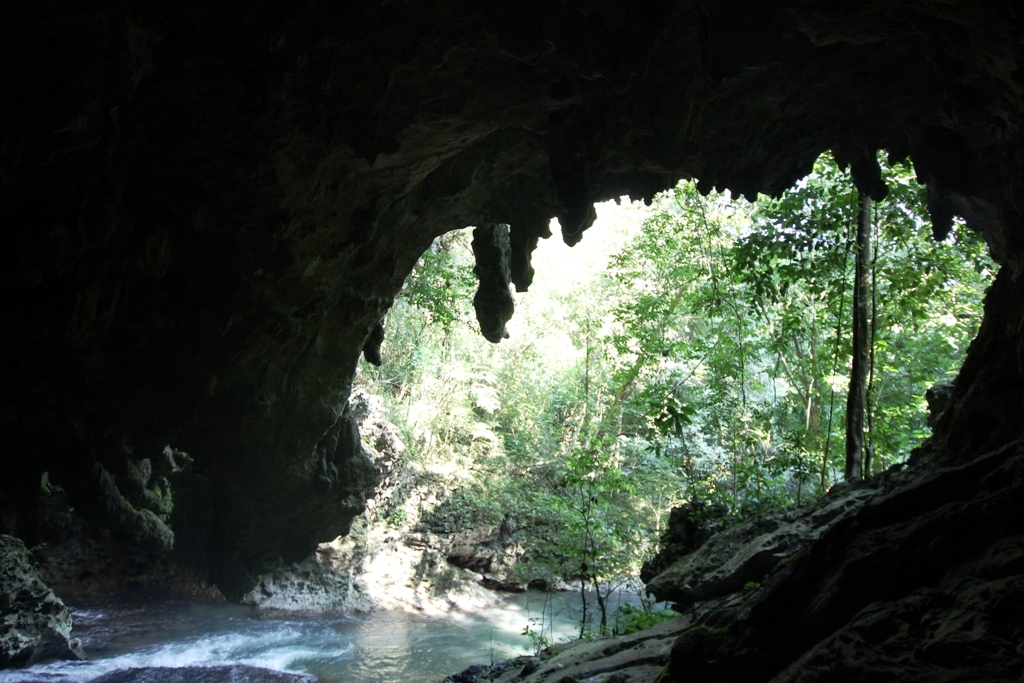
Underground Candelaria river.

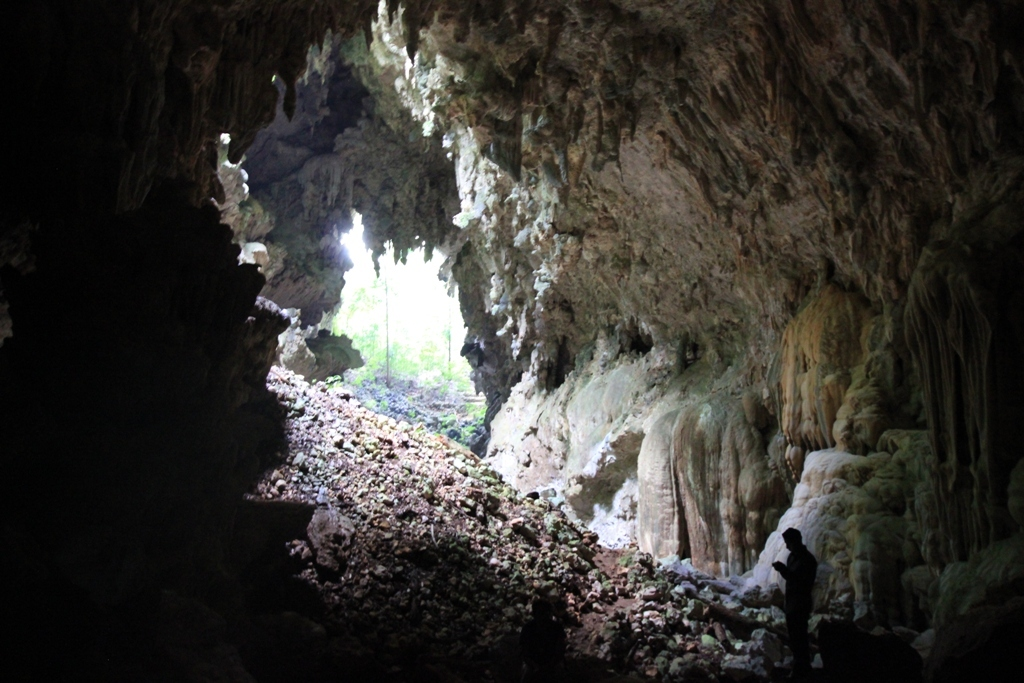

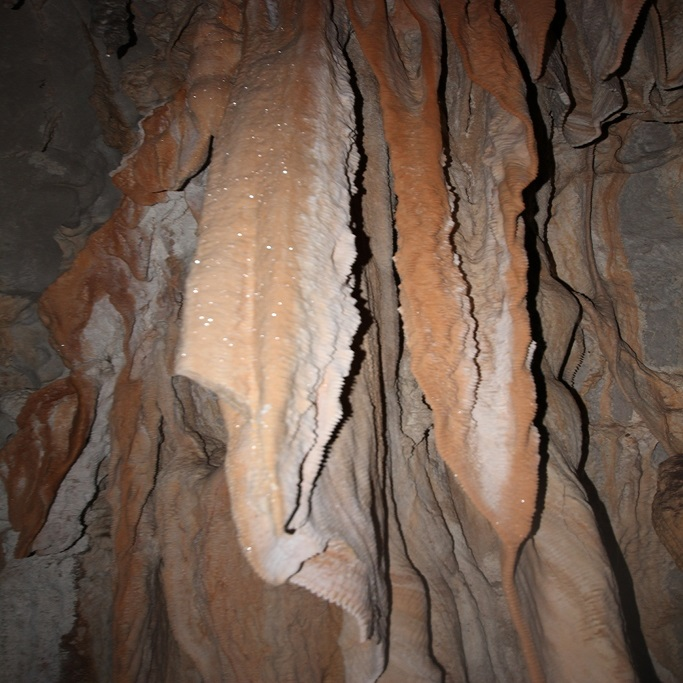

== Climate ==
Raxruhá has tropical climate (Köppen: Af).

Climate data for Raxruhá
Month	Jan	Feb	Mar	Apr	May	Jun	Jul	Aug	Sep	Oct	Nov	Dec	Year
Mean daily maximum °C (°F)	26.3 (79.3)	28.4 (83.1)	29.8 (85.6)	31.6 (88.9)	31.6 (88.9)	31.8 (89.2)	30.0 (86.0)	30.4 (86.7)	30.4 (86.7)	29.6 (85.3)	27.8 (82.0)	26.8 (80.2)	29.5 (85.2)
Daily mean °C (°F)	22.5 (72.5)	23.5 (74.3)	25.1 (77.2)	26.5 (79.7)	27.1 (80.8)	27.4 (81.3)	26.2 (79.2)	26.4 (79.5)	26.3 (79.3)	25.7 (78.3)	24.0 (75.2)	22.5 (72.5)	25.3 (77.5)
Mean daily minimum °C (°F)	18.8 (65.8)	18.6 (65.5)	20.5 (68.9)	21.4 (70.5)	22.6 (72.7)	23.0 (73.4)	22.5 (72.5)	22.4 (72.3)	22.2 (72.0)	21.8 (71.2)	20.3 (68.5)	18.3 (64.9)	21.0 (69.9)
Average precipitation mm (inches)	138 (5.4)	74 (2.9)	79 (3.1)	88 (3.5)	189 (7.4)	318 (12.5)	335 (13.2)	258 (10.2)	301 (11.9)	278 (10.9)	203 (8.0)	159 (6.3)	2,420 (95.3)
Source: Climate-Data.org

== Geographic location ==
Rahruhá is immersed in between Chisec and Fray Bartolomé de las Casas, which both Alta Verapaz Department municipalities.

== Notable people ==
- Jakelin Caal, 7-year-old child who died in the custody of the United States Border Patrol in 2018
