= Candelaria Caves =

National park in Alta Verapaz, Guatemala

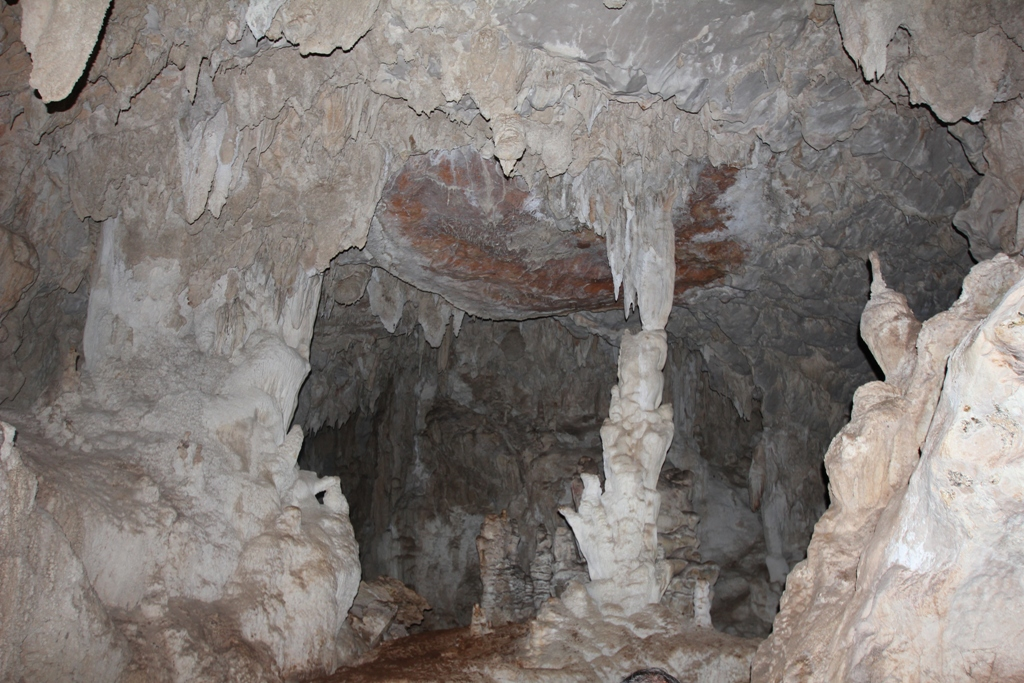
- Stalagmites, stalactites and columns inside the caves

- Location within Guatemala
- Location: Chisec, Raxruha (Guatemala)
- Coordinates: 15°51′58.468″N 90°2′36.193″W
- Length: c. 80,000 metres (260,000 ft)
- Discovery: Local Maya people
- Geology: Karst
- Entrances: multiple

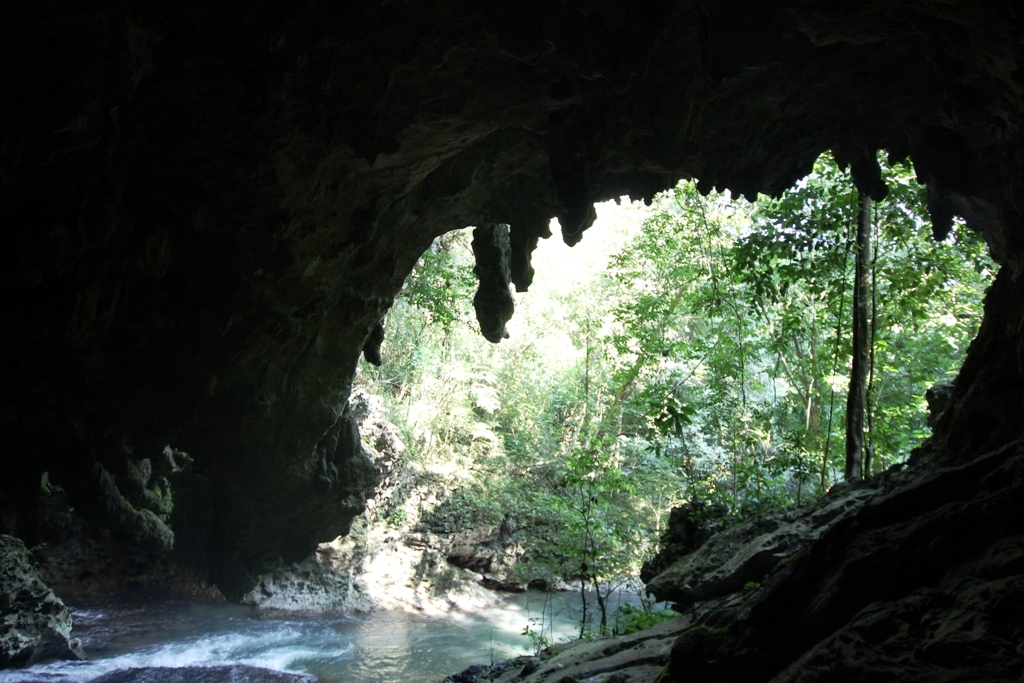
Candelaria Rive.

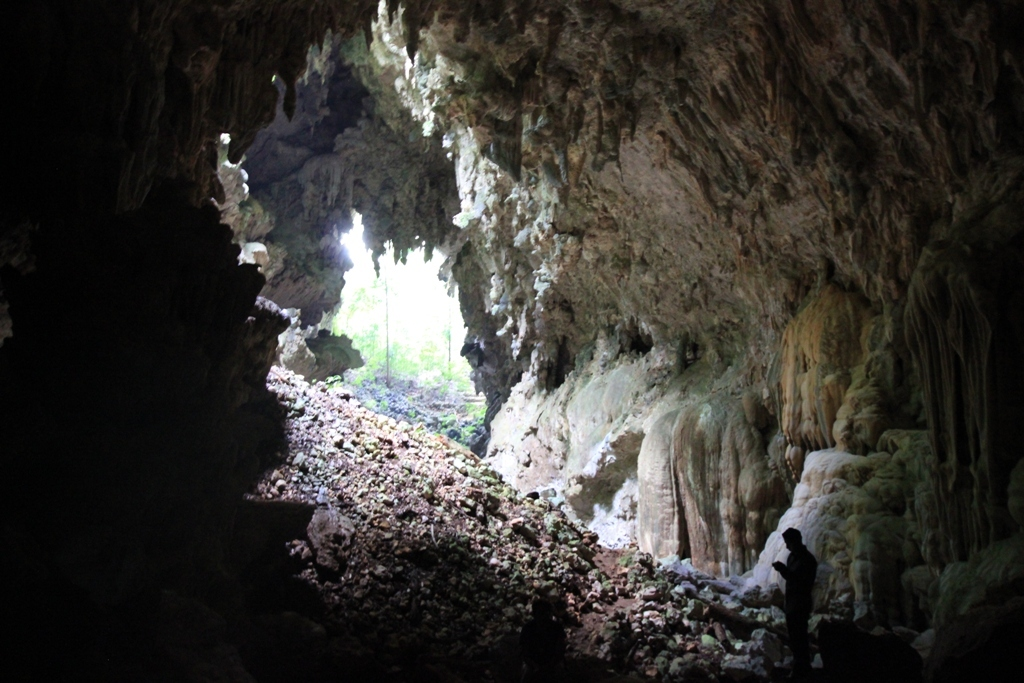
Pit cave

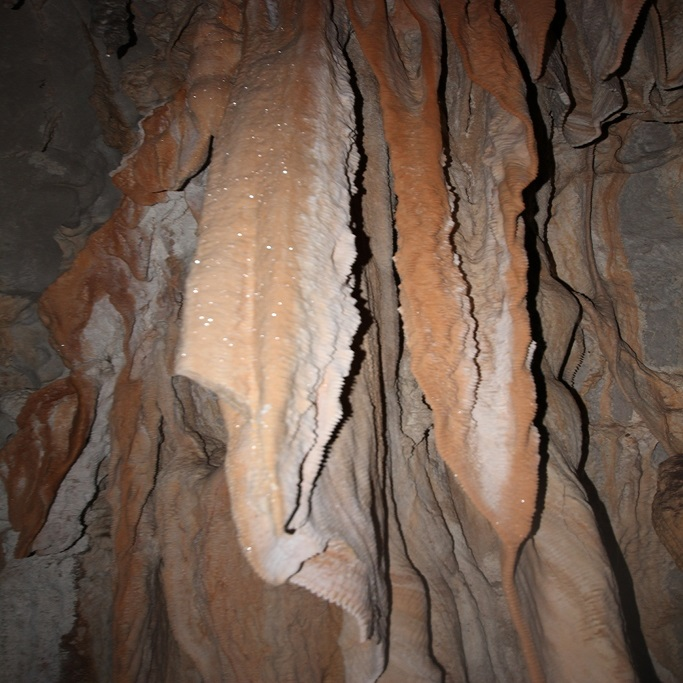
Flowstone drapes

The Candelaria Caves are a large natural cave system in the highland-lowland transition of Alta Verapaz in Guatemala between the municipalities of Chisec and Raxruha. The caves are famous for their peculiar karst phenomena and significance to Mayan history.

== Geology ==
Amongst the attractions of their huge karst caverns are speleothems like stalactites, stalagmites, stalagnates and flowstone drapes. Pit caves, caused by collapse of the ceiling, light the inside of the caves. The main gallery has a length of 22 km, of which 12.5 km follows the underground passage of the Candelaria River. The total length of the cave system, including coulisses, secondary and upper passages, is estimated to be 80 km.

== History ==
The Great Western Trade Route of the Classic Maya, which connected the Guatemalan highlands to the Petén lowlands, went through the Candelaria Caves area. Pottery artefacts and rupestral paintings evidence the use of the caves for ceremonies. The Popol Vuh of the K'iche' people considers the Candelaria Caves an entrance to the underworld. Some of the caves are still used for Mayan celebrations. Even though, the caves now are opened to the public.

== Administration ==
The government of Guatemala declared the Candelaria Caves national park in 1999. After long battles with the government the local Q'eqchi' people gained the management of tourism in the caves through their “Association Maya Q'eqchi Development and Tourism of Candelaria-Camposanto”. There are several entrances to the caves, managed by different Q'eqchi' communities like the association Bombilpek El Porvenir. They charge a small fee to visit the caves with a guide and use this fund to support the economic life of the village in the most equitable way possible.

The following table synthesizes the morphological, speleological, and socio-archaeological features across the Candelaria Caves system:

Speleological, Cultural, and Administrative Profile of the Candelaria Caves System
Sector / Passage	Dimensions & Hydrogeology	Associated Speleothems & Features	Archaeology, Ritual Use & Governance
Main River Gallery	12.5 km active subterranean stream; 22 km main trunk passage	Massive flowstone drapes, stalactites, stalagmites, and large vault collapse windows (pit caves)	Ancient trade corridor connecting the Guatemalan highlands to Petén; continuous Q'eqchi' ritual offerings.
Secondary & Upper Passages (Coulisses)	Estimated 80 km total subterranean network	Complex labyrinthine chambers, dry upper galleries, and rimstone pools	Ceramic deposits (Classic Maya), rupestral cave art, and sacred entrances associated with Xibalba in the Popol Vuh.
Community Management Zones	Transitional karst landscape between Chisec and Raxruha	Protected karst towers, sinkholes, and rainforest buffer zones	Managed by local Q'eqchi' associations (e.g., Candelaria-Camposanto) to fund equitable community development.

== Bibliography ==
- Del Cid, Mario; David R. García (2003). "The Candelarias cave, Alta Verapaz: Demythifying communitarian participation in patrimonial conservation" (PDF). famsi.org.
- Woodfill, Brent Kerry Skoy (2007). Shrines of the Pasión-Verapaz Region, Guatemala: Ritual and Exchange along Ancient Trade Route. Nashville.
