= San Cristóbal Verapaz =

- Municipality
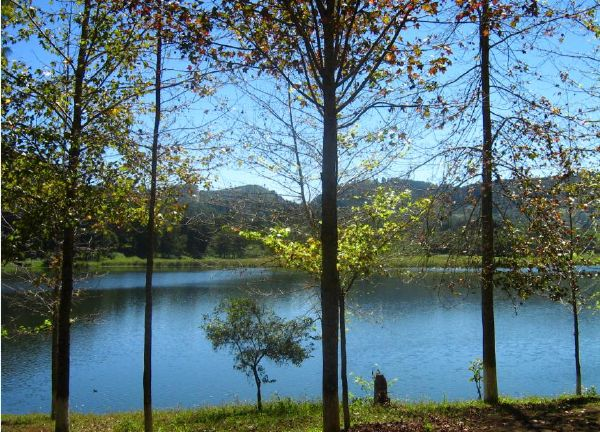
- Chicoj Lake in San Cristóbal Verapaz

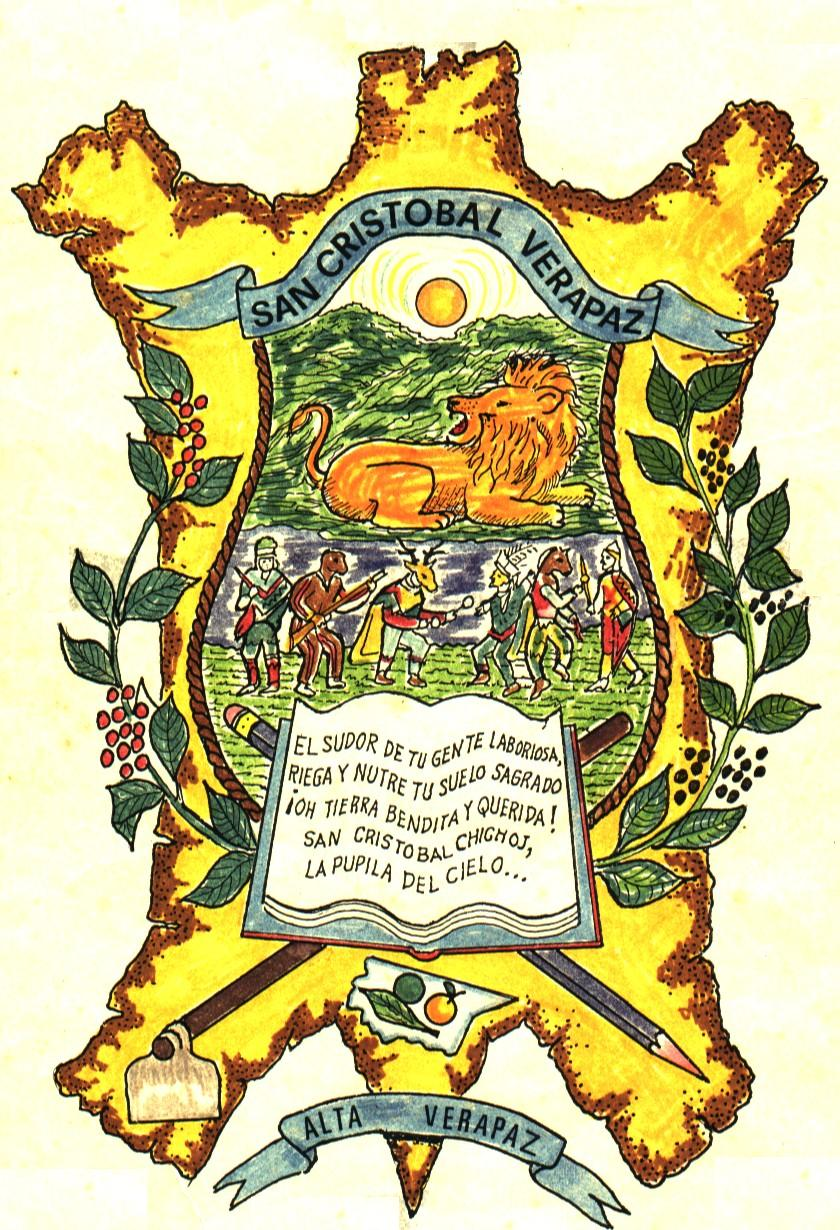
- Coat of arms

- Location in Guatemala
- Coordinates: 15°21′54″N 90°28′45″W
- Country: Guatemala
- Department: Alta Verapaz Department

Area
  - Total: 163 sq mi (423 km^{2})

Population (2018 census)
  - Total: 68,819
  - Density: 421/sq mi (163/km^{2})
- Climate: Cfb

San Cristóbal Verapaz (Spanish pronunciation: [saŋ kɾisˈtoβal βeɾaˈpas]) is a town, with a population of 20,961 (2018 census), and a municipality (population 68,819 at 2018 census) in the Guatemalan department of Alta Verapaz. It is located approximately 29 km from Cobán, the capital of Alta Verapaz and about 210 km from Guatemala City. San Cristóbal belongs to the Pokimchi' linguistic area. Its main income source is the «Cobán» shoe factory, which specializes in industrial rubber boots, which are sold both locally and internationally.

== History ==
=== Franja Transversal del Norte ===
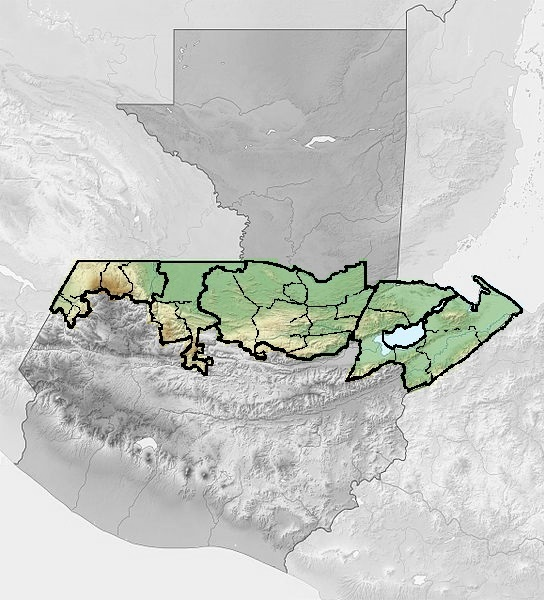
Location of San Cristóbal Verapapz bordering Franja Transversal del Norte

The Northern Transversal Strip was officially created during the government of General Carlos Arana Osorio in 1970, by Legislative Decree 60-70, for agricultural development. The decree literally said: "It is of public interest and national emergency, the establishment of Agrarian Development Zones in the area included within the municipalities: San Ana Huista, San Antonio Huista, Nentón, Jacaltenango, San Mateo Ixtatán, and Santa Cruz Barillas in Huehuetenango; Chajul and San Miguel Uspantán in Quiché; Cobán, Chisec, San Pedro Carchá, Lanquín, Senahú, Cahabón and Chahal, in Alta Verapaz and the entire department of Izabal."

San Cristóbal Verapaz was not part of the Strip, but it was bordering it and felt the devastating effects of the Guatemala Civil War which was fought mainly in the Strip during the 1980s.

== Religious celebrations and town fairs ==
Days	Neighborhood
13–15 January	Esquipulas
17–20 January	San Sebastian
20–25 July	San Cristóbal
24–26 April	San Felipe
20–25 July	Santa Ana

== Famous citizens ==
- Erick Barrondo: Olympic silver medalist in London 2012
- Rodolfo Narciso Chavarría: music composer

== Climate ==
San Cristóbal Verapaz has temperate climate (Köppen: Cfb).

Climate data for San Cristóbal Verapaz
Month	Jan	Feb	Mar	Apr	May	Jun	Jul	Aug	Sep	Oct	Nov	Dec	Year
Mean daily maximum °C (°F)	21.7 (71.1)	23.2 (73.8)	24.8 (76.6)	25.5 (77.9)	25.4 (77.7)	24.5 (76.1)	23.9 (75.0)	24.2 (75.6)	24.1 (75.4)	23.2 (73.8)	22.3 (72.1)	22.1 (71.8)	23.7 (74.7)
Daily mean °C (°F)	16.1 (61.0)	17.1 (62.8)	18.4 (65.1)	19.4 (66.9)	19.8 (67.6)	19.9 (67.8)	19.4 (66.9)	19.4 (66.9)	19.3 (66.7)	18.5 (65.3)	17.5 (63.5)	16.9 (62.4)	18.5 (65.2)
Mean daily minimum °C (°F)	10.6 (51.1)	11.1 (52.0)	12.1 (53.8)	13.4 (56.1)	14.3 (57.7)	15.3 (59.5)	14.9 (58.8)	14.6 (58.3)	14.6 (58.3)	13.9 (57.0)	12.7 (54.9)	11.7 (53.1)	13.3 (55.9)
Average precipitation mm (inches)	70 (2.8)	45 (1.8)	62 (2.4)	59 (2.3)	139 (5.5)	300 (11.8)	270 (10.6)	238 (9.4)	290 (11.4)	244 (9.6)	150 (5.9)	79 (3.1)	1,946 (76.6)
Source: Climate-Data.org

== Geographic location ==
=== Municipal distribution ===
The rural area of the municipality has eighty nine communities, while the villa has five neighborhoods: Santa Ana, San Felipe, San Cristóbal, San Sebastián y Esquipulas. The municipality is divided into the following microregions:

- One villa
- Six large settlements
- Fifty seven small settlements
- Sixteen common land areas
- Five neighborhoods
- Four cantones
- Three residential areas

There are eighteen populated locations that are considered the most important due to the number of inhabitants and utility availability and access:

#	Standout locations by microregion	Converging locations
1.	Santa Ana neighborhood	Colonia El Petencito, Finca Nisnic, Cantón Oram, Colonia Paná, Santa Ana Pampur, Tucanjan, Pantup
2.	San Sebastián neighborhood	Agua Bendita, Esquipulas neighborhood, San Cristóbal neighborhood, San Felipe neighborhood, Pankox, Venecia
3.	Vista Hermosa	Chisiram, Villa Nueva
4.	El Salmar	Agua Blanca, San Joaquín, San José Chitusul, Santa Ana Pan Kix, Chisiram, Villa Nueva, Vista Hermosa, Saqlik, Santa María
5.	Chiyuc	Aquil Grande, Chilley, El Alfiler, Finca El Rosario, Caserío la Independencia, Caserío Panek, Pantocan
6.	La Reforma	Pamac, Rexkix, Wachtuhq, Las Arrugas, La Esperanza
7.	La Pacaya	Chirehtzulchituj, Chirexkiche, Chitj Panhux, Najtilabaj
8.	Paniste	Pancaseu
9.	San Lucas Chiacal	
10.	San Inés Chicar	Las Victorias, Pancaseu, Panisté, Secoyon, Tinta
11.	Baleu	Zacatón
12.	Santa Elena	Saqixim, Quejá, Santa Rosa, Chepenal, Las Minas
13.	Pampacche	Mexabaj, Panzal, San Sebastián El Refujio, Wachkob', Pambón Grande
14.	El Rancho	Ceero Verde, Santa María Agua Blanca, Chiworrom, Chipozo, Chisiguan, Wachkuz, Pamboncito, Panajmay, Nuevo Panhux, Santa Cruz del Quetzal
15.	Pantzimaj	Chicuz, Panhux, Cedral
16.	La Providencia	Quixalito, Pampur La Providencia
17.	Cumbre Pamuc	
18.	Navidad	

Source: "Mapas de Guatemala en Línea". SINIT, SEGEPLAN (in Spanish). Guatemala. 2008. Archived from the original on March 5, 2008.

== See also ==
- Lake Chichoj

== Notes and references ==
=== Bibliography ===
- Solano, Luis (2012). Contextualización histórica de la Franja Transversal del Norte (FTN) (PDF) (in Spanish). Centro de Estudios y Documentación de la Frontera Occidental de Guatemala, CEDFOG. Archived from the original (PDF) on 13 November 2014.
