= Grutas de Lanquín =

National park in Alta Verapaz, Guatemala

Grutas de Lanquín National Park
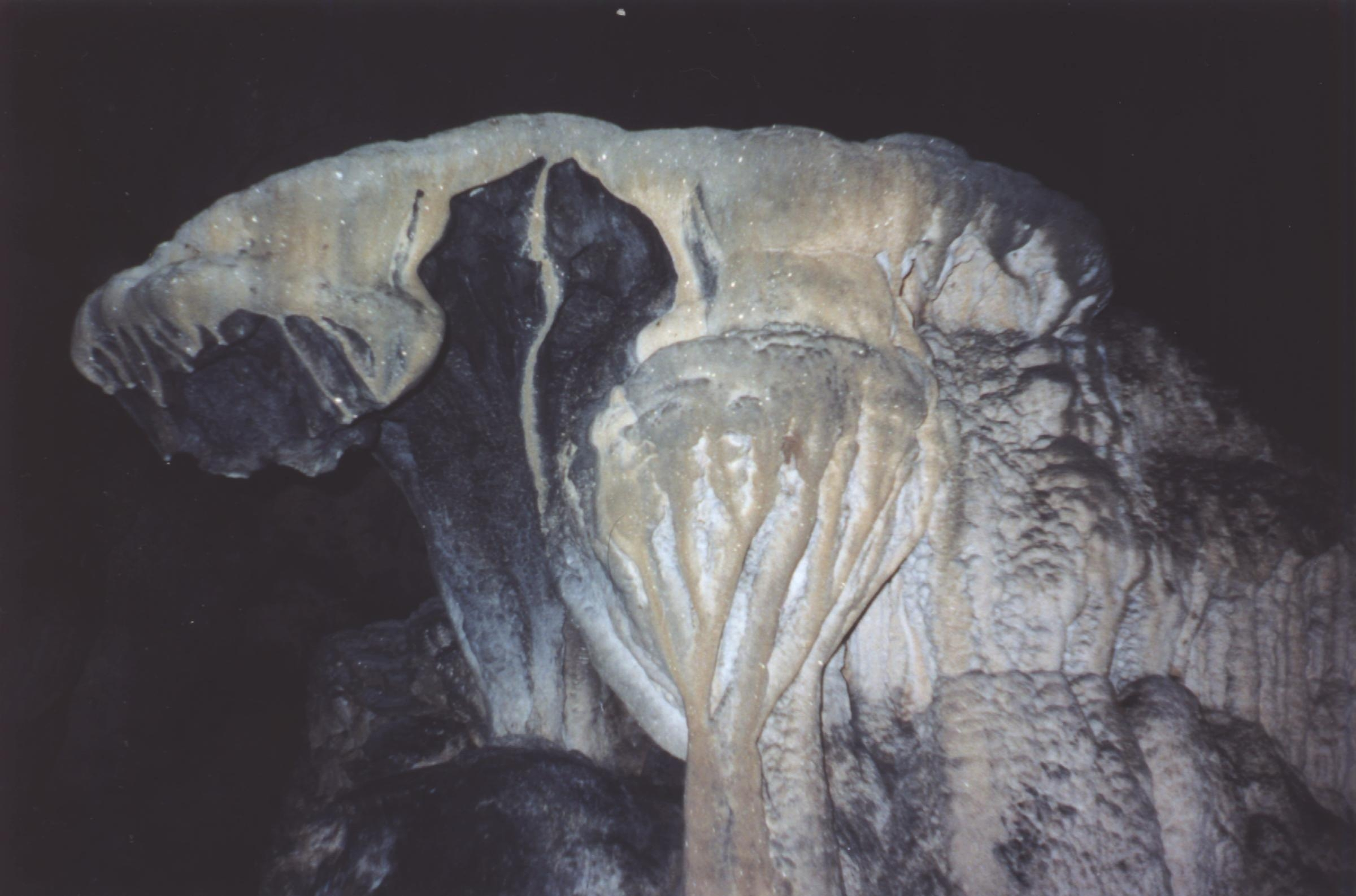
- Rock formation inside the caves.
- Interactive map of Grutas de Lanquín; National Park
- Location: Alta Verapaz, Guatemala
- Coordinates: 15°34′56″N 89°59′16″W
- Area: 0.11 km^{2} (0.042 sq mi)
- Established: Acuerdo Gubernativo 26-05-55
- Visitors: allowed
- Operator: CONAP; Municipality of Lanquín
- Website: www.semucchampey.com

Grutas de Lanquín is a large limestone cave system located 1 kilometre (0.62 mi) west of Lanquín in Alta Verapaz, Guatemala.

The Lanquín cave system was declared a national park in 1955.
