= Semuc Champey =

Natural monument in Alta Verapaz, Guatemala

Semuc Champey Natural Monument
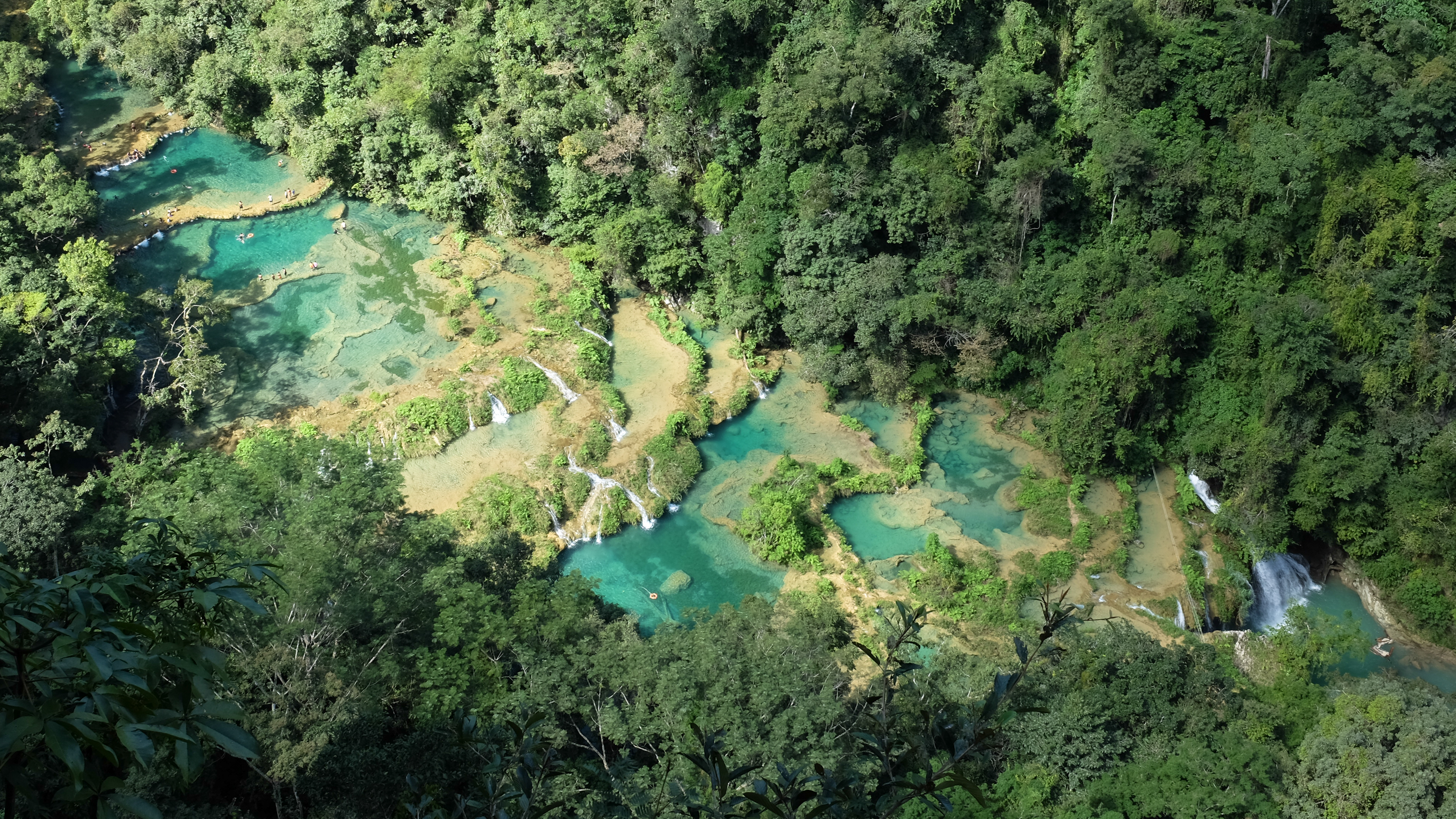
- Pools in the Cahabòn River

- Location within Guatemala
- Location: Lanquín, Alta Verapaz, Guatemala
- Coordinates: 15°32′0″N 89°57′41″W
- Area: 17.14 km^{2} (6.62 sq mi)
- Elevation: 380 m (1,250 ft)
- Established: 2005
- Operator: CONAP, Municipality of Languín

Semuc Champey is a natural enclave in the department of Alta Verapaz, Guatemala. It consists of a natural 300-metre (980 ft) karst landbridge formed by travertine limestone deposits, beneath which the main flow of the Cahabón River plunges into a subterranean cave system via a natural sinkhole (known locally as El Sumidero). Located near the Qʼeqchiʼ Maya town of Lanquín, the top of this limestone formation features a stepped series of natural, turquoise-green pools fed by mountain spring runoff, creating a unique freshwater ecosystem within the subtropical rainforest of the Petén-Verapaz region.

The name Semuc Champey is from the Qʼeqchiʼ language, meaning where the river hides under the earth. The natural monument was established in 2005 by Decreto No. 025.

The best and most popular way to see Semuc Champey is from the "El Mirador" viewpoint. Though it is a roughly 45-minute, hot, uphill jungle hike from the parking area, the views into the valley are unparalleled.

Although it can be difficult to get to, Semuc is becoming more and more popular with travelers.

== Hydrogeology and travertine karst dynamics ==
The structural formation of Semuc Champey is a rare fluvial-karst phenomenon created by continuous calcium carbonate precipitation along the lower Cahabón River valley. The 300-meter natural bridge consists of active travertine speleothems and stepped dams fed by mineral-rich epikarst spring waters, which flow independently over the subterranean cavern system housing the main river surge.

- El Sumidero Swallow Hole: The primary hydrological intake where the volume of the main Cahabón River plunges abruptly beneath the limestone shelf, entering a 300-meter subterranean cavernous conduit before resurging downstream at El Resurgidero.
- Biogenic Travertine Cascades: A sequence of tiered natural pools formed by the deposition of calcite onto organic substrate (cyanobacteria, mosses, and macro-invertebrates). The characteristic turquoise coloration results from high concentrations of dissolved bicarbonate ions reflecting solar radiation in shallow water settings.
- Epikarst Thermal Springs: Secondary freshwater inputs originating from the surrounding karst ridges of the Sierra de Chama, which supply cool, highly oxygenated water directly into the upper terraced pools, supporting endemic aquatic fauna and freshwater algae.

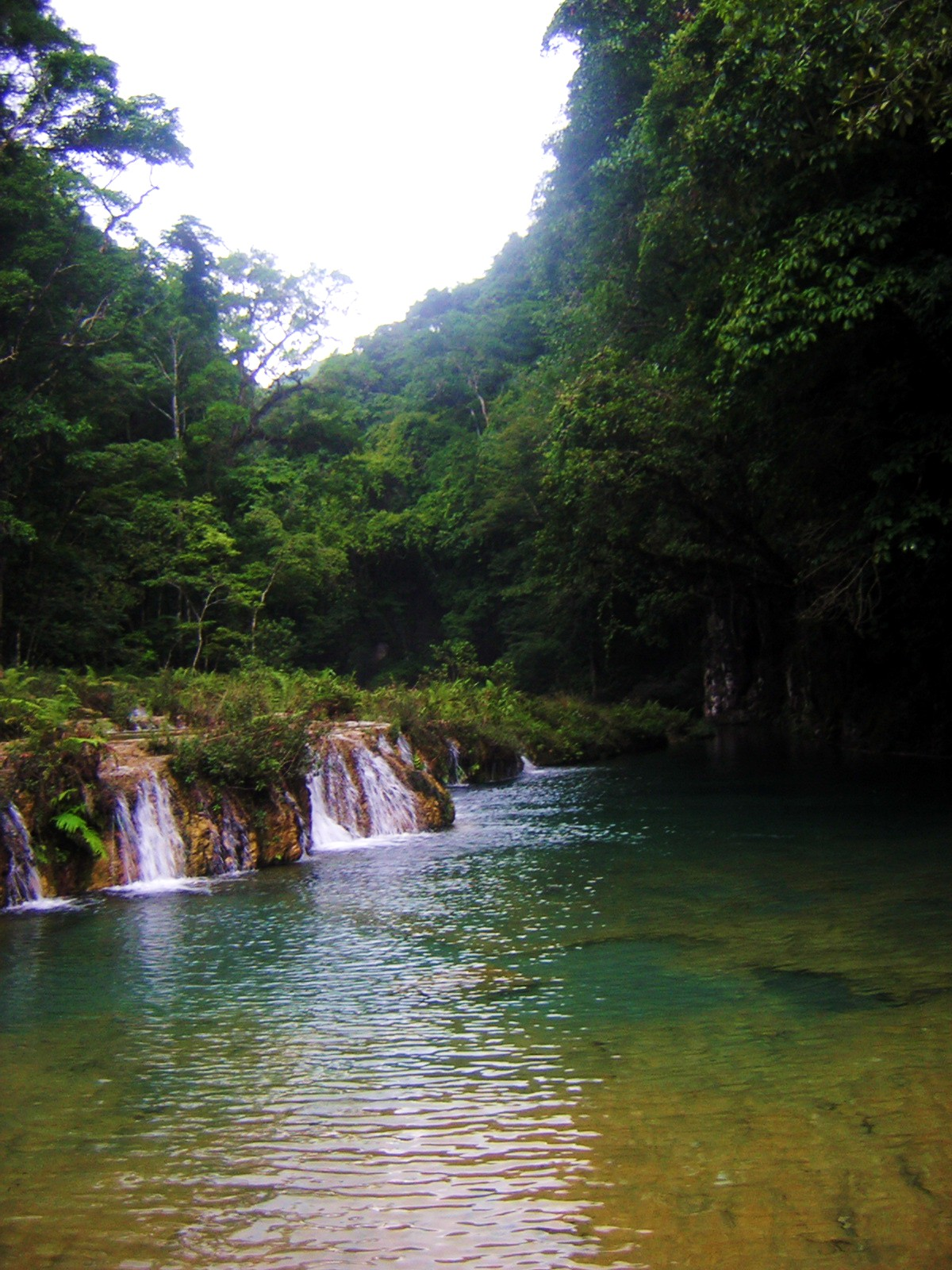
Semuc Champei lakes view
