= Santa Cruz Verapaz =

- Municipality
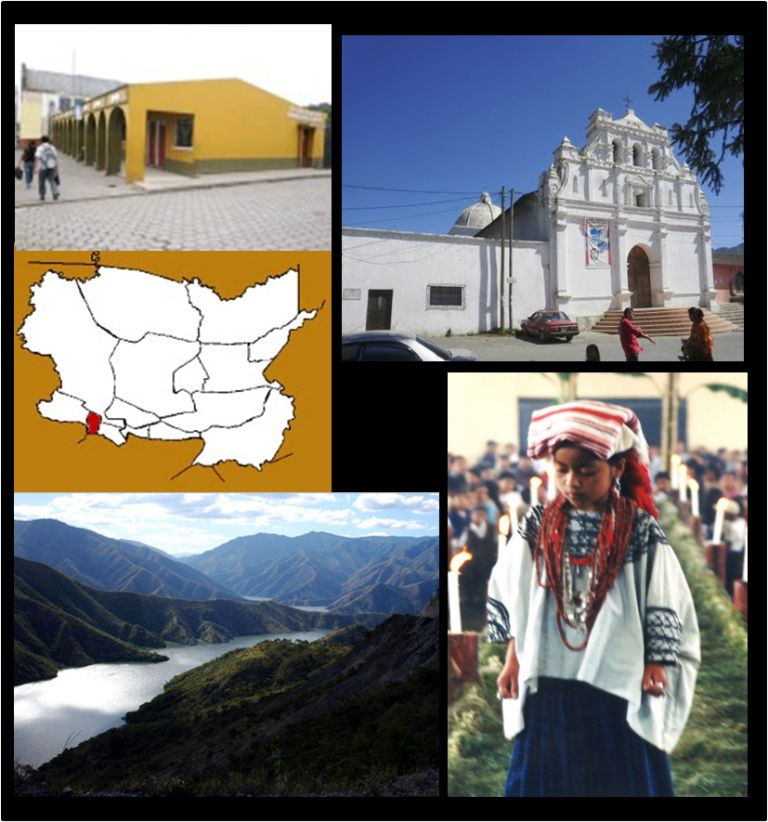

- Location in Guatemala
- Coordinates: 15°22′25″N 90°25′50″W
- Country: Guatemala
- Region: Corredor Seco
- Department: Alta Verapaz
- Municipality: Santa Cruz Verapaz

Government
  - Type: Municipal
  - Mayor: Manuel Quejem (CREO)

Area
  - Municipality: 99.9 km^{2} (38.6 sq mi)
- Elevation: 1,406 m (4,613 ft)

Population (Census 2018)
  - Municipality: 32,042
  - Density: 321/km^{2} (831/sq mi)
  - Urban: 8,630
  - Ethnicities: Q'eqchi Ladino
  - Religions: Roman Catholicism Evangelicalism Maya
- Climate: Cfb
- Website: http://www.inforpressca.com/santacruzav/

Santa Cruz Verapaz (Spanish pronunciation: [ˈsanta ˈkɾus βeɾaˈpas]) is a town and municipality in the Guatemalan department of Alta Verapaz. The municipality lies at an altitude of 1,406 metres (4,613 ft) above sea level. It has a population of 32,042 (2018 census) and covers an area of 99.9 km². The annual festival is May 1-May 5.

== History ==
Friars Juan de Torres, Pedro de Angulo and Luis de Cancer, O.P. founded the settlement of "Santa Cruz de Santa Elena", in the region of the Munchú territory, and therefore, the town was originally known as "Santa Cruz Munchú". The town was established on 3 May 1543, according to the minutes from 1 May 1546 taken in Ciudad Real de San Juan Chamelco by Juan Matalbatz, governor of the region at the time.

The Catholic church was built in the 16th century and therefore it has a high historical value; like the one in Rabinal in Baja Verapaz Department, it was one of the first Catholic temples built in the region during the Capitulaciones de Tezulutlán. The prestiberium design was magnificent, but it has been damaged over the centuries by the constant seismic events that affect the Guatemalan territory.

By an executive order of the Secretary of Education, the church was named as National Historic place on 12 July 1970.

== Administrative division ==
Santa Cruz Verapaz has an urban and a rural area.

Administrative division
Type	List
Urban neighborhoods	Santa Elena; Santa Cecilia; Santo Tomás; Santa Cruz
Urban residential areas	Res. Milano; El Bosque; Los Ángeles; Oro Verde; Los Olivos
Villages	Acamal; Chicoyoj; Chijou; Chiquigüital; Chitul; Chixajau; Najquitob
Parajes	Chicac Acal; Chi´k oxb; Laguneta; Los Arcos; Paris Tumiin
Small villages	Cak´abaj; Carchelá; Chalcoxoj; Chilocom; Chisaczí; El Arco; El Cangrejo; El Palmar; El Salto; El Zapote; Holanda; La isla; Las Camelias; Los Arcos; Moxenjá; Pambach; Pana; Pancalax; Panquiyou; Peña del Gallo Parrochoch; Rio Frio; Rosario; Sacmés; San Antonio Panec; Santa Elena; Saquijá; Saquimax; Valparaíso; Villa linda; Wach Q´amcheé; Xutjá
Farms and haciendas	Capiljá; Cerro Verde; Clarita; Don Pedro; El Cangrejo; El Porvenir; El Rosario; Holanda; La Aurora; Las Camelias; Las Conchas; Chisacsí; Maria Auxiliadora; Mocjá; Panbach; Rio Frio; Santa Elena; Santa Isabel; San Rafael; San Vicente; Valparaíso; Villa linda

== Territory configuration ==
Territory configuration
Tipo	Listado
Mountains	Tomtem; Saltul; Santa Apolonia; Xucaneb; Sierra Pancajché; Sierra de Chamá; Gruta Santa Elena y Chitul; Cerro Chisos; Cerro Chitul; Cerro San Rafael
Rivers	Frío; Carchelá; Chirripitán; Chixoy; Quililá; Saquijá; Cahabón; Sacbin; Santa María; La Cueva; Chojomá; El Palmar; Guachcojloy; Pambach; Panchlax

== Climate ==
Santa Cruz Verapaz has temperate climate (Köppen: Cfb).

Climate data for Santa Cruz Verapaz
Month	Jan	Feb	Mar	Apr	May	Jun	Jul	Aug	Sep	Oct	Nov	Dec	Year
Mean daily maximum °C (°F)	21.1 (70.0)	22.6 (72.7)	24.2 (75.6)	25.0 (77.0)	24.8 (76.6)	23.9 (75.0)	23.3 (73.9)	23.7 (74.7)	23.6 (74.5)	22.8 (73.0)	21.6 (70.9)	21.5 (70.7)	23.2 (73.7)
Daily mean °C (°F)	15.8 (60.4)	16.7 (62.1)	18.0 (64.4)	19.1 (66.4)	19.4 (66.9)	19.4 (66.9)	19.0 (66.2)	19.0 (66.2)	19.0 (66.2)	18.2 (64.8)	17.0 (62.6)	16.5 (61.7)	18.1 (64.6)
Mean daily minimum °C (°F)	10.5 (50.9)	10.9 (51.6)	11.9 (53.4)	13.2 (55.8)	14.1 (57.4)	15.0 (59.0)	14.7 (58.5)	14.4 (57.9)	14.5 (58.1)	13.7 (56.7)	12.5 (54.5)	11.6 (52.9)	13.1 (55.6)
Average precipitation mm (inches)	76 (3.0)	46 (1.8)	66 (2.6)	59 (2.3)	140 (5.5)	303 (11.9)	278 (10.9)	254 (10.0)	302 (11.9)	254 (10.0)	155 (6.1)	83 (3.3)	2,016 (79.3)
Source: Climate-Data.org

== See also ==
- Alta Verapaz Department
