= Tactic, Guatemala =

Tactic
- Municipality
- Tactic
- Motto: "Trabajamos por el desarrollo del pueblo" (We work for people development)
- Location within Guatemala
- Coordinates: 15°19′0″N 90°21′4″W
- Country: Guatemala
- Department: Alta Verapaz
- Order of Preachers Doctrine: 1545
- Incorporated: 1877

Government
  - Type: Mayor–Council
  - Body: Tactic municipal council
  - Mayor of Tactic: Edín Guerrero

Area
  - Total: 102 km^{2} (39 sq mi)
- Elevation: 1,465 m (4,806 ft)

Population (2018 census)
  - Total: 38,052
  - Density: 373/km^{2} (966/sq mi)
- Demonym: Tactiqueño/Tactiqueña
- Time zone: UTC-6 (Central America)
- Climate: Cfb
- Website: Tactic municipality

Tactic (Spanish pronunciation: [taɣˈtik]) is a town and a municipality in the Guatemalan department of Alta Verapaz. It is situated at 1,465 m above sea level. The municipality has a population of 38,052 and covers an area of 102 km². At the 2018 census, the population of the Tactic town was 15,213. The languages spoken in Tactic are predominantly Spanish, Poqomchiʼ, and Q'eqchi'.

== History ==
=== Pre-Hispanic era ===
Before Columbus, there were only ceremonial centers in the area; these centers were located in Chiáchan, Guaxpac, Janté, Chiji, Cuyquel, Patal, Pansalché and Chiacal. And there also was a ceremonial hill in Chi-ixim, where the caciques, priest and other leaders gathered to celebrate every new moon; Chicán was the second ceremonial center in importance.

=== Order of Preachers in the Vera Paz ===
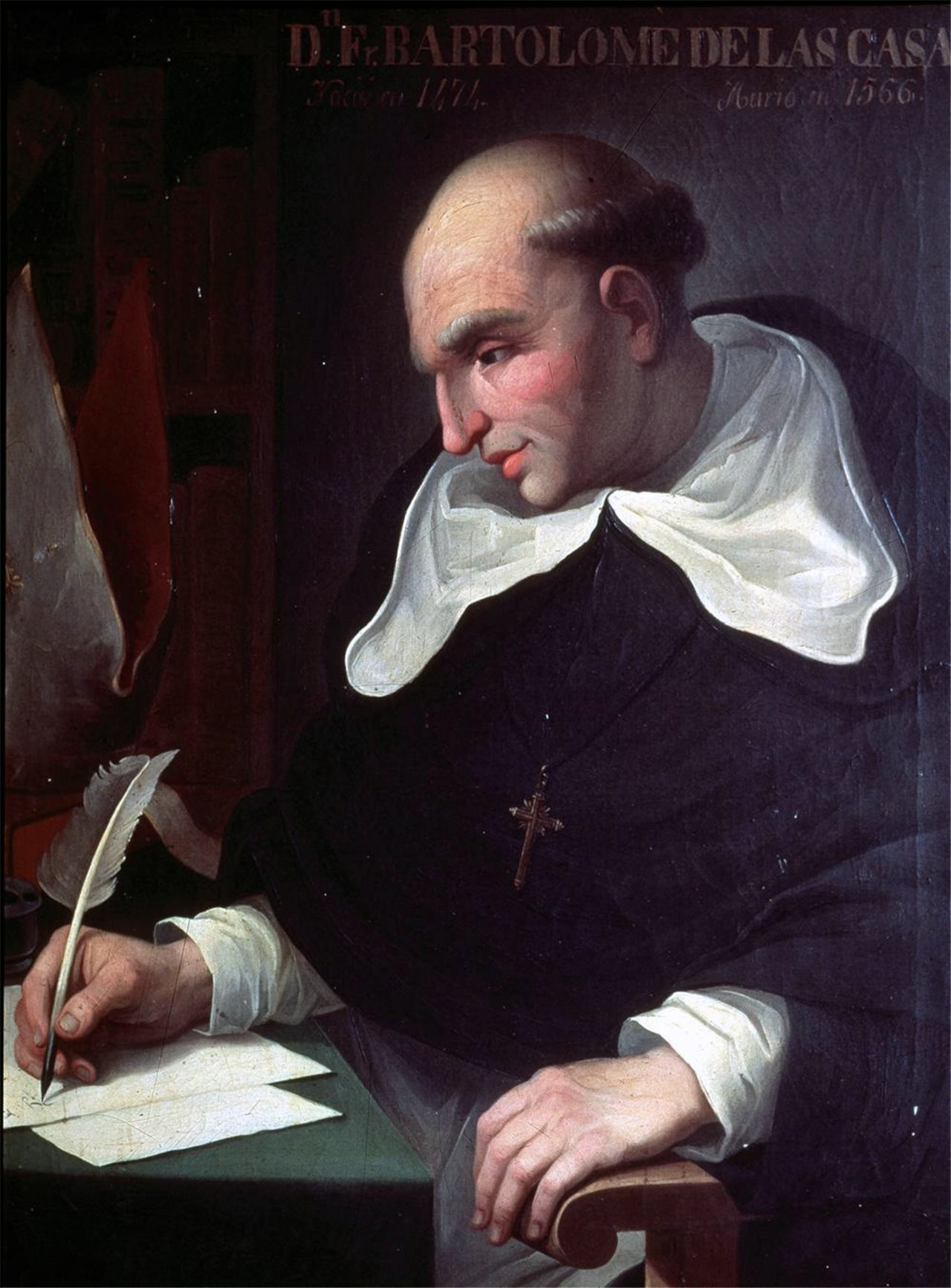
Fray Bartolomé de las Casas, O.P. who along friars Rodrigo de Landa, Pedro Angulo and Luis de Cáncer, O.P, started Vera paz Christian indoctrination in 1542.

Between 1530 and 1531, captain Alonso de Ávila on his way to Ciudad Real accidentally discovered the lagoon and hill of Lacam-Tún. People of that place had historically traded with all the people that the Spaniards had conquered and knowing what was coming, sought refuge in the jungle. The Spaniards tried in vain to conquer the lacandones: from Nueva España Juan Enríquez de Guzman tried; from the Yucatán Peninsula tried Francisco de Montejo; Pedro de Alvarado attempted it from Guatemala along with captain Francisco Gil Zapata and, finally, Pedro Solórzano from Chiapas. That is when the Order of Preachers tried to convert the Tezulutlán "War Zone" into a peaceful region.

In the meantime, after a series of setbacks in La Española, the island Audiencia allowed Bartolomé de las Casas to accept Friar Tomás de Berlanga invitation to go to Nueva Granada in 1534, where he had just been appointed as Bishop. Both sailed toward Panama, to then continue to the city of Lima, but during the trip a storm tossed their ship to Nicaragua, where Las Casas chose to remain in the Granada convent. in 1535, he proposed to the King and the Indias Council to start a peaceful colonization of the unexplored rural zones in the Guatemala region; however, in spite of Bernal Díaz de Luco and Mercado de Peñaloza intentions to help him, his suggestion was rejected. In 1536 Nicaragua governor, Rodrigo de Contreras, organized a military expedition, but Las Casas was able to postpone it by a couple of years after he notified queen Isabel de Portugal, wife of Carlos V. Given the authorities hostilities, Las Casas left Nicaragua y went to Guatemala.

On November 1536, Las Casas settled in Santiago de Guatemala, then the capital of Guatemala; a few months later, his friend bishop Juan Garcés, invited him to move to Tlascala, but after a few weeks he came back to Guatemala. On May 2, 1537 governor Alfonso de Maldonado granted him the Tezulutlán Capitulations - a written commitment ratified on July 6, 1539 by Antonio de Mendoza, México Viceroy- in which everybody agreed that Tezulutlán natives, once conquered, would not be given as encomienda but would be King's subjects. Las Casas, along with friars Rodrigo de Landa, Pedro Angulo and Luis de Cancer, looked for four Christian nataives and taught them Christian hymns where the Gospel basic principles were explained. Luis de Cancer visited the cacique of Sacapulas and was able to perform the first baptisms among his people. Later, Las Casas lead a retinue to bring girts to the cacique, who was so impressed, that decided to convert and become his people preacher. The cacique was baptized with the name of «Don Juan» and the natives granted permission to build a small church; however, Cobán, another cacique, burned the church. «Don Juan», along sixty men, Las Casas and Pedro Angulo, went to talk to Cobán's people and convinced them of their good intentions; «Don Juan» even took the initiative to marry one of his daughters with cacique Cobán by the Catholic Church.

In 1539 pope Paul III had authorized the diocese of Ciudad Real; Ciudad Real diocesis included Chiapas, Soconusco, la Vera Paz (including the Lacandon jungle), Tabasco and the still non-conquered Yucatán Peninsula. That year, Alonso de Maldonado -under pressure by Spanish settlers- began a military campaign in Tezulutlán y gave all the natives in encomiendas. This flagrant violation to the Capitulations enraged Las Casas who traveled to Spain to denounce it before the king Charles V. On January 9, 1540 a royal document was issued in which the Tezulutlán Capitulations ere ratified and gave the region to the protection of the Order of Preachers. On October 17 of that year, Cardinal García de Loaysa -then president of the Indias Council- ordered the México Audiencia to comply with these laws. The Capitulations were officially published on January 21, 1541 in the church of Sevilla.

Las Casas was appointed bishop of Chiapas in 1544, but he tried to apply the new lays in his diocese, these were flatly rejected by the encomenderos. In 1545, Guatemala bishop Francisco Marroquín visited Tezulutlán y met with the preachers. Back in the city of Gracias a Dios, where the Audiencia de los Confines had its main office- met with Las Casas and with Nicaragua bishop Antonio de Valdivieso. There was a lot of tension between Marroquín and Las Casas in this meeting: Las Casas accused Marroquín of having slave Indians and to have a repartimiento along with preaching "toxic doctrine"; Marroquín on the other hand, accused Las Casas of going beyond his jurisdiction. The conflict moved on to Ciudad de México and finally everybody agreed to favor the freedom of the natives; however, this could not be accomplished for the Lacandon Jungle would not be conquered for another two century, becoming the rebel maya people favorite hideout.

Las Casas and Angulo founded Rabinal, and the city of Cobán was the center of the new Catholic doctrine. A few years later, the natives started settling following the Spanish model and several towns were settled, like Tactic. The name "War zone" was change for "Vera Paz" (true peace), name that became official in 1547.

On July 2, 1545 Tactic celebrated its first baptisms.

=== Independence and German settlers ===
On December 10, 1877 president Justo Rufino Barrios executive order moved Tactic from the Baja Verapaz department to Alta Verapaz; its first mayor was Miguel Peláez in 1900.

Ca. 1890, British archeologist Alfred Percival Maudslay came to Guatemala, and traveled the Verapaz; he described Tactic as follows: «Towards evening we reached the ugly little wind-swept hamlet of Tactic, the usual resting-place for travelers between Cobán and the port of Panzós. (Note: In the 1890s, Panzós was the most important fluvial port in the region as it was used to ship coffee towards the Caribbean Sea through the Polochic river, and Lake of Izabal.) Travelers must often fare badly, for one small inn, containing a single bedroom, was all the accommodation the village appeared to afford; and but for Mr. Thomae's forethought in telegraphing to secure this room for us, we might have had to share the verandah for the night with native travellers, arrieros, and dogs, and probably have gone supperless to bed. At Tactic we left the cart-road leading to Panzos, which, after surmounting the divide, strikes the source of the Rio Polochic, and follows its banks to the eastward."

Around the time that Maudslay was visiting Verapaz, a German colony had settled in the area thanks to generous concessions granted by liberal presidents Manuel Lisandro Barillas Bercián, José María Reyna Barrios and Manuel Estrada Cabrera. The Germans had a very united and solid community and had several activities in the German Club (Deutsche Verein), in Cobán, which they had founded in 1888. Their main commercial activity was coffee plantations. German influence remained in Verapaz even after the German settlers were expelled and their possessions confiscated by the government after Germany defeat in both World War I and World War II.

== Tourism ==
Import tourist sites are:

- cold waters of Chamche
- Chi-ixim temple, where is located the black Christ
- Live well

== Climate ==
Tactic has temperate climate (Köppen: Cfb).

Climate data for Tactic
Month	Jan	Feb	Mar	Apr	May	Jun	Jul	Aug	Sep	Oct	Nov	Dec	Year
Mean daily maximum °C (°F)	20.1 (68.2)	21.8 (71.2)	23.3 (73.9)	23.9 (75.0)	24.1 (75.4)	23.2 (73.8)	22.4 (72.3)	23.0 (73.4)	23.0 (73.4)	22.1 (71.8)	21.3 (70.3)	20.9 (69.6)	22.4 (72.4)
Daily mean °C (°F)	15.2 (59.4)	16.3 (61.3)	17.6 (63.7)	18.4 (65.1)	19.0 (66.2)	19.0 (66.2)	18.4 (65.1)	18.7 (65.7)	18.7 (65.7)	17.9 (64.2)	16.9 (62.4)	16.1 (61.0)	17.7 (63.8)
Mean daily minimum °C (°F)	10.4 (50.7)	10.8 (51.4)	11.9 (53.4)	13.0 (55.4)	14.0 (57.2)	14.8 (58.6)	14.5 (58.1)	14.4 (57.9)	14.4 (57.9)	13.7 (56.7)	12.5 (54.5)	11.4 (52.5)	13.0 (55.4)
Average precipitation mm (inches)	78 (3.1)	44 (1.7)	68 (2.7)	58 (2.3)	140 (5.5)	287 (11.3)	258 (10.2)	233 (9.2)	283 (11.1)	233 (9.2)	142 (5.6)	79 (3.1)	1,903 (75)
Source: Climate-Data.org

== See also ==
- Alta Verapaz Department
- Bartolomé de Las Casas
- Franja Transversal del Norte
