= San Juan Chamelco =

- Municipality

- Location in Guatemala
- Coordinates: 15°25′32.430″N 90°19′34.626″W
- Country: Guatemala
- Department: Alta Verapaz
- Municipality: San Juan Chamelco

Government
  - Type: Municipal

Area
  - Municipality: 228 km^{2} (88 sq mi)

Population (2023)
  - Municipality: 64,144
  - Density: 281/km^{2} (729/sq mi)
  - Urban: 13,264
  - Rural: 44,192
  - Ethnicities: Q'eqchi' Ladino
  - Religions: Roman Catholicism Evangelicalism Maya
- Climate: Cfb

San Juan Chamelco is a town and a municipality in the Guatemalan department of Alta Verapaz. The municipality is situated at 1,350 metres above sea level and covers an area of 228 km^{2}. The annual festival is on June 24. At the 2018 census, the population of the municipality was 57,456 and that of the town of San Juan Chamelco was 13,264.

Alta Verapaz is known for its diverse geography, including mountains, forests, and rivers. San Juan Chamelco, like many other municipalities in the region, is likely characterized by a mix of indigenous and mestizo populations.

== Climate ==
San Juan Chamelco has temperate climate (Köppen: Cfb).

Climate data for San Juan Chamelco
Month	Jan	Feb	Mar	Apr	May	Jun	Jul	Aug	Sep	Oct	Nov	Dec	Year
Mean daily maximum °C (°F)	20.8 (69.4)	22.4 (72.3)	23.8 (74.8)	24.4 (75.9)	24.6 (76.3)	23.9 (75.0)	23.1 (73.6)	23.6 (74.5)	23.6 (74.5)	22.7 (72.9)	21.7 (71.1)	21.2 (70.2)	23.0 (73.4)
Daily mean °C (°F)	15.5 (59.9)	16.6 (61.9)	17.8 (64.0)	18.8 (65.8)	19.6 (67.3)	19.7 (67.5)	19.1 (66.4)	19.2 (66.6)	19.2 (66.6)	18.4 (65.1)	17.2 (63.0)	16.4 (61.5)	18.1 (64.6)
Mean daily minimum °C (°F)	10.3 (50.5)	10.9 (51.6)	11.9 (53.4)	13.3 (55.9)	14.6 (58.3)	15.5 (59.9)	15.2 (59.4)	14.9 (58.8)	14.9 (58.8)	14.1 (57.4)	12.8 (55.0)	11.6 (52.9)	13.3 (56.0)
Average precipitation mm (inches)	105 (4.1)	72 (2.8)	91 (3.6)	83 (3.3)	158 (6.2)	286 (11.3)	254 (10.0)	240 (9.4)	300 (11.8)	283 (11.1)	193 (7.6)	116 (4.6)	2,181 (85.8)
Source: Climate-Data.org

== Geographic location ==
San Juan Chamelco is surrounded by Alta Verapaz Department municipalities.

== Demographics ==
Gender (2023)
Male	31,703
Female	32,441

Age Groups (2023)
0-14 years	21,756
15-64 years	39,315
65+ years	3,073

Age Distribution (2023)
70+ years	2,063
60-69 years	2,227
50-59 years	3,471
40-49 years	6,352
30-39 years	9,078
20-29 years	12,816
10-19 years	13,643
0-9 years	14,494

Urbanization (2018)
Rural	44,192
Urban	13,264

Place of Birth (2018)
Same municipality	51,260
Other municipality in Guatemala	5,558
Other country	49

Ethnic Group (2018)
Maya	55,755
Garifuna	56
Xinca	2
Afro-Guatemalan	18
Ladino	1,590
Foreign	35

Mother Tongue (2018)
Spanish	7,510
Q'eqchi'	43,354
K'iche'	44
Mam	18
Kaqchikel	42
Other language	547

Literacy A7+ (2018)
yes	33,150
no	13,817

== Economic ==
- Agriculture is a significant activity in this area, with the cultivation of crops
  - Coffee
  - Corn
  - Beans
- Traditional crafts and artisan activities
- Central Square Market

== See also ==
- Fernando Romeo Lucas García
