= San Agustín Lanquín =

- Municipality of Guatemala
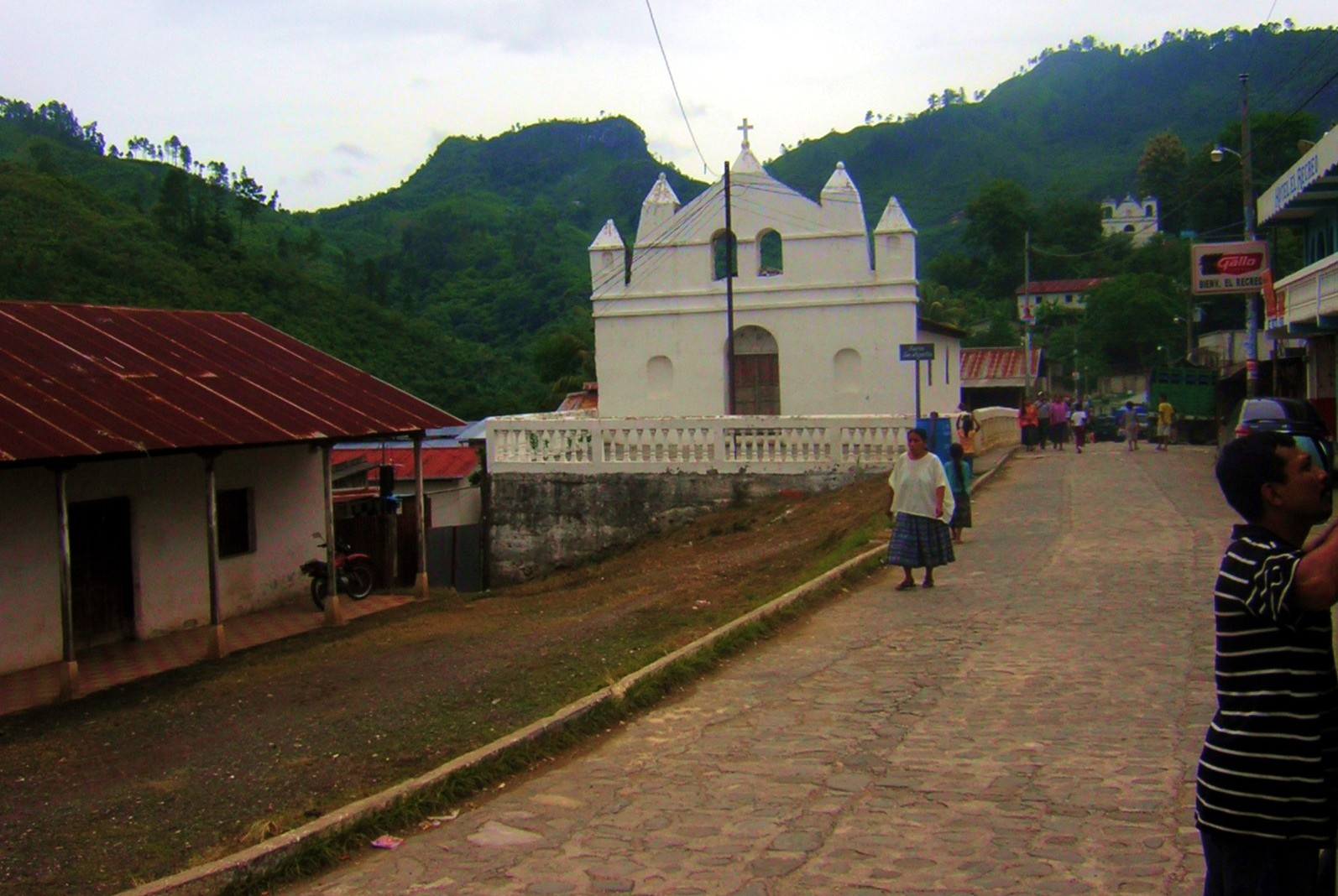
- Catholic Church of Lanquín

- Location in Guatemala
- Coordinates: 15°34′33″N 89°58′52″W
- Country: Guatemala
- Department: Alta Verapaz
- Municipality: Lanquín
- Founded: 1540

Government
  - Type: Municipal
  - Mayor: Lilian Irlanda Pop Coy (UNE)

Area
  - Total: 208 km^{2} (80 sq mi)
- Elevation: 380 m (1,250 ft)

Population (Census 2002)
  - Total: 16,546
  - Ethnicities: Q'eqchi' (95%) Ladino (5%)
  - Religions: Roman Catholicism Evangelicalism Maya
- Climate: Af
- Website: www.inforpressca.com/lanquin

San Agustín Lanquín (Spanish pronunciation: [san aɣusˈtin laŋˈkin]), often referred to simply as Lanquín, is a municipality in the Guatemalan department of Alta Verapaz. It lies at an altitude of 380 m (1,250 ft) above sea level. It has a population of about 16,500 people, many of Q'eqchi' Maya descent. It covers an area of 208 km².

== History ==
=== Settlement by the Order of Preachers ===
Lanquín, one of the native settlement conquered peacefully by the Order of Preachers -among them: Pedro de Angulo, O.P., Luis de Cáncer, O.P. and Rodrigo de la Cebra, O.P.- was established in 1540. In the 1540s, its first Catholic chapel was built, with the name of "San Agustín Lanquín". According to this historical records, it was elevated to the municipality category in 1846, and its first mayor was Crisanto Beb, honorable native.

=== 20th century ===
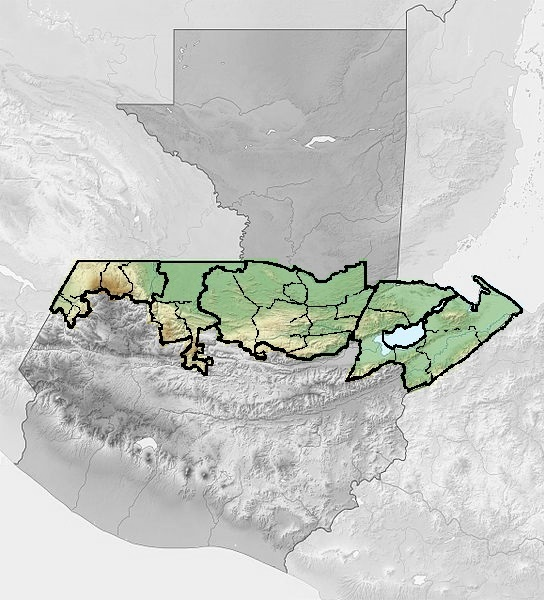
Location of Lanquín in Franja Transversal del Norte

In May 1956, an executive action by colonel coronel Carlos Castillo Armas declared Lanquín a National Park due to its natural beauty, which is one of the main tourist attractions in Guatemala. Later, in 1970, Lanquín was promoted to National Monument and, finally, in 1997 -by another executive action- it was declared as a National Cultural Patrimony.

In the 1960s, the importance of the region was in livestock, exploitation of precious export wood and archaeological wealth. Timber contracts we granted to multinational companies such as Murphy Pacific Corporation from California, which invested US$30 million for the colonization of southern Petén and Alta Verapaz, and formed the North Impulsadora Company. Colonization of the area was made through a process by which inhospitable areas of the Franja Transversal del Norte (FTN) were granted to native peasants.

In 1964, the National Institute for Agrarian Transformation (INTA) defined the geography of the FTN as the northern part of the departments of Huehuetenango, Quiché, Alta Verapaz and Izabal and that same year priests of the Maryknoll order and the Order of the Sacred Heart began the first process of colonization, along with INTA, carrying settlers from Huehuetenango to the Ixcán sector in Quiché.

The Northern Transversal Strip was officially created during the government of General Carlos Arana Osorio in 1970, by Decree 60-70 in the Congress, for agricultural development. The area included within the municipalities: San Ana Huista, San Antonio Huista, Nentón, Jacaltenango, San Mateo Ixtatán, and Santa Cruz Barillas in Huehuetenango; Chajul and San Miguel Uspantán in Quiché; Cobán, Chisec, San Pedro Carchá, Lanquín, Senahú, Cahabón and Chahal, in Alta Verapaz and the entire department of Izabal.

== Culture ==
The culture of the municipality is enriched by the q'eqchi' people's view of Cosmos and Nature, which has a strong influence in the community. The basic principle of the q'eqchi' culture is one of respect towards their surroundings -fauna and flora, in general-; however, in the later years, this principle is being threatened by other culture influences.

The concept of trust is important for business and all kind of transactions, being even more important than the judiciary and legal documents; this comes from the fact that the q'eqchi culture is one that assumes responsibility and considers that cleanliness, punctuality and respect are elements of trust.

== Religion ==
It is estimated that around 65% of the population is Roman Catholic, although there have been evangelical Christian settlements that have slowly grown in the area in the last twenty years.

The Q'eqchi population has kept its ancestral customs of communication with nature and cosmos; however, there is not a single statistical study of what portion of the population actually keeps the traditions alive, although it is clear that it has been decreasing rapidly. Within the municipality there are two known native altars, one in the Grutas and another one in Semuc Champey, although it is believed that town elders are aware of more important altars that they keep for themselves.

== Main celebration and annual fair ==
In Guatemala, the main human settlement celebrate their annual fair based on the Catholic Saint that is celebrated on the day the town was established. In general, these celebrations include fireworks, traditional food stands, children games, Christian celebrations and popular dances. In Lanquín, the annual fair takes place from 24 to 28 August, being the 28 the main event, since it is the date the Catholic Church celebrates Saint Augustine.

== Tourism ==
Al large cave complex known as Grutas de Lanquín is located at only one kilometer from the capital city of the municipality and 11 km south of Lanquín runs the Cahabon River and one can find the Semuc Champey natural monument. Lanquín is often the starting point of the tourist excursions to Semuc Champey.

== Gallery ==
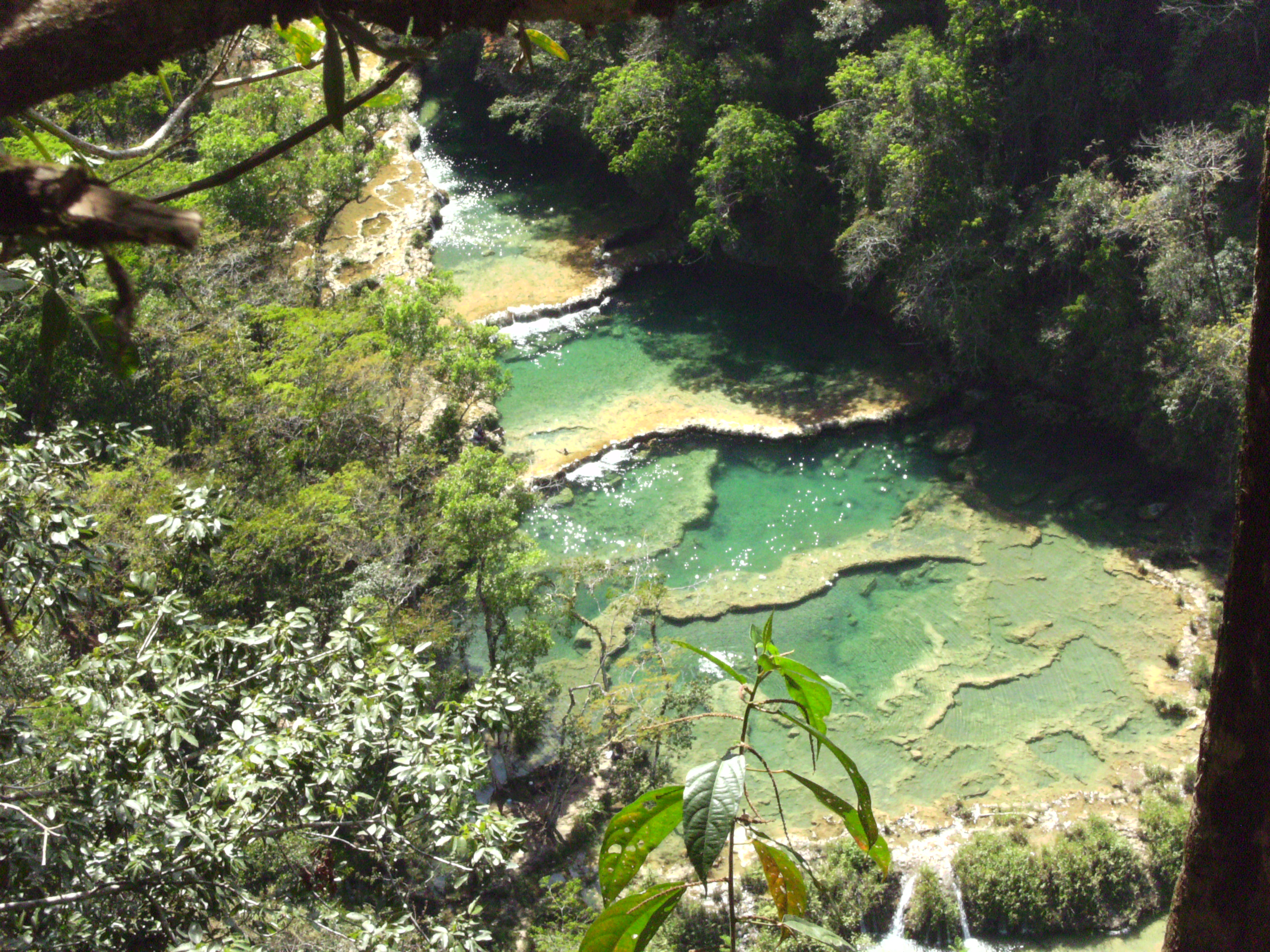
Cahabón River near Lanquin

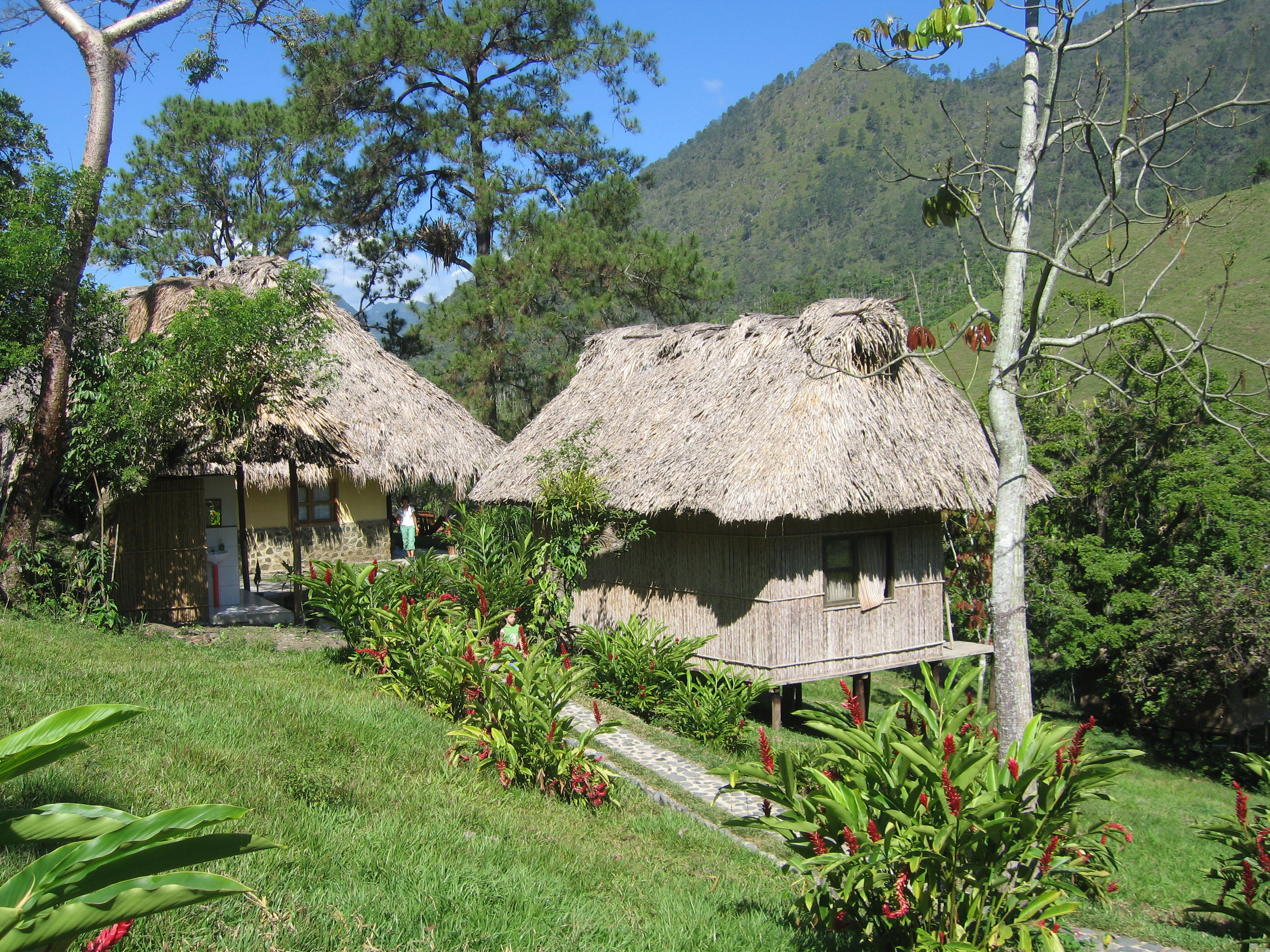
Landscape with cabin in Lanquin

== Climate ==
Lanquín has tropical rainforest climate (Köppen: Af).

Climate data for Lanquín
Month	Jan	Feb	Mar	Apr	May	Jun	Jul	Aug	Sep	Oct	Nov	Dec	Year
Mean daily maximum °C (°F)	27.5 (81.5)	29.4 (84.9)	30.7 (87.3)	32.3 (90.1)	32.1 (89.8)	31.8 (89.2)	30.6 (87.1)	31.0 (87.8)	30.9 (87.6)	30.1 (86.2)	28.7 (83.7)	27.7 (81.9)	30.2 (86.4)
Daily mean °C (°F)	23.2 (73.8)	24.1 (75.4)	25.4 (77.7)	26.8 (80.2)	27.1 (80.8)	27.1 (80.8)	26.5 (79.7)	26.6 (79.9)	26.5 (79.7)	25.9 (78.6)	24.6 (76.3)	23.3 (73.9)	25.6 (78.1)
Mean daily minimum °C (°F)	18.9 (66.0)	18.8 (65.8)	20.2 (68.4)	21.3 (70.3)	22.1 (71.8)	22.5 (72.5)	22.4 (72.3)	22.2 (72.0)	22.1 (71.8)	21.7 (71.1)	20.5 (68.9)	19.0 (66.2)	21.0 (69.8)
Average precipitation mm (inches)	140 (5.5)	85 (3.3)	83 (3.3)	104 (4.1)	186 (7.3)	419 (16.5)	439 (17.3)	331 (13.0)	383 (15.1)	336 (13.2)	216 (8.5)	149 (5.9)	2,871 (113)
Source: Climate-Data.org

== See also ==
- Alta Verapaz
- Grutas de Lanquín
- Semuc Champey
