= Alta Verapaz =

Department of Guatemala

Alta Verapaz Department Departamento de Alta Verapaz
- Department
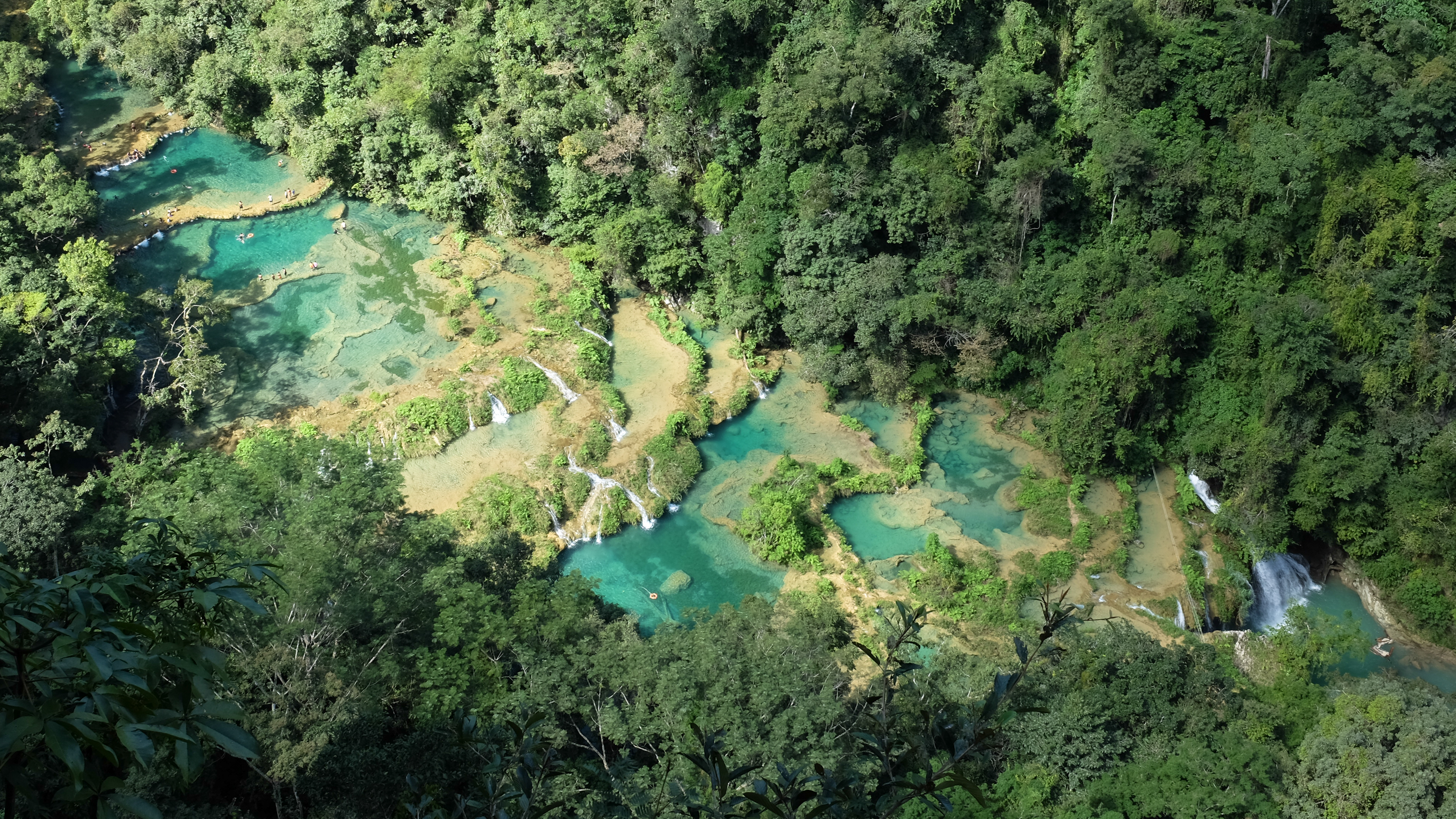
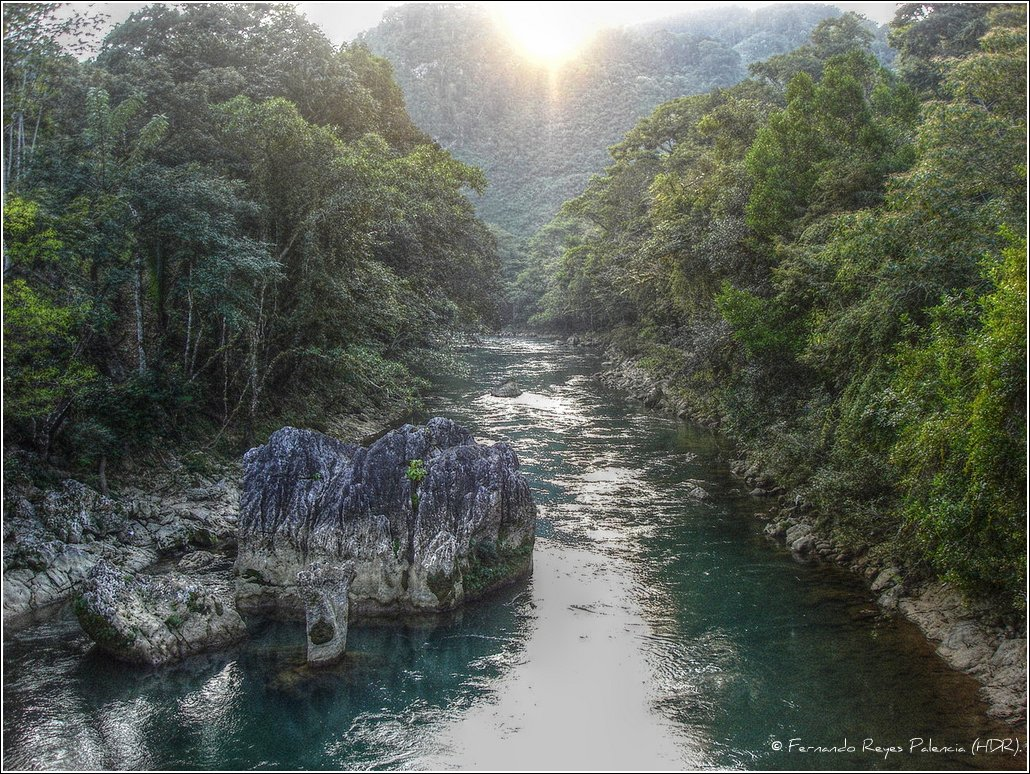
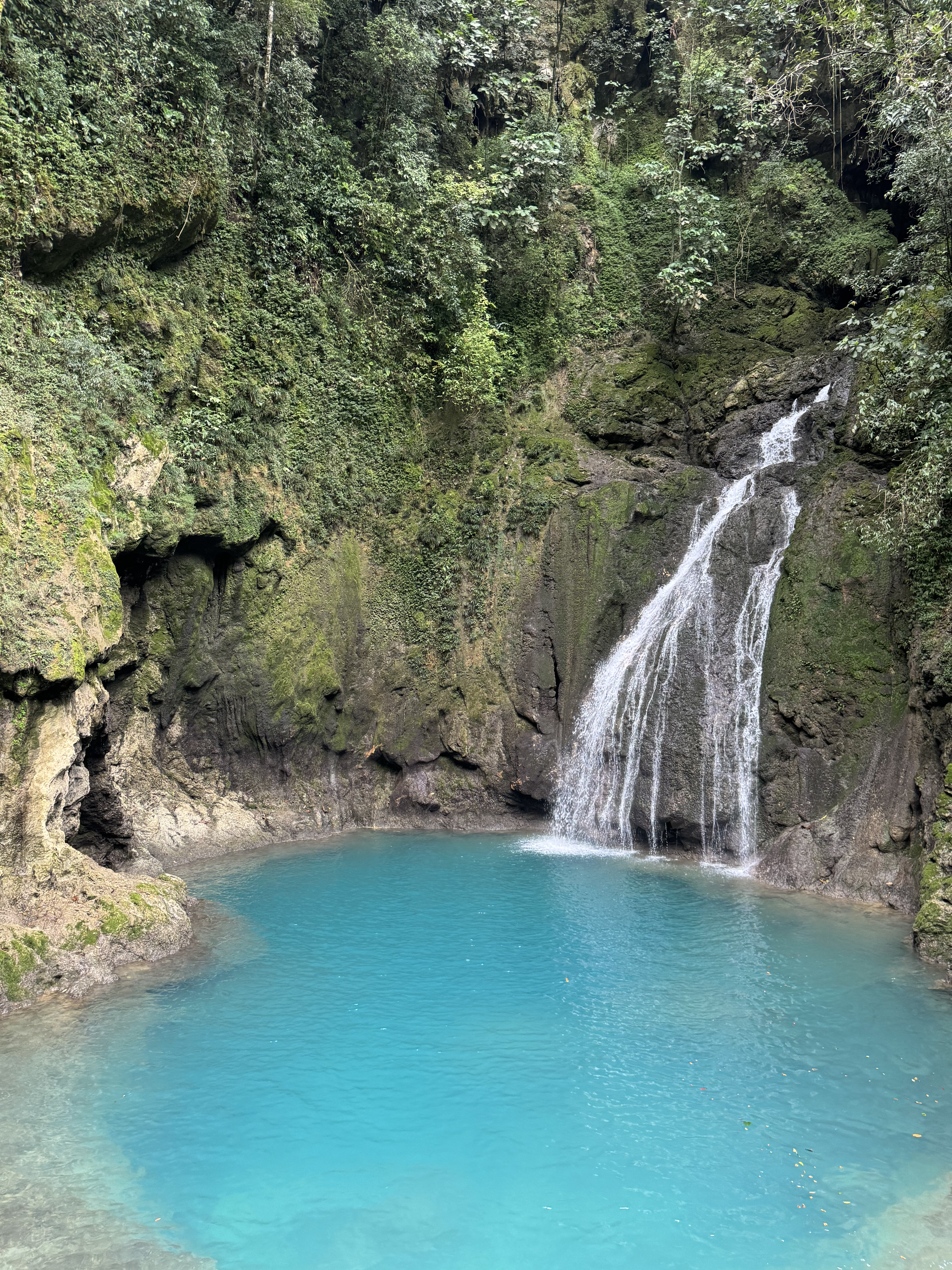
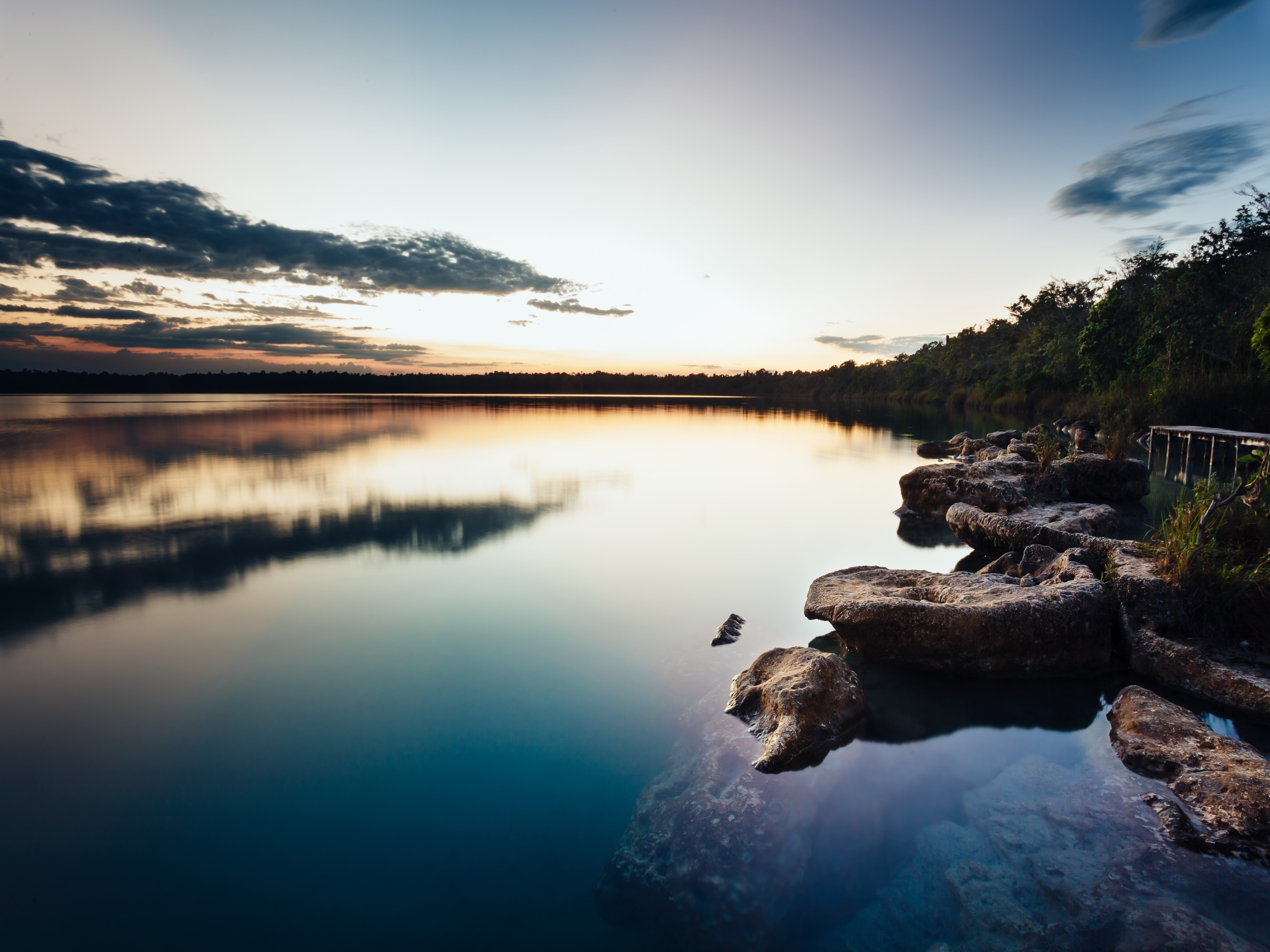
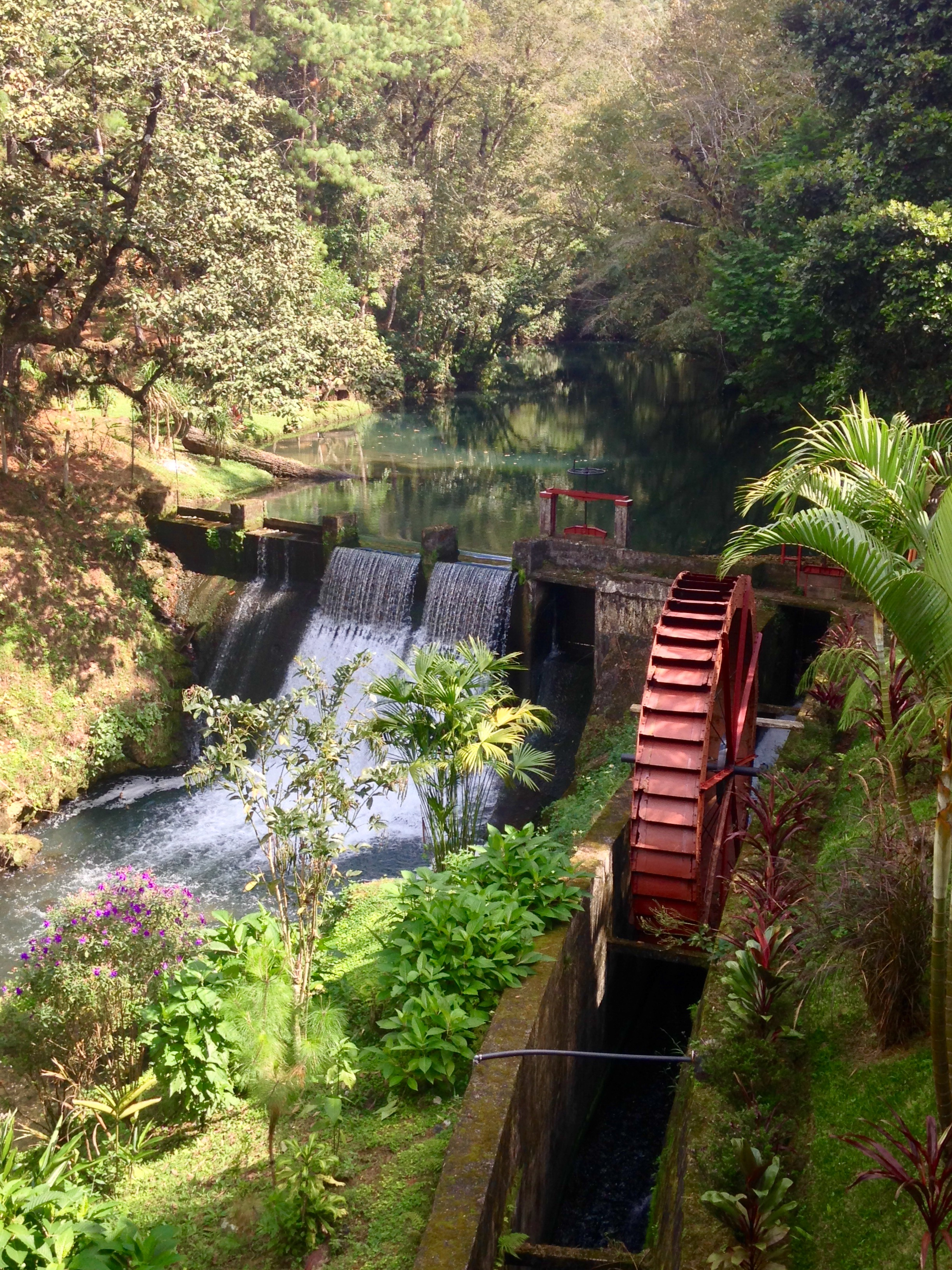
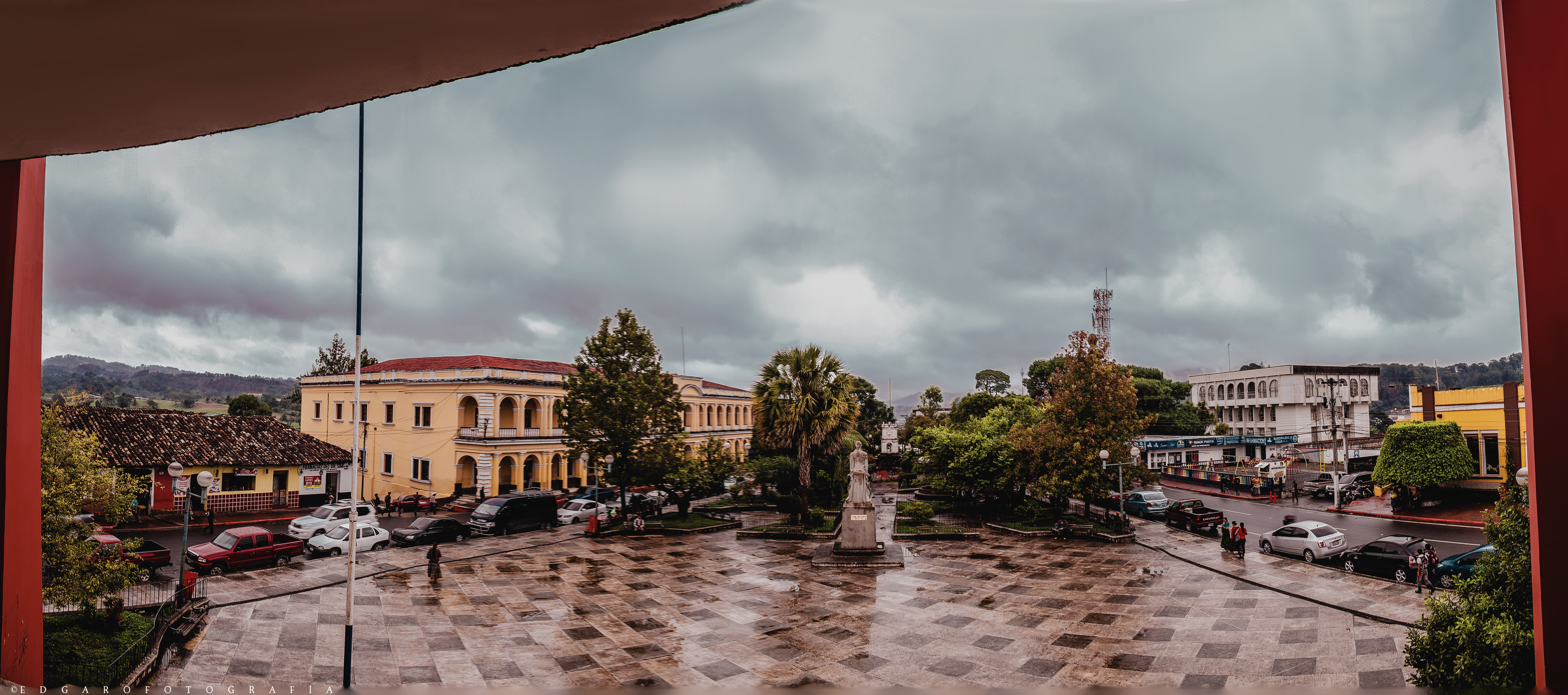
- Semuc Champey Cahabón River Sachichaj Reserve Lachuá Lake Finca La Aurora Cobán

- Flag Coat of arms

- Alta Verapaz
- Coordinates: 15°30′N 90°20′W
- Country: Guatemala
- Capital: Cobán
- Municipalities: 16

Government
  - Type: Departmental
  - Governor: Fernando Jeremías Rodríguez Klarck

Area
  - Department: 8,686 km^{2} (3,354 sq mi)
- Highest elevation: 2,800 m (9,200 ft)
- Lowest elevation: 300 m (980 ft)

Population (2018)
  - Department: 1,215,038
  - Rank: 2nd in Guatemala
  - Density: 139.9/km^{2} (362.3/sq mi)
  - Urban: 379,708
  - Ethnicities: Q'eqchi'; Poqomchiʼ; Ladino
  - Religions: Roman Catholicism; Evangelicalism; Maya
- Time zone: UTC-6
- ISO 3166 code: GT-AV

Alta Verapaz (Spanish pronunciation: [ˈalta βeɾaˈpas]) is a department in the north central part of Guatemala. The capital and chief city of the department is Cobán. Verapaz is bordered to the north by El Petén, to the east by Izabal, to the south by Zacapa, El Progreso, and Baja Verapaz, and to the west by El Quiché.

Also in Alta Verapaz are the towns of Chisec, San Pedro Carchá and San Cristóbal Verapaz.

== History ==
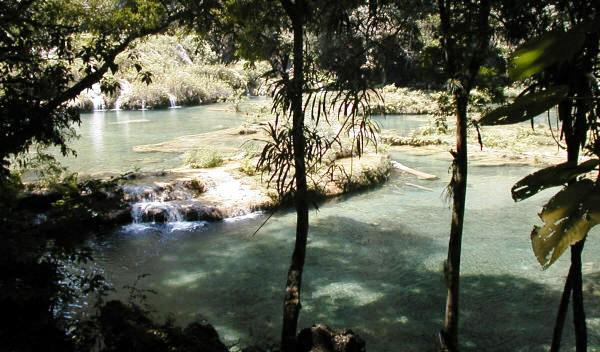
Semuc Champey pools in the Cahabòn River, Alta Verapaz, Guatemala

In pre-Columbian times, this area was part of the Maya civilization. When the Spanish Conquistadores came in the 1520s they conquered the central and southern highlands of Guatemala, but were driven back from this region by fierce native resistance. Unknown to the history books of this region, local oral history speaks of a former slave ship capsizing prior to the Spaniards arriving upon this area. The former African slaves moved inland, and joined forces with the local indigenous people to fight and maintain their freedom. Spanish friars succeeded in converting the area to Christianity, and named the area "Verapaz" meaning "True Peace". In the 19th century this became an important coffee producing region as well as a sugar cane plantation during prior centuries. A museum exists today highlighting the sugar plantation history. In this region of Guatemala, families that trace back their heritage before the Spanish conquest, can trace back their Mayan features and curly hair to that local oral history. Majority of pre-Columbian heritage is seen with straight black hair throughout Guatemala.

The department was called Vera Paz by the British in the 19th century. In 1850, the department had an estimated population of 66,000.

As a result of the Mexican drug war, the Los Zetas drug cartel members overtook much of the department and occupied many towns in December 2010. The Guatemalan government declared a state of siege on December 19, 2010, to reclaim the department, allowing the military and police forces to search and arrest any suspects without a warrant, and at least sixteen buildings were searched.

== Municipalities ==
1. Chahal
2. Chisec
3. Cobán
4. Fray Bartolomé de las Casas
5. Lanquín
6. Panzós
7. Raxruha
8. San Cristóbal Verapaz
9. San Juan Chamelco
10. San Pedro Carchá
11. Santa Cruz Verapaz
12. Santa María Cahabón
13. Senahú
14. Tactic
15. Tamahú
16. Tucurú
17. Santa Catalina la Tinta
