= August 1976 =

Month in 1976

<<	August 1976					>>
Su	Mo	Tu	We	Th	Fr	Sa
1	2	3	4	5	6	7
8	9	10	11	12	13	14
15	16	17	18	19	20	21
22	23	24	25	26	27	28
29	30	31

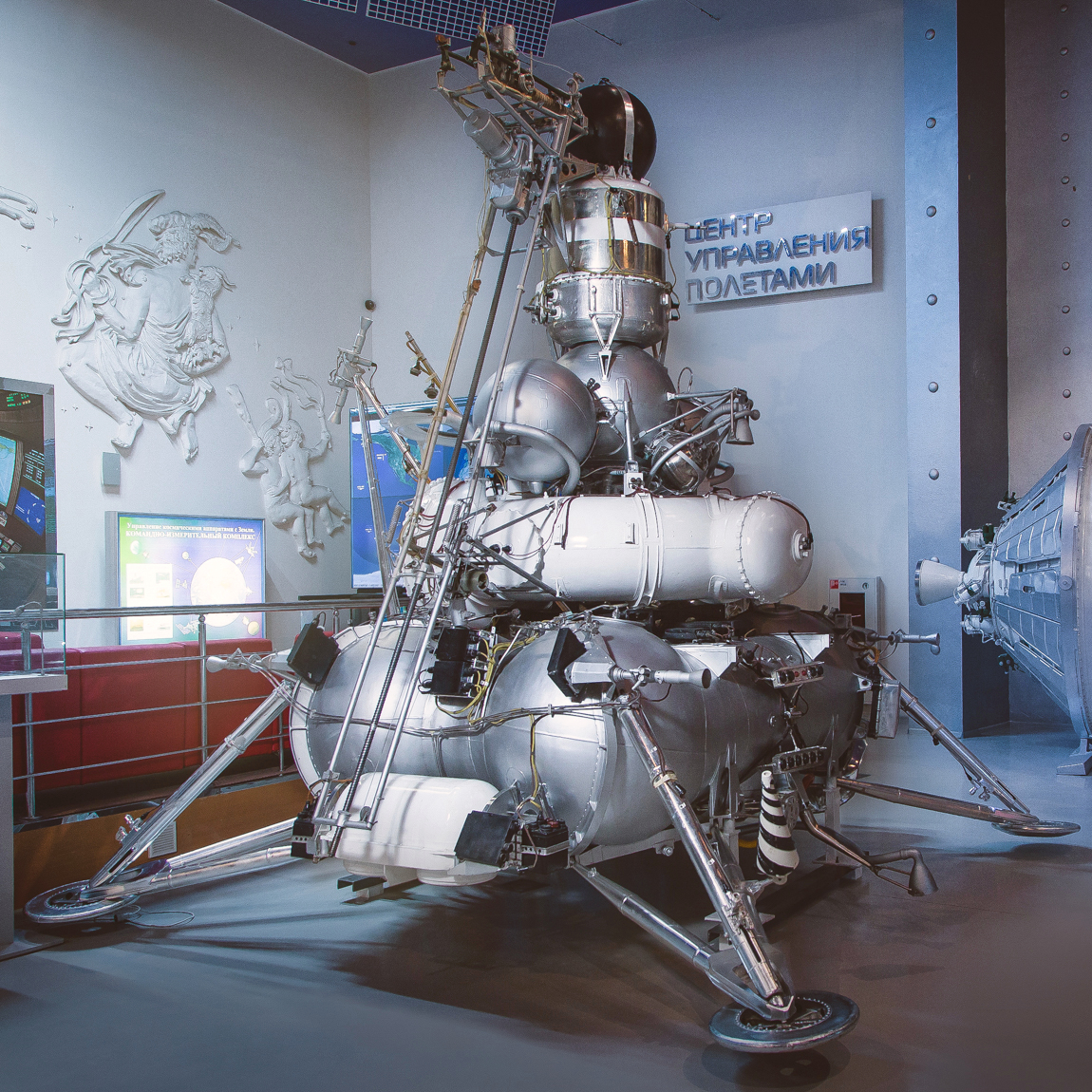
August 22, 1976: Luna 24 lander brings moon rocks back to the Soviet Union

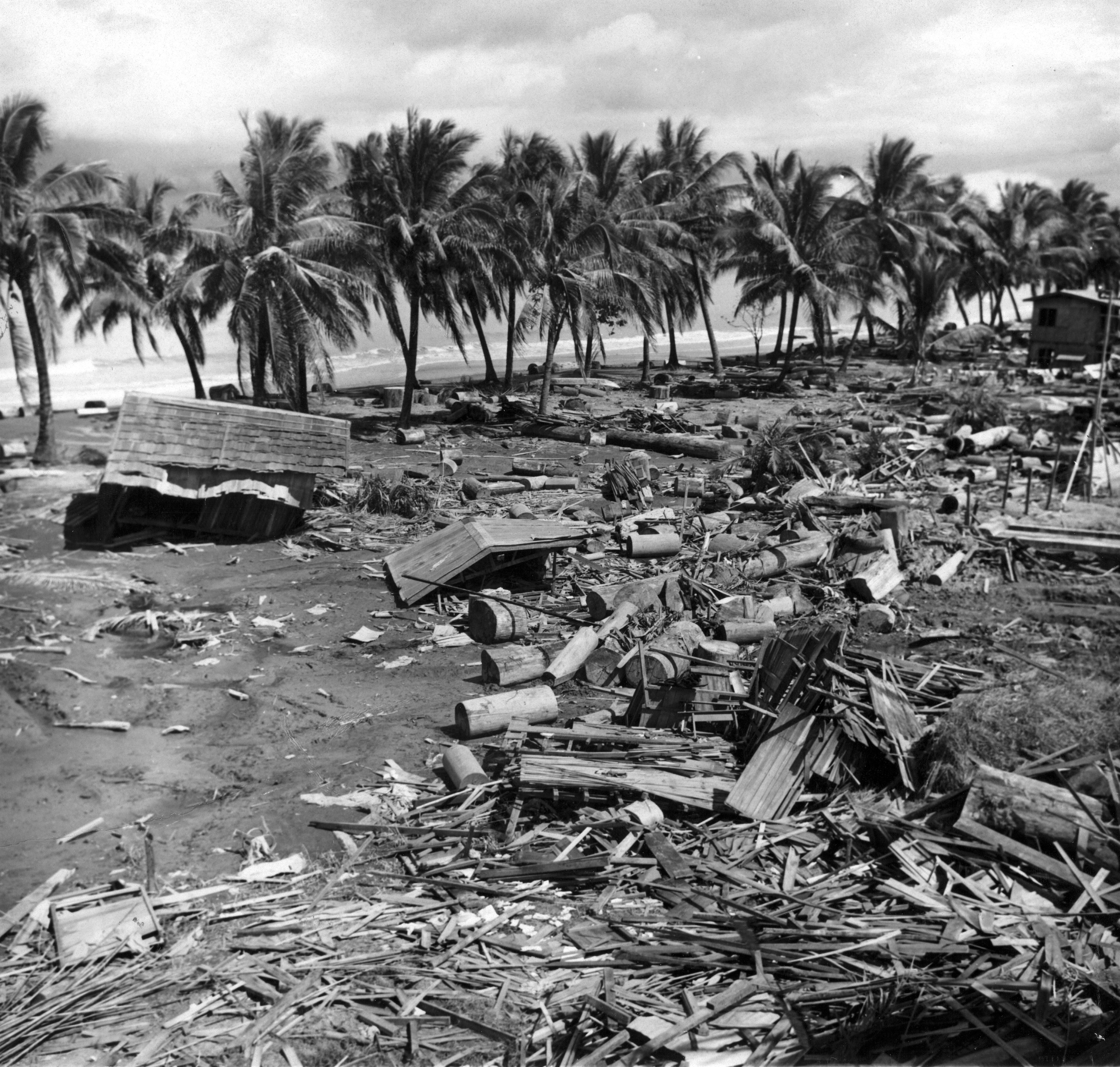
August 17, 1976: Tsunami kills more than 5,000 people in the Philippines

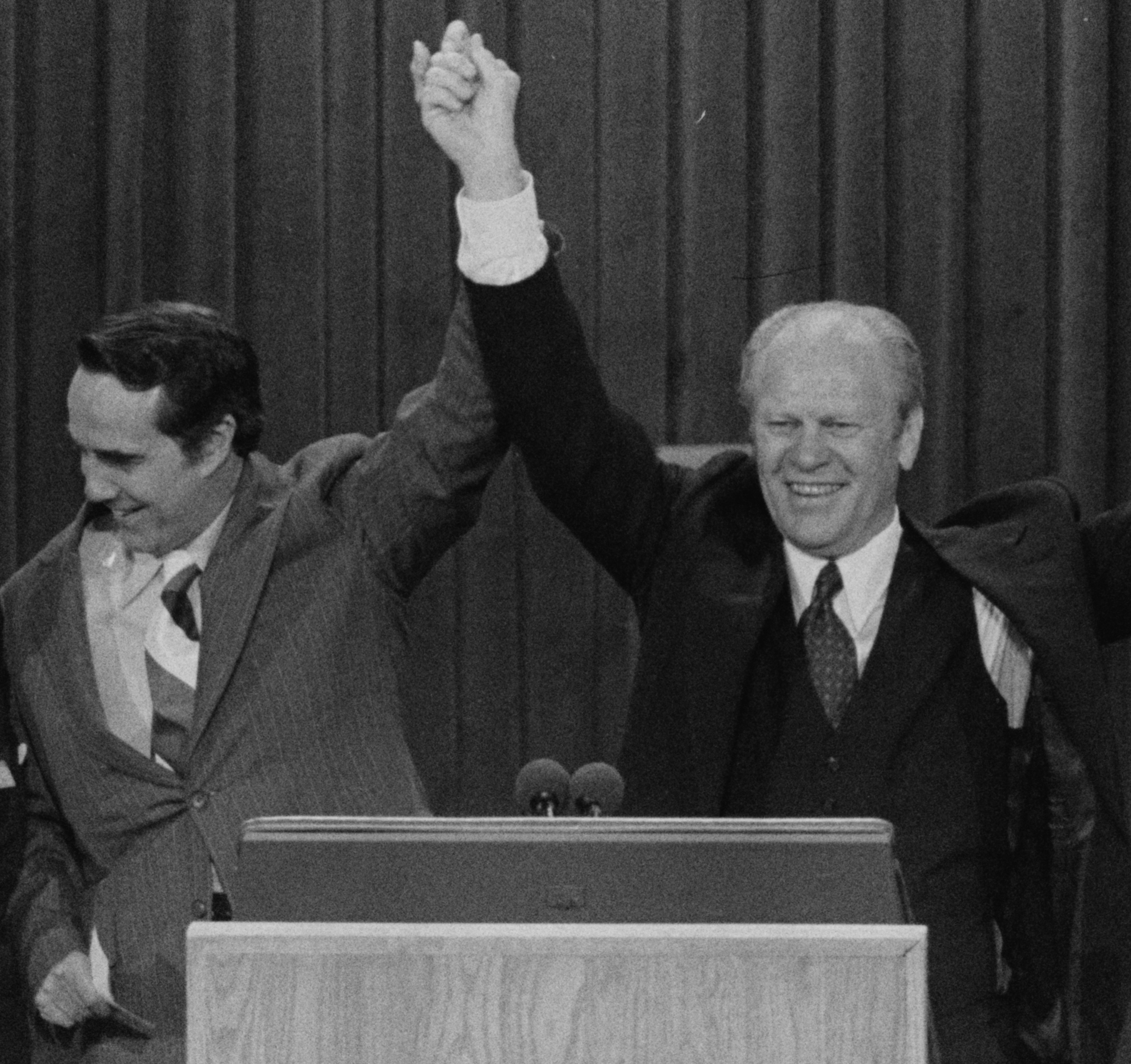
August 19, 1976: U.S. President Gerald Ford (pictured with running mate Bob Dole) narrowly wins Republican nomination over Ronald Reagan

== August 1, 1976 (Sunday) ==
- Trinidad and Tobago became a republic, with the Governor-General, Sir Ellis Clarke, becoming the first President. Clarke, who had previously served as the head of state as representative of Queen Elizabeth II, said that he would hold the office of president until the Caribbean island nation could elect a successor.
- Defending F1 World Champion Niki Lauda suffered extensive burns in an accident in the German Grand Prix that nearly cost him his life. Fellow racer Arturo Merzario of Italy pulled Lauda from the flaming automobile and saved his life.
- The United Nations High Commission on Refugees arranged for the evacuation of 49 U.S. citizens and their dependents from Vietnam, as the new Communist government allowed a chartered Air France flight from Tan Son Nhut airport near Ho Chi Minh City (formerly Saigon) to Bangkok. The group of 23 U.S.-born Americans and 14 spouses and 14 children had been stranded in South Vietnam when Saigon fell to the Communists on April 30, 1975, and most had waited for more than a year for permission to leave. A few of the Americans said that they "had pleaded to no effect to be allowed to stay in Vietnam," while three others had been held in the Chi Hua Prison
- Syria's Prime Minister Mahmoud al-Ayyubi resigned after almost four years in office, and President Hafez al-Assad appointed Ayyubi's predecessor, retired Major General Abdul Rahman Khleifawi to replace him.
- In Austria, Vienna's Reichsbrücke (translated as the "Empire Bridge") collapsed without warning into the Danube River, blocking river traffic and causing almost constant traffic jams within the city. The fall of the bridge, only 42 years old, occurred at around 5:00 in the morning and the structure was not crowded, but the driver of one vehicle was killed. A wider replacement bridge would open two years later, despite original forecasts that there would not be a substitute before 1981.
- The 1976 Summer Olympics ended in Montreal. Among the events that took place on the final day of competition, Waldemar Cierpinski of East Germany won the marathon. Teófilo Stevenson of Cuba (who had beaten his other opponents in two rounds or fewer) won the heavyweight boxing gold medal in the third round against Romania's Mircea Șimon, and East Germany beat Poland, 3 to 1, to win the soccer competition.
- The Seattle Seahawks played their first American football game, a preseason contest at the Kingdome against the visiting San Francisco 49ers, and lost 27 to 20. The 49ers had played as the "home team" in Seattle for preseason games six times in the 20 years before the Seahawks were founded.
- Born:
  - Iván Duque Márquez, President of Colombia since 2018; in Bogotá
  - Amar Upadhyay, Indian TV and film actor known for the soap opera Kyunki Saas Bhi Kabhi Bahu Thi and Molkki; in Ahmedabad, Gujarat state
  - Nwankwo Kanu, Nigerian soccer football forward for the Nigerian national team which won the 1996 Olympic gold medal, as well as for England's premier league for Arsenal and Portsmouth, and in the Netherlands for Ajax Amsterdam; in Owerri, Imo State

== August 2, 1976 (Monday) ==
- A gunman murdered Andrea Wilborn and Stan Farr and injured Priscilla Davis and Gus Gavrel, in an incident at Priscilla's mansion in Fort Worth, Texas. T. Cullen Davis, Priscilla's husband and one of the richest men in Texas, was tried and found not guilty for Andrea's murder, involvement in a plot to kill several people (including Priscilla and a judge), and was exonerated from a wrongful death lawsuit. Cullen went broke afterwards.
- Alexander Agyeman of Ghana was installed as the traditional ruler of the Akyem people in Ghana's Eastern Region, and crowned as King Osagyefo Kuntunkununku II.
- Born:
  - Sam Worthington, English-born Australian film star known for Avatar and Clash of the Titans; in Godalming, Surrey
  - Nigamananda Saraswati, Indian Hindu monk who went on an ultimately-fatal hunger strike to call attention to the pollution of the Ganges River; in Darbhanga, Bihar state (d. 2011)
- Died:
  - Fritz Lang, 85, Austrian-born film producer known for Metropolis and The Big Heat.
  - Monroe J. Rathbone, 76, President of the largest U.S. oil company, Standard Oil Company of New Jersey (now the Exxon Corporation) from 1953 to 1965

== August 3, 1976 (Tuesday) ==
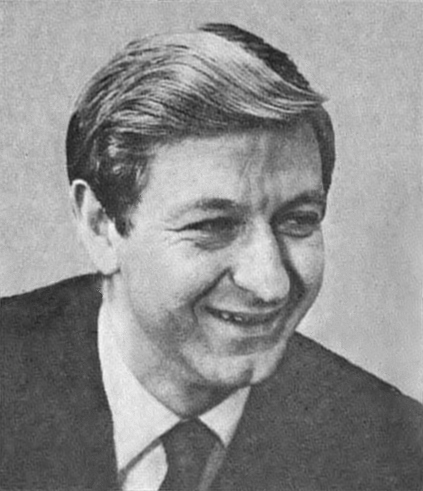
Congressman Litton

- U.S. Congressman Jerry Litton of Missouri won the Democratic nomination for U.S. Senator, then died in a plane crash while flying to a victory party to celebrate his victory. Litton, his wife and their two children, and the pilot and a co-pilot were on a twin-engine Beechcraft airplane that lifted off from the airport in Chillicothe, Missouri shortly after 9:00 p.m., then crashed 19 seconds later after a crankshaft broke in the left engine. The airplane, which had been chartered to fly to a victory party in Kansas City, plummeted into a soybean field and exploded on impact, killing all six people on board.
- Valery Sablin, a Soviet Navy officer who had led a mutiny in 1975 on the anti-submarine ship Storozhevoy on November 8, 1975, was executed after being found guilty of treason in a court-martial.
- Born: Anoop Menon, Indian film actor, screenwriter and director in Malayalam films; in Kozhikode, Kerala state

== August 4, 1976 (Wednesday) ==
- The government of Sudan executed 81 people who had been summarily tried and convicted of participation in a July 2 attempt to overthrow the government of Jaafar Nimeiry. The next day, an additional 17 people were executed including former Sudanese Brigadier General Mohammed Nur Saeed, who had led the effort involving more than 1,000 troops who had been trained in Libyan camps.
- Roman Catholic Bishop Enrique Angelelli, of the diocese of La Rioja in Argentina, was assassinated by a group of people in two trucks. As he was returning from a Mass in the city of Chamical with another priest, Father Arturo Pinto, Angelelli's truck was forced off the road at the town of Punta de los Llanos. Pinto survived, but after recovering consciousness, he saw that Bishop Angelelli had been beaten to death. Local police described the death as an accident and closed the case. After the restoration of democracy in Argentina, a new investigation would conclude in 1986 that Angelelli had been murdered on orders from an Argentine Army officer.
- American serial killer and teenager Montie Rissell murdered the first of five female victims in the Washington, DC suburb of Alexandria, Virginia. After having sex with Aura Gabor, a 26-year-old prostitute who lived in the same apartment complex where he lived, he drowned her in a nearby ravine. In a period of nine months, he would rape 12 women and kill five of them before being arrested on May 18, 1977.
- The Sun Belt Conference, a group of college basketball in the southeastern United States, was formed by six universities. Only one of the original members, the University of South Alabama, remains in the now 12-member conference.
- Died: Lord Thomson of Fleet, Canadian-born British publishing mogul who built the Thomson Organization that owned The Times of London

== August 5, 1976 (Thursday) ==
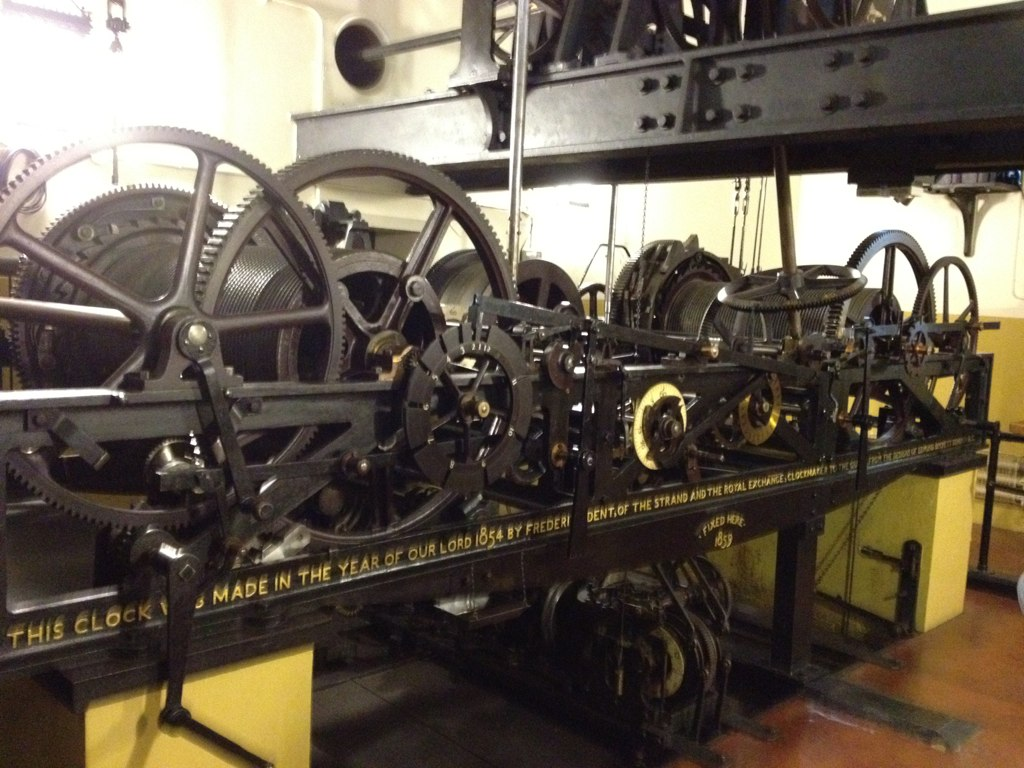
The clockworks halted attribution: Paulobrad

- Big Ben, the largest bell within London's Clock Tower of Westminster, failed to ring and the clock stopped at 3:45 in the morning after metal fatigue caused the machinery to stop running. Although the hands of the clock's four faces were soon operating again after the repairs made by Westminster's chief engineer, Geoffrey Buggin, a winding drum fell off, breaking the 110-year-old chiming mechanism. The bells of Big Ben— which had operated regularly since 1859— would be require multiple repairs over the next nine months, but restored in time for the silver Jubilee of Queen Elizabeth's coronation in May.
- An explosion at an underground mine in Yugoslavia's Bosnian republic, at Breza, killed 17 of the 118 workers underground. The blast occurred at a depth of 600 feet (180 m).
- As part of the American Basketball Association–National Basketball Association merger, a dispersal draft was conducted for teams to pick the players who had been under contract for the two ABA franchises which had folded, the Kentucky Colonels and the Spirits of St. Louis (who had announced that they would play in Salt Lake City as the "Utah Rockies" if there was a 1976-77 ABA season). The Chicago Bulls, who had had the worst record during the 1975–76 NBA season, selected Artis Gilmore of the Colonels as the first pick overall; the Bulls had drafted Gilmore in the seventh round of the 1971 NBA draft. Twelve players were selected overall by the 23 NBA teams, with 11 teams electing not to draft anyone at all.
- Born:
  - May Sabai Phyu, Myanmar feminist and human rights activist; in Rangoon, Burma (now Yangon, Myanmar)
  - Napoleon Beazley, American murderer known for being executed for a killing committed as a juvenile; in Grapeland, Texas (d. 2002)
- Died:
  - Mapetla Mohapi, 28, black South African inmate who was the first person to be detained under Section 6 of the new Terrorism Act, was found dead in his cell, supposedly strangled by a pair of jeans. A purported suicide note was later shown to have been a forgery.
  - Singer, Entertainer Betty Clooney (Jack Paar Show) died suddenly on August 5, 1976, aged 45, in Las Vegas, Nevada, from a brain aneurysm. She was the younger sister of Rosemary Clooney, aunt to George Clooney.
  - Dr. Fager, 12, American thoroughbred racehorse and 1968 American Horse of the Year, after winning seven major races that year.

== August 6, 1976 (Friday) ==
- The Indian state of Maharashtra became the first governmental unit to enact legislation mandating compulsory sterilization of men and women, passing the Family (Restrictions on Size) Bill on its third reading and sending it to the President of India for the required assent. The President reacted favorably and sent the bill back to the Maharashtra government with suggested amendments that would be necessary for an enactment, but before the measure could be passed, new elections were called and the legislation was not passed. Under the terms of the bill, "couples with three or more living children" (with the exception of all boys or all girls) were required "to submit one parent for sterilization or face six months in jail." More specifically, the law obligated men up to the age of 55 to receive a vasectomy "within 180 days of the birth of their third living child", except if a vasectomy would endanger the man's life, in which case a woman up to age 45 would have to submit to a tubal ligation. The national government's incentive program, however, reportedly resulted in a 200 percent increase in sterilizations compared to 1975.
- Former UK Postmaster General John Stonehouse was sentenced to 7 years' jail for fraud, theft and forgery.
- Born:
  - Travis Kalanick, American entrepreneur who co-founded the internet taxi and delivery company Uber in 2009; in Los Angeles
  - Soleil Moon Frye, American TV actress known as the star of Punky Brewster; in Glendora, California
  - Melissa George, Australian-born American film and TV actress; in Perth, Western Australia
- Died:
  - Gregor Piatigorsky, 73, Russian-born American cellist
  - Maria Klenova, 77, Soviet Russian marine geologist and Arctic explorer

== August 7, 1976 (Saturday) ==
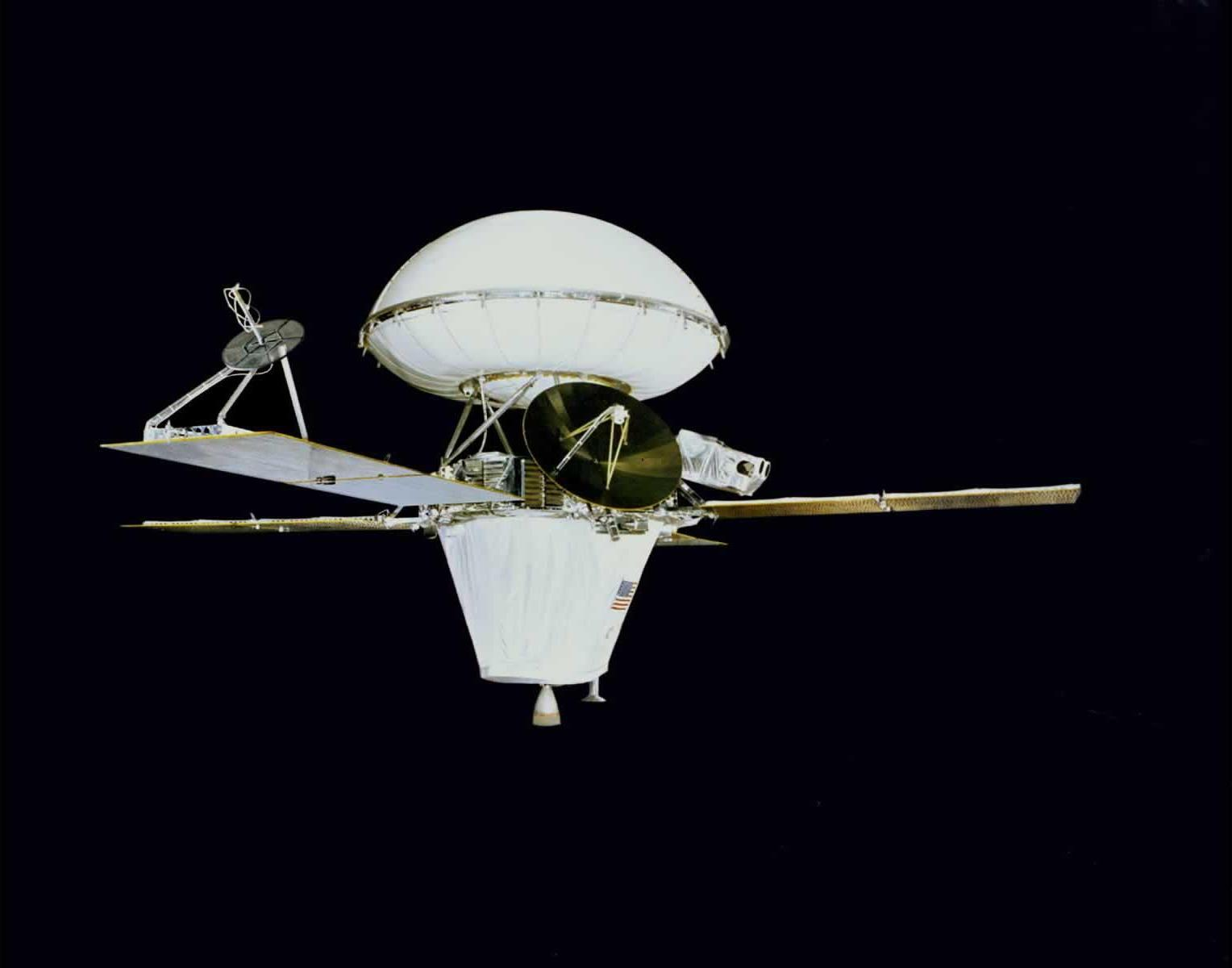
The Viking 2 orbiter

- Viking 2 entered into orbit around Mars.
- The Republic of the North Solomons, whose residents had declared their independence from the Australian-administered Territory of Papua and New Guinea on September 1, 1975, abandoned its secession. The unrecognized republic, consisting of Bougainville Island and Buka Island, joined the now independent nation of Papua New Guinea as the "North Solomons Province", and the republic's president, Alexis Sarei, became the province's premier.
- The decomposing body of former Chicago mobster John Roselli was found by two fishermen in Florida's Biscayne Bay, 10 days after he had disappeared. Roselli had last been seen on July 28, when he departed from his sister's home in Plantation, Florida, to play golf. His car had been found a few days later at the Miami International Airport. According to the deputy chief medical examiner for Dade County, Roselli's body had been packed into an oil barrel that had been chopped with holes and weighed down with chains to sink to the bottom of the sea, but "Gases formed by the decomposition and trapped inside body tissue and the barrel had brought it to the surface." Referring to Roselli's killers, Dr. Ronald Wright told reporters "These guys went to an incredible amount of trouble trying to make sure the body was never found."
- The charred body of a person identified by his family as David Graiver, an Argentine banker accused of embezzlement, money laundering, and assistance to the Montoneros leftist guerrilla group, was found in the wreckage of a Dassault Falcon 888AR business jet on a hillside near Acapulco in Mexico. Mexican investigators never took fingerprints of the remains found in the crash, consisting of "three severed hands", and Graiver was only confirmed by his relatives from "a piece of torso and a fragment of shirt", and the remains were later cremated, leading investigators to doubt that he had actually died.
- Apsarasas Kangri, at 23,770 feet (7,250 m) the 96th highest mountain in the world, was climbed for the first time. Yoshio Inagaki, Katsuhisa Yabuta and Takamasa Miyomoto of the Osaka University Mountaineering Club of Japan made the first ascent, reaching the peak over the west ridge.
- Born: Karen Olivo, American stage actress; in the South Bronx, New York City

== August 8, 1976 (Sunday) ==
- An intoxicated Soviet border guard shot and killed six members of a group of Estonian gas company employees, and wounded 14 others, after getting into an argument with members who were having a picnic at the scenic Cape Letitpea park on the Gulf of Finland. The shooting took place near the village of Kunda in the Estonian SSR, at the time a part of the Soviet Union. Information about the crime was not reported in the Soviet-controlled press, but a monument would be placed at the site on the 15th anniversary of the killing in the final year of the Soviet Union's existence.
- Defying more than 100 years of professional baseball tradition, the Chicago White Sox became the first team to wear short pants for summer games, defeating the visiting Kansas City Royals, 5 to 2, while dressed in Bermuda shorts. The unpopular innovation was the idea of White Sox owner Bill Veeck. The Sox played in shorts again on August 21 and August 22 before retiring the uniforms on their way to one of their worst seasons ever, finishing with 64 wins and 98 losses.
- Seven children ranging from 3 to 8 years old were killed, along with two adults, when a train struck the church bus they were on in the town of Stratton, Nebraska. Eight other children on the bus were hospitalized. All of the victims were local residents being driven by their pastor and his wife to Sunday school at the Stratton Church of Christ.

== August 9, 1976 (Monday) ==
- Operation Eland, an invasion of Mozambique by Rhodesia to combat the Zimbabwe African National Liberation Army (ZANLA) began with an attack on the Pusgue refugee camp near Nyadzonya, and ultimately killed 1,028 people, most of them civilians.
- Giulio Carlo Argan, a professor of art history at Sapienza, Rome's nearly eight-century-old university, was selected as the first Communist mayor of Rome, "completing a Marxist takeover of the major city halls in Italy" in the wake of recent legislative elections in which the PCI had won the second highest number of seats in the Chamber of Deputies. The Communists agreed to forgo participation in the national government in return for support by the Christian Democracy party and the Italian Socialist Party for rule on the local level. Argan, who took a leave from his job as the University of Rome, was selected by vote of the City Council rather than by direct vote.
- Luna 24 was the third attempt to recover a sample from the unexplored Mare Crisium (Sea of Crises), the location of a large lunar mascon (after Luna 23 and a launch failure in October 1975) The mission returned 170.1 g (6.00 oz) of lunar samples on 22 August 1976.
- The bodies of two murder victims, Pamela Buckley and James Freund, were found near Lake City, South Carolina and would remain unidentified for more than 40 years until discovered through the work of the DNA Doe Project.
- Born:
  - Jessica Capshaw, American TV actress and a regular on The Practice and in Grey's Anatomy; in Columbia, Missouri
  - Rhona Mitra, English TV actress and a regular on The Practice and in Boston Legal; in Paddington, London
- Died: José Lezama Lima, 65, Cuban novelist and poet

== August 10, 1976 (Tuesday) ==
- Hurricane Belle hit Long Island and southern New England. Twelve people were killed by the storm and damage was $100 million.
- The government of Australia established the resort town of Yulara in the Northern Territory in order to protect Ayers Rock and provide tourist accommodations near the Uluṟu-Kata Tjuṯa National Park. The proclamation was made by Evan Adermann, the Minister for the Northern Territory.
- India's Parliament convened in New Delhi with most of the opposition party members boycotting the session. Prime Minister Indira Gandhi's Congress Party held the overwhelming majority of the 521 seats in Lok Sabha, with 352 overall or more than two-thirds, and planned to enact amendments to the constitution to enhance Mrs. Gandhi's authoritarian powers.
- Annie, one of the most successful musicals of the 1970s, was given its premiere performance, making its debut off-Broadway at the Goodspeed Opera House in East Haddam, Connecticut, with 13-year-old Kristen Vigard in the title role and 12-year-old Andrea McArdle as one of Annie's fellow orphans. After one week, McArdle replaced Vigard as Annie prior to the musical's Broadway debut on April 21, 1977.
- Died:
  - Ray "Crash" Corrigan (stage name for Raymond Benitz), 74, American film actor and stuntman known for the "Tucson Smith" and "Crash Corrigan" series of B-movie westerns
  - Karl Schmidt-Rottluff, 91, German expressionist painter
  - Jimmy Casella, 52, American gambler and primary money-winner of the 1974 World Series of Poker, died of a drug overdose.

== August 11, 1976 (Wednesday) ==
- Thirteen people were killed and seven injured as a fire swept through the six-floor Hotel d'Amerique in Paris. Most of the victims were immigrant workers from Morocco and Algeria. As with most hotels in France at the time, the hotel had no fire escape; nine people died in their rooms or in hallways while two others died after jumping from their rooms. The blaze was the most deadly of five low-rate hotel fires that had been deliberately set since June.
- A pair of terrorists attacked a group of airline passengers waiting to board El Al Flight 582 at Istanbul's Yesilkoy Airport, where they were planning to fly to Tel Aviv in Israel. Four passengers— two Israelis, one Japanese and one Spaniard— were killed and 20 others wounded when the guerrillas threw hand grenades and fired submachine guns.
- A sniper entered the downtown Holiday Inn in Wichita, Kansas (at the time the tallest building in the U.S. state of Kansas), carried two rifles and ammunition in an elevator to the 26th floor, walked into an unlocked empty room and fired from a balcony. During an 11-minute rampage that began at 2:54 in the afternoon, the 19-year-old gunman shot nine people, killing three and wounding six others before police shot and wounded him. One of the dead was a freelance photographer who was driving to the scene after hearing that a crime was in progress.
- The fall of a meteor was observed at 11:00 in the morning in Mexico, north of Acapulco and a 1.914 kg (4.22 lb) meteorite was recovered 15 minutes later by witness Leodegario Cardenas. Examples of the acapulcoite, whose mineral composition is primarily olivine, orthopyroxene, plagioclase, meteoric iron, and troilite, would be found later in 86 other specimens whose fall to Earth was not observed.
- David Jimenez Sarmiento, alias "El Chano", leader of the Liga Comunista 23 de Septiembre rebels in Mexico, was shot and killed while he and three other members attempted to kidnap the sister of Mexico's President. Margarita López Portillo, sister of incoming President José López Portillo, was being driven through Mexico City when three men and a woman emerged from a taxicab ahead of them and fired on the car, which crashed into a drug store. Jimenez Sarmiento was killed in the gunbattle that followed, along with one of Margarita López's bodyguards.
- Born:
  - Ben Gibbard, American musician (Death Cab for Cutie, The Postal Service)
  - Will Friedle, American TV actor known for Boy Meets World and as a voice actor on animation; in Hartford, Connecticut
  - Tinsley Mortimer, American socialite and reality TV personality known for High Society and The Real Housewives of New York City; in Richmond, Virginia
- Died:
  - Robert L. May, 71, American advertising copywriter who created the character of Rudolph the Red-Nosed Reindeer as a giveaway book for the Montgomery Ward department store chain in 1939; May's brother-in-law, Johnny Marks, later adapted the story to a successful Christmas song.
  - Omer Poos, 73, United States District Judge for Illinois since 1958

== August 12, 1976 (Thursday) ==
- More than 1,500 Lebanese Palestinian refugees, and perhaps as many as 3,000, were killed in a massacre of civilians at the Tel al-Zaatar camp in northeastern Beirut by a Christian militia group. The camp had been created and administered by the United Nations Relief and Works Agency during the Lebanese Civil War and most of the men, women and children housed at Tel al-Zaatar were Palestinian Muslims.
- The trial of the San Quentin Six, the longest and most expensive in the U.S. state of California up to that time, came to an end after 16 months and a cost of more than two million dollars, "to convict three men who were already imprisoned, two with life sentences." The six prisoners on trial had been charged with an escape attempt that had killed six people almost five years earlier on August 21, 1971. Three defendants— Fleeta Drumgo, Luis Talamantez and Willie Tate— were acquitted of all charges and, having served out their original sentences at San Quentin for other crimes, paroled afterward. Johnny Spain, already serving a life sentence for a 1967 murder, was convicted of the 1971 murder, but his conviction would be overturned on appeal and he would be released in 1988. David Johnson and Hugo Pinell were convicted of assaulting guards. Johnson would be released in 1993. Pinell, who had already been serving a life sentence for murder of prison guard at the Soledad prison, would be killed in a prison riot on August 12, 2015, thirty-nine years after the verdict.
- An explosion killed 12 maintenance workers at a 30-story tall tower at the Tenneco Oil Company refinery in Chalmette, Louisiana, and injured 14 others. All but two of the dead were subcontractor employees of the Delta Field Erection Company. An official of the International Brotherhood of Boilermakers, to which the 10 Delta Field employees belonged, said that the blast had been caused by human error, noting "It was just a mistake on a man's part."
- The National Swine Flu Immunization Program, meant to vaccinate all 200 million residents of the U.S. against swine flu, was signed into law by U.S. President Gerald Ford.
- Died:
  - Tom Driberg, 71 controversial British House of Commons member who served as an MP from 1942 to 1955, and 1959 to 1974, despite having been a former member of the Communist Party of Great Britain and being openly gay. Driberg, who had been ennobled as "Lord Bradwell of Bradwell Juxta Mare" in December, was dead on arrival at a hospital after collapsing in a taxi cab at Bayswater, London.
  - Roger Q. Williams, 82, American aviator and aircraft designer

== August 13, 1976 (Friday) ==
- Democrat Joseph DiCarlo and Republican Ronald MacKenzie, both Massachusetts state senators and partners in crime, were indicted by a federal grand jury and arrested on charges of extortion of $40,000 from a consulting company, McKee-Berger-Mansueto, Inc. After posting bond, both would be convicted by a jury on February 25, fined, and sentenced to one year confinement at a minimum security prison near Allenwood, Pennsylvania. MacKenzie would resign on March 30, 1977, while DiCarlo would become the first legislator in state history to be expelled from office, losing his seat on April 4 by a 28 to 8 vote.
- Died: Liz Moore, 31, British sculptor known for her elaborate designs of film props and miniatures in Star Wars and 2001: A Space Odyssey, was killed in a car accident in the Netherlands. She had been working on the film set of the war movie A Bridge Too Far.

== August 14, 1976 (Saturday) ==
- Eight people were killed and 51 injured in Egypt by a bomb that exploded on a train that they were boarding at the Alexandria railway station. Most of the casualties were construction workers and farmers who were preparing to make the 700 mi (1,100 km) trip to their workplaces in Aswan. Egypt accused Libya of having had someone plant the time bomb, which exploded at 10:45 in the morning, in an unclaimed suitcase in a luggage rack. Casualties would have been higher but the train was still waiting outside of the station when the bomb exploded, and the people killed had boarded in order to get an early seat.
- Around 10,000 Protestant and Catholic women demonstrated for peace in Northern Ireland.
- The Senegalese political party PAI-Rénovation was recognized by the West African nation's government, becoming the third legal party in that West African nation.

== August 15, 1976 (Sunday) ==
- All 59 people aboard SAETA Flight 232 were killed in Ecuador when the Vickers Viscount 785D disappeared while flying from Quito to Cuenca, 193 miles (311 km) to the south. The last radio contact from Flight 232 came 21 minutes after its takeoff at 8:06 in the morning; at 8:27, the pilot reported being over Ambato at an altitude of 18,000 feet (5,500 m). The four-engine Viscount airplane, along with its 55 passengers and four crew, would remain missing in the Andes for more than 26 years until October 17, 2002, when a group of mountain climbers came across its wreckage while attempting to scale the Chimborazo volcano.
- The government of France ordered the mass evacuation of 72,000 people living in seven communities on Basse-Terre Island, part of France's overseas department of Guadeloupe in the Caribbean Sea, because of their proximity to the island's active volcano, La Grande Soufrière. The volcano exploded on August 30, but there were no casualties except for two scientists who received minor injuries.
- The Shah of Iran, Mohammad Reza Pahlavi, granted amnesty to 307 prisoners who had been convicted in courts-martial of civilians and military personnel. The occasion was the celebration of the fiftieth year of the Pahlavi dynasty founded by the Shah's father, Reza Shah, on December 15, 1925.
- Mexico's Campeón de Campeones (Champion of Champions) game was played between Club América of Mexico City (the Mexican League champions) and the Copa México winners, Tigres UANL of Monterrey. Club América, nicknamed Las Aguilas, defeated Los Tigres, 2 to 0.
- Born:
  - Abiy Ahmed Ali, Prime Minister of Ethiopia since 2018; in Beshasha
  - Boudewijn Zenden, Dutch soccer football midfielder, Netherlands national team member and player in the leagues of four European nations; in Maastricht
- Died:
  - F. G. Miles, 73, British inventor and aircraft designer
  - U.S. Army Major General Harry C. Ingles, 88, commander of the United States Army Signal Corps during World War II, later President of RCA Global Communications.

== August 16, 1976 (Monday) ==
- Leaders from 85 "Third World" nations, officially "non-aligned" nations that were allied with neither Communist nations nor the world's major capitalist nations, opened in Sri Lanka at the capital, Colombo.
- Switzerland's government announced the arrest of the former commander of the Swiss Air Force, Brigadier General Jean-Louis Jeanmaire, on charges of having supplied top secret military information and documents to the Soviet Union.
- New Zealand's Private Schools Conditional Integration Act took effect, in the first program to allow private schools to come under the regulation and tax support of the government. The schools, most of them Roman Catholic, became tuition-free while still retaining their "special character", subject to providing equal rights and opportunities for students.
- The Convention on Psychotropic Substances, signed in Vienna on February 21, 1971, entered into effect,
- American golfer Dave Stockton won the PGA Championship tournament at the Congressional Country Club in Bethesda, Maryland. Stockton sank a 15 foot (4.6 m) putt on the 18th hole for a final score of 281 on 72 holes of golf, finishing one stroke ahead of Don January and Ray Floyd, who both had a score of 282, and avoiding a three-way overtime playoff.
- The first National Football League game ever played outside of North America took place in Tokyo, at a preseason exhibition that the St. Louis Cardinals won, 20 to 10, over the San Diego Chargers, before a crowd of 38,000 fans.

== August 17, 1976 (Tuesday) ==
- A tsunami killed more than 5,000 people in the Philippines on the islands of Mindanao and Sulu shortly after an earthquake that struck offshore at 11 minutes after midnight local time (16:11 UTC on August 16). Waves as high as 29 feet (8.8 m) were reported to have swept over Lebak on Mindanao. According to the Philippines' National Disaster Coordinating Center the next day, 3,131 people were confirmed dead and 3,117 were missing.
- Meeting at the Conference of Non-Aligned Nations (commonly called "The Third World Conference" by the western press), held in Colombo, Sri Lanka, Vietnam's Communist Prime Minister Pham Van Dong told fellow Third World leaders that Vietnam wanted to develop normal diplomatic relations with the U.S., with whom it had fought the Vietnam War, and to develop economic ties with the U.S. and other capitalist nations.
- Died:
  - William Redfield, 49, U.S. stage and film actor, from leukemia
  - Maurice Dobb, 76, British Marxist economist

== August 18, 1976 (Wednesday) ==
- At Panmunjom, North Korea, two United States soldiers were killed while trying to trim the branches on a tree which had obscured their view of their northernmost observation post in the Korean Demilitarized Zone. The trimming operation took place on the South Korean side of the "Bridge of No Return" near Panmunjom, as a group of six American and four South Korean border guards under the United Nations Command, along with five South Korean civilians were performing a routine task when they were approached by 11 North Korean soldiers. Under the terms of the truce creating the Korean DMZ, soldiers on both sides of the border were "guaranteed free movement and access inside the small, jointly administered zone designated as the Joint Security Area," informally referred to as the "Peace Village". At first the Communists approved of the project and even offered suggestions on pruning the trees. A few minutes later, two North Korean officers and some soldiers approached and demanded that the tree trimmings stop. The work continued and a truck with 20 more North Korean soldiers arrived and an officer gave the order "Kill them." At 10:45 in the morning local time, the North Koreans "rushed the Americans and South Koreans with axes, metal spikes and ax handles." The two dead were U.S. Army Captain Arthur G. Bonifas, 33, and First Lieutenant Mark T. Barrett, 25. In the 23 years since the end of the Korean War up until then, more than 1,000 people, including 49 Americans, had been killed in confrontations within the DMZ. According to the U.S. Department of Defense, the DEFCON level of state of readiness of defense condition was temporarily raised from DEFCON 4 to DEFCON 3 for the first time since the 1973 Arab-Israeli War.
- The South African governmental unit administering South West Africa as United Nations mandate announced that "a multiracial government" would be installed to lead the territory to full independence from the Union of South Africa by December 31, 1978. South Africa's apartheid white minority government, which had refused to give up its mandate during British rule, before the apartheid racial segregation policy had been implemented. The United Nations Council for Namibia rejected the plan as "ambiguous and equivocal." Namibia would attain independence as a majority-ruled black African nation in 1990.
- The Soviet Union's uncrewed spacecraft Luna 24 landed on the Moon, touching down in the Sea of Crises almost two years after Luna 23 had crashed into the same area in November 1974. During its stay of slightly less than 23 hours, Luna 24 drilled into the lunar surface two meters deep and picked up a soil sample and was launched back to lunar orbit to prepare for return to Earth.
- Three Mexican campesinos, who had crossed into the United States illegally, were caught and tortured by rancher George Hanigan and his two sons after being caught trespassing on Hanigan's ranch near the border town of Douglas, Arizona as they walked to a farm job in Elfrida. The Mexican men escaped the Hanigan Ranch and fled back across the border from Douglas to Agua Prieta, where they notified local police. The police contacted the Mexican consul in Douglas, who in turn appeared before a federal grand jury which indicted the Hanigans. George Hanigan would die of a heart attack on March 22, one week before the scheduled federal criminal trial. One of the sons, Patrick Hanigan, would be convicted of violating the civil rights of Manuel García Loya, Eleazar Ruelas Zavala, and Bernabe Herrera.
- Born:
  - Lee Seung-yuop, South Korean baseball star with 467 career home runs in the KBO League, and five-time Most Valuable Player of the league between in the years 1997 to 2003; in Daegu
  - U.S. Army Captain Kimberly Hampton, the first female pilot to be killed in combat; in Easley, South Carolina. Captain Hampton was flying a Bell OH-58 Kiowa helicopter in the Iraq War when the aircraft was shot down as she was flying near Fallujah. (d. 2004)
- Died: Reverend Roman Kotlarz, 47, Polish Roman Catholic priest in the city of Radom, an opponent of Poland's Communist government, died after being beaten into unconsciousness by agents of Poland's secret police, the Sluzba Bezpieczenstwa (SB)

== August 19, 1976 (Thursday) ==
- U.S. President Gerald Ford edged out challenger Ronald Reagan, 1,187 to 1,070 in delegate votes, on the first ballot to win the Republican Party presidential nomination at the Republican National Convention at Kemper Arena in Kansas City. Ford, the only U.S. president who had never been elected as either the presidential or vice-presidential nominee, had succeeded to the office after initially being confirmed by the U.S. Senate as Vice President of the United States in 1973 to fill the vacancy left by the resignation of Spiro Agnew, and then being sworn in after the resignation of President Richard Nixon. The balloting was close enough between Ford and Reagan that in an alphabetical roll-call of the U.S. states' delegations, he didn't receive the necessary 1,131 majority until receiving the 20 votes from the West Virginia delegates at 12:29 in the morning local time. Ford then drove to Reagan's hotel and met with the former California governor for 27 minutes.
- Later in the day, President Ford selected Bob Dole, Republican U.S. Senator for Kansas, as his running mate to be the Republican nominee for Vice President of the United States. In addition, for the first time since 1960, the nominees of the two parties agreed to nationally-televised presidential debates as Ford made the challenge and Democratic nominee Jimmy Carter accepted.
- Born: Ucu Agustin, Indonesian journalist and documentary filmmaker; in Sukabumi

== August 20, 1976 (Friday) ==
- Federal police in the Argentine town of Fátima, located on the outskirts of Buenos Aires, executed 30 prisoners (10 women and 20 men) by gunshot, and then used dynamite to blow up the pile of corpses. According to witnesses at a nearby factory who heard the explosion and went to the scene, body parts were scattered over a wide area. Argentine troops then sealed off the area and the body parts were buried in a nearby cemetery at Pilar, with only five people originally identified. Another 16 people were killed by machine guns and their bodies dumped in a field near a major highway outside of the southern suburb of Banfield.
- For the first time in U.S. history, the two major party candidates for Vice President of the U.S. agreed to debate the national issues, as well as to have the event on live television. Jimmy Carter's running mate Walter Mondale, and Gerald Ford's running mate Bob Dole would each be losing candidates in a U.S. presidential election (in 1980, 1984, 1976 and 1996 respectively).
- At an event held at New York's West Side Tennis Club, Australian tennis professional Colin Dibley recorded the fastest tennis serve up to that time, slamming the ball at a speed of 130 miles per hour (210 km/h) as measured by a radar gun. The Association of Tennis Professionals official record is 157.2 miles per hour (253.0 km/h) set by John Isner of the U.S. at a Davis Cup match in 2016, while Australia's Sam Groth's serve was measured at 163.4 miles per hour (263.0 km/h) at a tournament in Busan, South Korea, in 2012.
- Died:
  - Edward Cummiskey, 42, U.S. meat cutter and a mobster and for New York's Irish-American Westies gang who specialized in dismemberment and disposal of bodies, was shot and killed on orders of the Genovese family.
  - Vladimir Druzhynin, 68, Soviet Ukrainian war hero and Communist Party local leader
  - Tom Fool, 27, American thoroughbred and 1953 American Horse of the Year

== August 21, 1976 (Saturday) ==
- Three days after the killing of a pair of U.S. Army officers in the Korean DMZ by North Koreans, the United States carried out "Operation Paul Bunyan", a show of force to remind North Korea of the U.S. determination to protect South Korea, accompanied by the dispatch of F-4, F-111 and B-52 fighters and bombers, as well as helicopter gunships and 300 soldiers. A group of 110 U.S. servicemen went to the Panmunjom site and completed the job of cutting down the 40 foot (12 m) tall poplar tree that had been the cause of the international incident.
- The town of Mont-de-Marsan, located in southern France, held what it would claim to be the first punk rock festival. Organized by promoter Marc Zermati, Le Festival Punk de Mont-de-Marsan featured British bands Eddie and the Hot Rods and The Damned, and the French bands Bijou, Il Biaritz and Shakin' Street.
- A 10-year-old Massachusetts boy, Angelo "Andy" Puglisi, went missing from a public pool near his home in Lawrence, Massachusetts. Angelo had last been seen leaving the Den Rock Park at 2:00 in the afternoon after swimming with friends. More than 30 years later, the case would become the subject of Have You Seen Andy?, a 2007 HBO documentary by one of Andy's friends, Melanie Perkins McLaughlin, who had been with him at the pool on the day of his disappearance.
- Died: Juliana Mickwitz, 87, Finnish-born American cryptanalyst and translator, official with the National Security Agency from 1952 to 1963.

== August 22, 1976 (Sunday) ==
- The Soviet Union's Luna 24 spacecraft returned to Earth with the first sample of soil from the Mare Crisium, one of five areas on the Moon that has extremely dense rock. The existence of these dense areas had been found by the U.S. probe Lunar Orbiter 5 in January 1968. The 170.1 grams (6.00 oz) of lunar soil would as the last to be brought to Earth from the Moon for more than 40 years until December 16, 2020, the date of Earth landing of the Chinese sample return mission probe Chang'e 5 with 1.731 kilograms (3.82 lb) of lunar soil.
- Died:
  - Juscelino Kubitschek, 73, President of Brazil from 1956 to 1961
  - Oskar Brüsewitz, 47, East German Lutheran pastor who set himself on fire four days earlier to protest the Communist nation's repression of religion, died from severe burns.

== August 23, 1976 (Monday) ==
- All 98 hostages (92 passengers and six crew) on EgyptAir Flight 321 were rescued, unharmed, by Egypt's commando team, the El-Sa‘ka Forces after three hijackers had taken over the Boeing 737 as it was flying from Cairo to Luxor. The armed group from the Abd al-Nasir organization, whose members later told police that they had been paid $50,000 of a $250,000 fee for the hijacking, demanded the release of five Libyan nationals imprisoned in Egypt, and for the aircraft to be flown to Libya. After the pilot convinced the hijackers that the plane had only had enough fuel to reach its destination, Flight 321 landed in Luxor and needed maintenance. Two commandos, posing as airport workers, made several trips in and out of the EgyptAir plane to give the appearance of checking on mechanical problems, and then gave the signal for the rest of the rescue team (commanded by Egyptian Army Colonel Sayed El Sharkawy) stormed the plane and took everyone alive, including the three terrorists.
- A spokesman for the Jet Propulsion Laboratory (JPL) announced that the Viking 1 lander had found no signs of life on the planet Mars, based on its test of looking for organic material by heating soil samples to temperatures of 500 °C (932 °F) and then attempting to detect carbon by tandem mass spectrometry. Dr. Klaus Biemann told a press conference, "We can say if there was as much as 12 parts per billion we would see it. Organically speaking, it's a very clean material."
- Fighting between black South African groups began in Johannesburg after two-thirds of the population of the city's black neighborhoods in Soweto refused to return to work, while another one-third ignored the strike. As many as 1,500 Zulu workers in the suburb of Orlando West went from house to house after several Zulu residents of a hostel in Mzimhlope had been taunted and had rocks thrown. After returning from work, the Zulu laborers returned home, gathered weapons, and took revenge on the demonstrators, killing at least four. The demonstrators then burned down the Zulu hostel, and, with apparent approval by the white South African government and its Johannesburg police force, the Zulus created a vigilante mob to protect other black South African employees who had returned from work, while violently attacking demonstrators.
- The southern African nation of Botswana introduced a new currency the pula, to replace the South African rand, which had been used as the legal currency since the republic's independence from the United Kingdom in 1966. Each pula, which had par value with the rand, was worth 100 thebes.
- Born:
  - Scott Caan, American TV actor known as the co-star of the second Hawaii Five-0 series; in Los Angeles
  - Dai Koyamada, Japanese freestyle boulderer and rock climber; in Kagoshima

== August 24, 1976 (Tuesday) ==
- The Soviet Union's Soyuz 21 space mission ended early as cosmonauts Boris Volynov and Vitaly Zholobov returned to Earth 50 days after their launch on July 6.
- Born:
  - Yang Yang, Chinese speed skater with seven consecutive world championships in the women's events between 1997 and 2003 (including 6 in a row in the 1000m race) 2002 Olympic gold medalist in the 500m and 1000m races; in Jiamusi, Heilongjiang
  - Alex O’Loughlin, Australian TV actor known as the star of the second Hawaii Five-0 series; in Canberra

== August 25, 1976 (Wednesday) ==
- Jacques Chirac resigned as Prime Minister of France in anger over the lack of authority given to him by President Valery Giscard d'Estaing. Chirac was replaced by Foreign Trade Minister Raymond Barre. "I am quitting because I don't have the means I consider necessary for the effective performance of my functions as Prime Minister," Chirac said, "and in these conditions I've decided to end them."
- The International Track Association (ITA), the first professional track and field athletics association, announced that it was suspending operations after having had only six track meets in its 1976 season. Michael F. O'Hara, the ITA president, made the announcement as the sixth ITA meet of the season concluded at Mount Hood Community College in the Portland suburb of Gresham, Oregon, attracted a crowd of only 1,000 paying customers, and told reporters "We're not closing down, but merely curtailing our season." Scheduled ITA events at Minneapolis, Cleveland and Boston were canceled. The ITA had been created in 1972 to pay track athletes who had been forbidden by amateur rules from accepting compensation. In the final meet, "Nineteen athletes competed and only six of nine scheduled events took place." Winners of the final ITA competition were Rod Milburn in the 120-yard hurdles over Lance Babb; Ed Lipscomb in the pole vault over Steve Smith; John Radetich in the high jump; Warren Edmonson over John Smith and Larry James in the 300-meter race; Ken Swenson in the 880-meter race over Tommie Fulton and John Kipkurgat; and Brian Oldfield as the only competitor in the shot put. In the final event, "A print medley team comprised of Edmonson, Smith, J.J. Johnson and Kipkurgat, running against no one, finished with a time of 3:19.6." Ironically, the concept of a professional track and field league failed because amateur athletes received more money by being paid covertly and not being caught. O'Hara explained "We did not anticipate the amateur athlete making the dollar he now is making."
- Born: Alexander Skarsgård, Swedish TV and film actor, Emmy Award winner; in Stockholm
- Died: Eyvind Johnson, 76, Swedish novelist and co-winner of the 1974 Nobel Prize in Literature

== August 26, 1976 (Thursday) ==
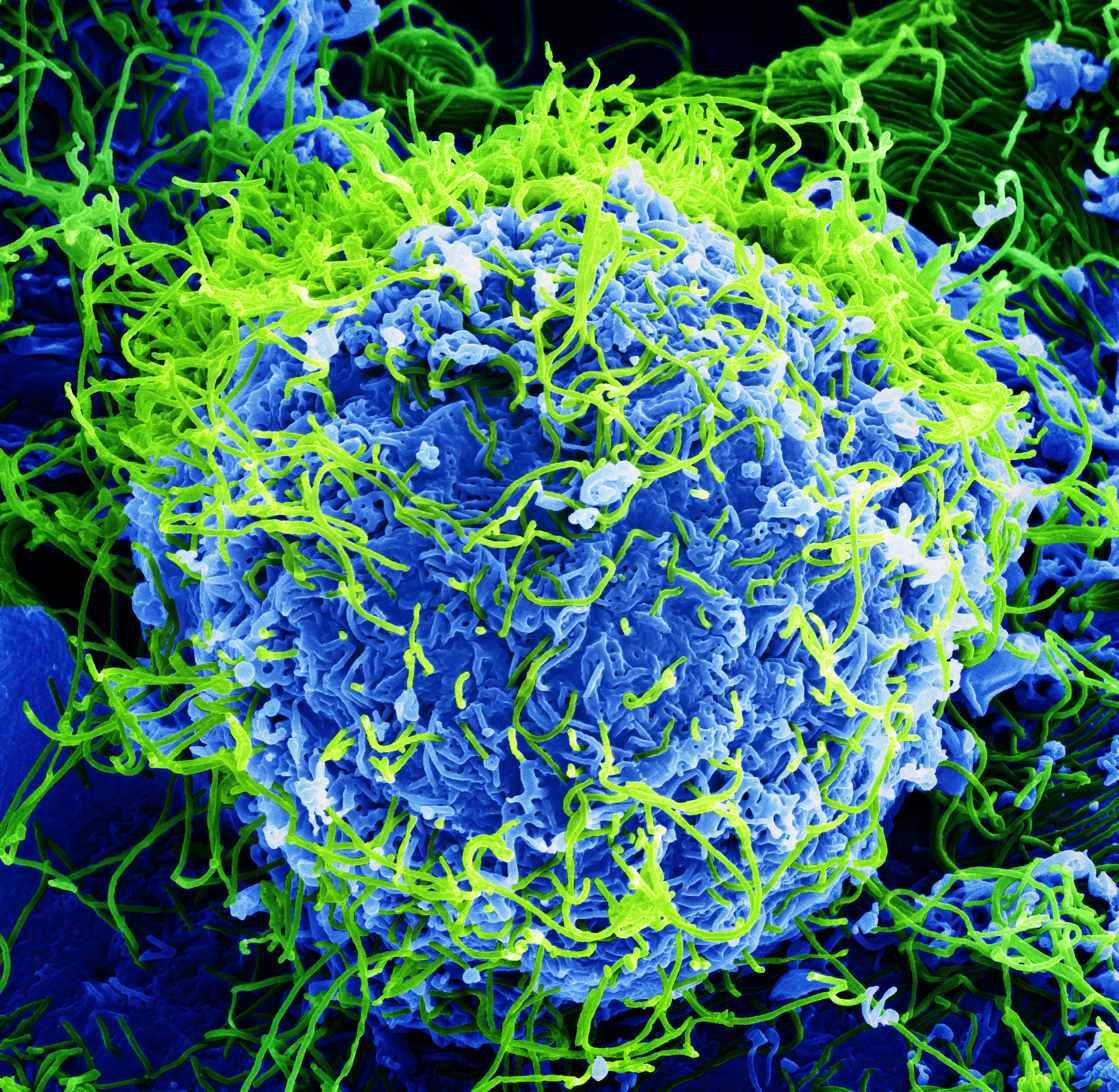
colorized 20000x magnification of Ebola

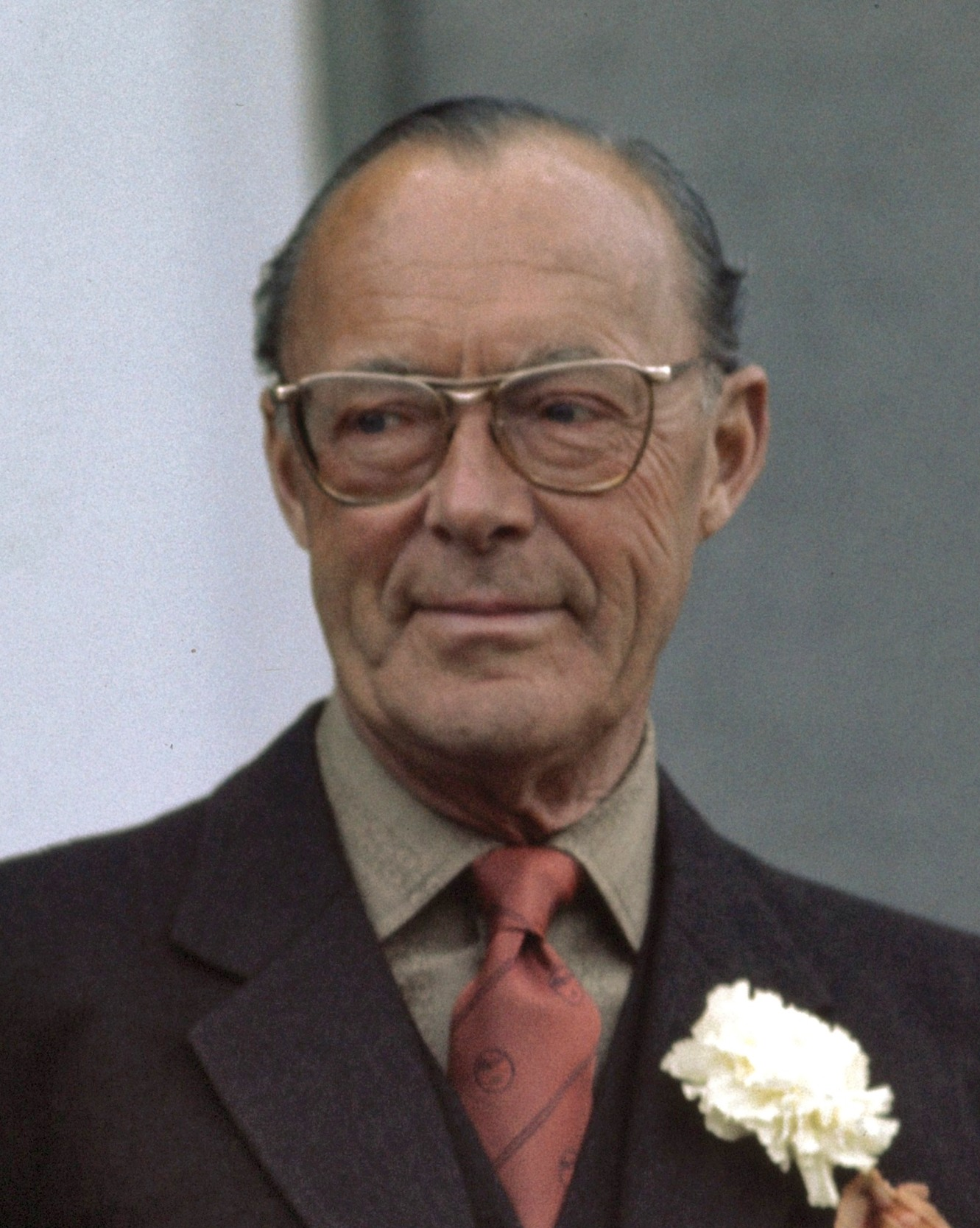
Prince Bernhard

- The first known outbreak of Zaire ebolavirus occurred in the village of Yambuku in northern Zaire (now the Democratic Republic of the Congo, when Mabalo Lokela, a 44-year-old teacher at the Yambuku Mission School, first sought treatment at a clinic. His condition worsened, and Lokela was admitted to the Yambuku hospital on September 5, dying on September 8. Within a week, nine other village residents had died after developing similar symptoms. From August 10 to 22, Mr. Lokela and six co-workers had been on vacation, traveling to villages and towns and he had experienced symptoms of what he thought was malaria.
- Prince Bernhard of Lippe-Biesterfeld, Prince Consort of the Netherlands husband of Queen Juliana, resigned from almost all various posts over a scandal involving alleged corruption, in connection with business dealings with the Lockheed Corporation. Prime Minister Joop den Uyl told a session of Parliament that a board of inquiry said that there was no firm evidence to confirm allegations the Prince Bernhard had accepted $1.1 million in bribes, but noted that he had "allowed himself to be tempted to take initiatives which were completely unacceptable."
- Died:
  - Lotte Lehmann, 88, German operatic soprano
  - Geraldo Assoviador (nickname for Geraldo Cleofas Dias), 22, Brazilian national team soccer football midfielder, died from cardiac arrest from an anaphylactic reaction to a local anesthetic during an outpatient tonsillectomy
  - Domenico Tripodo, 53, Italian mob boss and jailed leader of the 'Ndrangheta syndicate, was stabbed to death by a fellow inmate at the Poggioreale prison in Naples on orders from his rival, Paolo De Stefano.

== August 27, 1976 (Friday) ==
- The first internetworking using the Transmission Control Protocol (TCP/IP), between two separate computer networks, was carried out by Don Cone of the Stanford Research Institute (SRI) to open wireless two-way connection between SRI's network and the ARPANET established by the Advanced Research Projects Agency of the United States Department of Defense. Cone transmitted from a mobile unit, the specially-equipped Packet Radio Van, which he drove from SRI in Menlo Park, California to a location in Portola Valley, about 5.6 miles (9.0 km) away. A three-network internetworking link, the first true internet transmission, would take place from Cone's van on November 22, 1977.
- Mathematician Willem Klein of the Netherlands calculated the 73rd root of a 500-digit number in 2 minutes and 43 seconds. This feat was recorded by the Guinness Book of Records.
- The New York Sets defeated the Golden Gaters of San Francisco, 31 to 13, to win the World Team Tennis (WTT) championship.
- Born:
  - Carlos Moyá, Spanish professional tennis player briefly ranked number one in the world (by the ATP in 1999), 1998 French Open winner; in Palma de Mallorca
  - Sanjeev Das, Indian cancer research scientist, at Nasirabad, Rajasthan
  - Sarah Chalke, Canadian-born TV actress known for Roseanne, Scrubs, and The Conners; in Ottawa
  - Gautam Malkani, British financial journalist and author of the novel Londonstani; in Hounslow, London
- Died: Wanda Montlak Szmielew, 58, Polish mathematical logician; from cancer

== August 28, 1976 (Saturday) ==
- The news of the first man-made gene was announced by the Massachusetts Institute of Technology (MIT), which confirmed that a team of scientists led by Dr. Har Gobind Khorana would make a full report of their work at the August 30 annual meeting of the American Chemical Society in San Francisco.
- Two C-141 Starlifter transports of the U.S. Air Force's 438th Military Airlift Wing crashed in separate accidents on the same day. After crashing on landing in a flight from Thule, 21 members of a group of 27 American and Danish passengers died at Sondrestrom Air Base in Greenland. In the other crash, all 18 people flying from McGuire Air Force Base in New Jersey to the RAF Mildenhall in England died when the aircraft was struck by lightning at an altitude of 2,000 feet (610 m) as it approached Mildenhall and crashed near Peterborough in Cambridgeshire.
- The government of South Korea issued prison sentences against 18 prominent dissidents, ranging from two to eight years incarceration, for their criticism of the government of President Park Chung-hee. Eight-year sentences were given to 79-year-old former President Yun Po-sun and to former presidential candidate Kim Dae-jung (who would later serve as President from 1998 to 2003).
- Archaeologists in the U.S. state of South Carolina raised an 18th Century merchant ship from the Black River near Oakland after starting salvage of its artifacts on July 13. The ship was estimated to have been built between 1720 and 1760. At the time, the oldest known ship to be recovered in the U.S. was the colonial gunboat Philadelphia, believed to have been built no earlier than 1770.
- The U.S. Navy frigate USS Voge was heavily damaged by a Soviet Navy Echo II-class nuclear submarine K-22 while both were in the Mediterranean Sea near Greece. Repairs to USS Voge cost more than $500,000 and a U.S. Navy sailor sustained minor injuries.
- Toronto Metros-Croatia defeated the Minnesota Kicks, 3 to 0, to win Soccer Bowl '76, the championship of the North American Soccer League, before a crowd of 25,765 people at the Kingdome, in Seattle.
- Born:
  - Nediyavan (nom de guerre of Perinpanayagam Sivaparan), Sri Lankan rebel and leader of the Liberation Tigers of Tamil Eelam militant secessionist group; in Vaddukoddai
  - Angus Oblong (pen name for David Adam Walker), American children's book author and illustrator who later created the animated TV series The Oblongs; in Sacramento, California
- Died:
  - Anissa Jones, 18, American child actress known for her role as Buffy Davis in the TV series Family Affair, was found dead of an accidental drug overdose in Oceanside, California
  - Patricia Lam (stage name for Fung Suk Yin), 37, Hong Kong film actress, committed suicide

== August 29, 1976 (Sunday) ==
- Fourteen employees of a factory in Bangkok, all but two of them teenage girls, were killed in a fiery chemical explosion. The blast at a hair curler factory also killed the wife of the owner and another woman.
- The first Women in Print Conference was held in Omaha, Nebraska. Over 130 women from 80 feminist organizations and collectives attended the gathering, which was associated with the women in print movement.
- Died:
  - Jimmy Reed, 50, African-American blues musician and Rock and Roll Hall of Fame inductee, died of respiratory failure.
  - Kazi Nazrul Islam, 77, Bengali musician and poet

== August 30, 1976 (Monday) ==
- Harold McCluskey, a 65-year-old chemical operations technician at the Hanford Plutonium Finishing Plant in the U.S. state of Washington, survived an accident in which he received the highest dose of radiation from radioactive americium ever recorded. He became known as the 'Atomic Man'. McCluskey was exposed to at least 37 million becquerel (Bq) of americium-241 radioactivity, 500 times the occupational standard for the plutonium byproduct, in an explosion at the Hanford plant. Despite having americium-241 in his bone marrow, bones and soft tissue (reduced by his decontamination treatment), McCluskey never developed cancer and would live until dying in 1987 of coronary artery disease.)
- India's Prime Minister Indira Gandhi introduced a 20-page bill to rewrite the Indian Constitution to strengthen her emergency powers.
- James Alexander George Smith McCartney was sworn in as the first Chief Minister of the Turks and Caicos Islands.
- Members of the Tweede Kamer, the lower house of the Netherlands' parliament (the Staten-Generaal), overwhelmingly rejected a motion to criminally prosecute Prince Bernhard, the husband of Queen Juliana, for suspected receipt of bribes. Only 2 members, both from the Pacifist Socialist Party, voted in favor of the motion after making it and seconding it, while the other 148 present voted against.
- The Lebanese Forces a Christian militia that played a major role during the Lebanese Civil War was founded by future Lebanese president elect Bachir Gemayel.
- Born:
  - Cristian Gonzáles, Uruguayan soccer football striker who became a star for the Indonesian national team at the age of 27; in Montevideo
  - Lillo Brancato, Colombian-born American film actor who was later convicted of first-degree burglary in Bogotá

== August 31, 1976 (Tuesday) ==
- The value of the Mexican peso was devalued as the government of Mexico announced that it would abandon its policy since 1954 of an exchange rate of 12.50 pesos per one United States dollar. The change was announced by Finance Minister Mario Ramón Beteta.
- The popular situation comedy Alice premiered on CBS for the first of nine seasons. Based on the 1974 film Alice Doesn't Live Here Anymore, the TV version starred actress and singer Linda Lavin in the title role as a widow and single mother who makes a new start as a waitress and "Mel's Diner", a roadside diner in Phoenix, Arizona.
- Born:
  - Guinness Pakru (stage name for Ajay Kumar), diminutive (at 2 ft 6 in (76 cm)) Indian comedian, known for being the smallest film actor in history and as star of the Malayalam language film Athbhutha Dweepu; in Kollam, Kerala state
  - Roque Junior (José Vítor Roque Jr.), Brazilian soccer football defender and national team member; in Santa Rita do Sapucaí, Minas Gerais
  - William McDowell, American gospel music and contemporary Christian music singer and songwriter; in Cincinnati
- Died: Buell Kazee, 76, American folk music and Country music singer
