= July 1976 =

Month in 1976

<<	July 1976					>>
Su	Mo	Tu	We	Th	Fr	Sa
				1	2	3
4	5	6	7	8	9	10
11	12	13	14	15	16	17
18	19	20	21	22	23	24
25	26	27	28	29	30	31

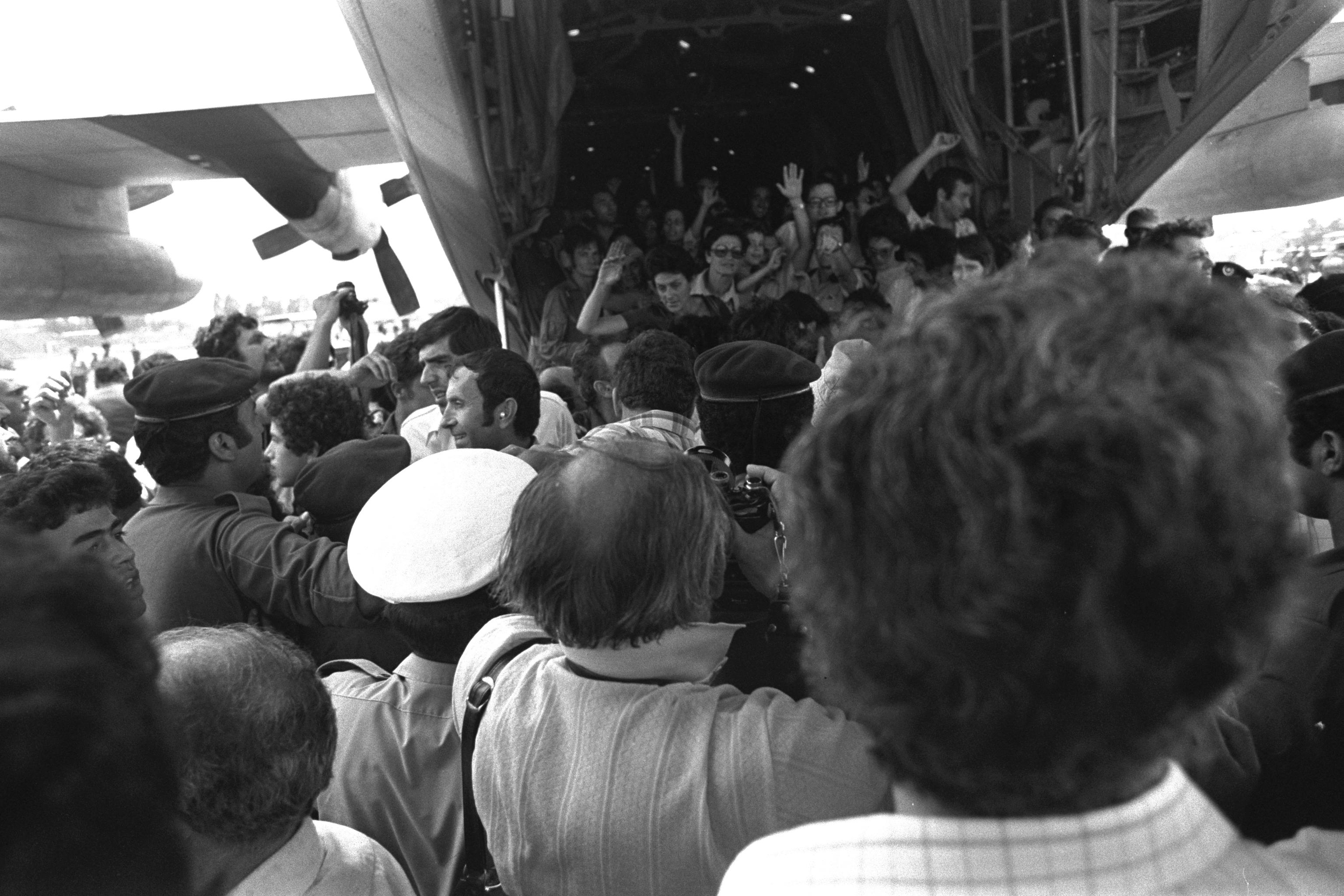
July 4, 1976: Israeli commandos storm Uganda's Entebbe Airport, rescue 103 hostages, and fly them back to Israel

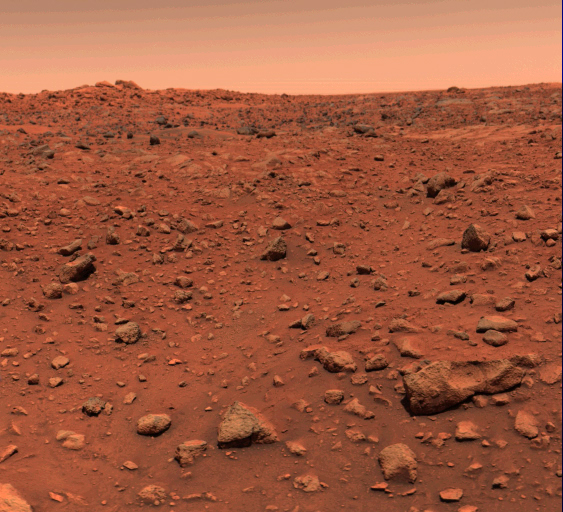
July 21, 1976: First color photos of Mars are transmitted to Earth

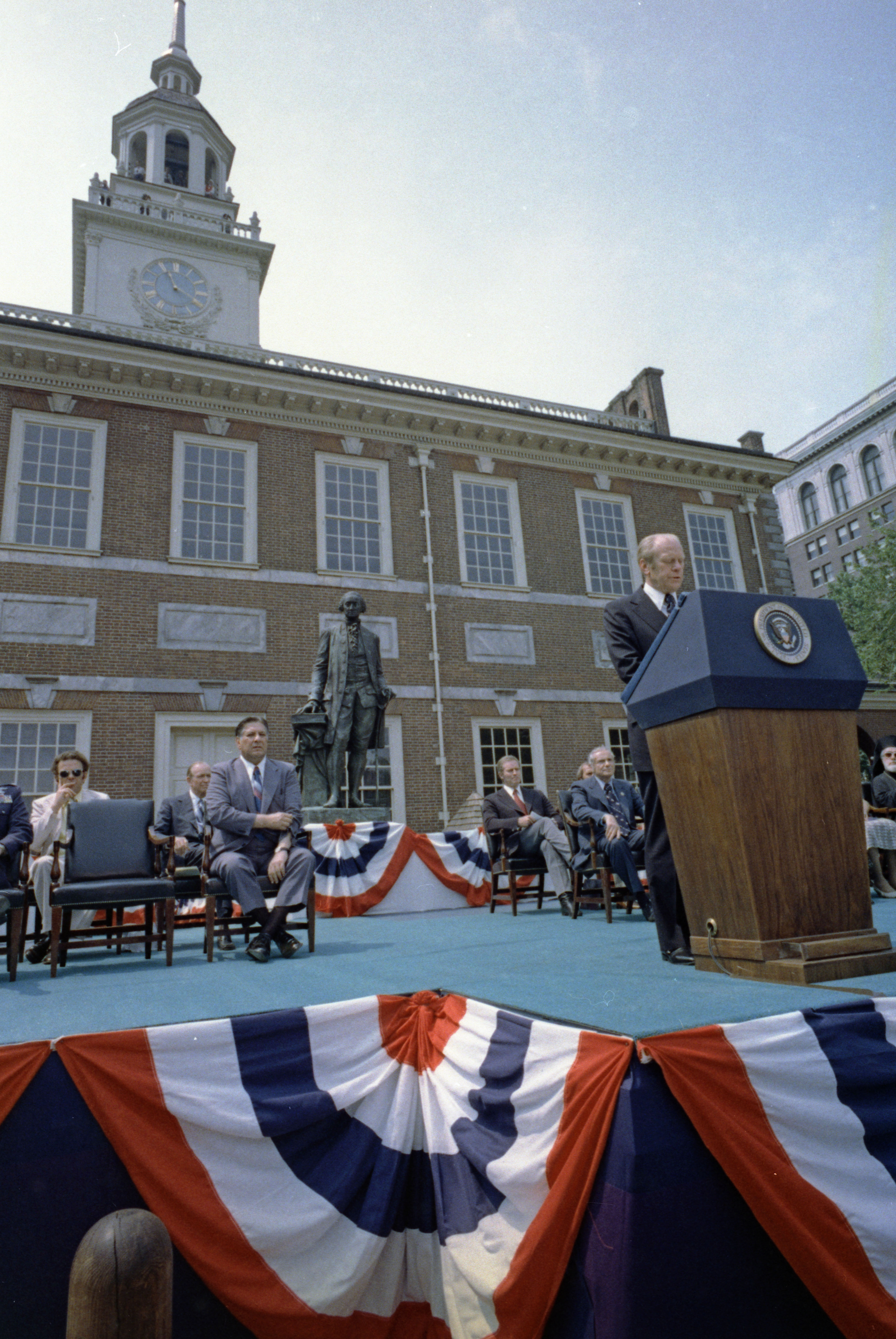
July 4, 1976: U.S. celebrates bicentennial of adoption of Declaration of Independence

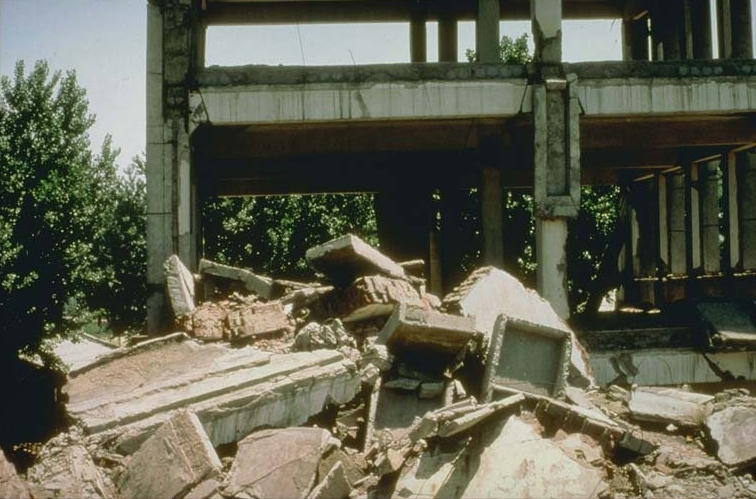
July 28, 1976: Tangshan Earthquake kills more than 650,000 people in China

== July 1, 1976 (Thursday) ==
- Carlos Arias Navarro, who had been Prime Minister of Spain since his appointment by Francisco Franco in 1974, resigned at the request of Franco's successor, King Juan Carlos I. Arias, who had blocked the King's attempts at reform, was given the concession of a title of nobility the next day.
- The day after freeing 47 hostages, the hijackers of Air France Flight 139 freed another 101 passengers from captivity and extended their deadline for release of 53 prisoners to 2:00 in the afternoon for Sunday, as Israel continued to negotiate for the safety of the remaining 110 people on board. After the June 27 hijacking, the group from the Popular Front for the Liberation of Palestine had set a July 1 ultimatum for their demands to be met or for the hostages to be killed. Israel's cabinet of ministers had voted to open negotiations with the terrorists, reversing a long-held policy after members of the hostages' families had forced their way into Prime Minister Yitzhak Rabin's office.
- Mrs. Dora Bloch, a 74-year old retiree and one of the hostages held at the Entebbe Airport in Uganda after the hijacking of Air France 139, became choked while eating lunch and was taken to a hospital in Kampala for treatment. She had dual Israeli and British citizenship after having married a Briton, and had been on her way to New York City to attend her son's wedding when the airplane was hijacked by terrorists, and was not at the airport when the Israeli rescue of hostages took place. After the other hostages were flown back to Israel in a rescue mission, Mrs. Bloch was taken from her hospital bed on July 4 by Ugandan soldiers and murdered.
- Tina Turner escaped her abusive husband and singing partner Ike Turner after he had beaten her on their way to the Statler Hilton Hotel in Dallas, where they were scheduled to perform as a duo. Tina Turner would go on to launch a successful solo career, with more success than she had had as half of the duo of Ike and Tina Turner.
- Born:
  - Patrick Kluivert, Dutch national soccer football team striker; in Amsterdam
  - Ruud van Nistelrooy, Dutch national soccer football team striker; in Oss
  - Justin Lo, American-born Hong Kong singer; in Syracuse, New York
  - Haaz Sleiman, Lebanese-born American actor; in Beirut
  - Kellie Bright, English soap opera actress known for EastEnders; in Brentwood, Essex
- Died:
  - Zhang Wentian, 75, former General Secretary of the Chinese Communist Party from 1935 to 1943, later persecuted during the Cultural Revolution
  - Anneliese Michel, 23, West German woman who died from malnutrition after her parents asked two Roman Catholic priests to treat her for psychosis by exorcism

== July 2, 1976 (Friday) ==
- The Provisional Revolutionary Government of the Republic of South Vietnam, which had been installed after the fall of Saigon to the Viet Cong and to the North Vietnamese Army, was dissolved and the former Republic of South Vietnam was reunited with the Democratic Republic of Vietnam (North Vietnam) to form the Socialist Republic of Vietnam. Huynh Tan Phat, who had been the head of government of South Vietnam's Communist state, became the first vice president of the new SRV, with North Vietnam's president Ton Duc Thang as the SRV president.
- A bomb placed by the Monteneros terrorist group killed 24 members of the Policía Federal Argentina in the Balvanera neighborhood of Buenos Aires, and injured 70 others. On orders of Horacio Verbitsky and Rodolfo Walsh, José María Salgado, a former PFA officer who had joined the Montoneros operative used his badge to gain entry into the dining hall of the Superintendencia de Seguridad Federal. Salgado placed a time bomb, loaded with 19 pounds (8.6 kg) of explosives and shrapnel and wrapped in an overcoat, beneath a chair. The bomb exploded at 1:20 in the afternoon as PFA cadets were eating lunch.
- More than 800 people were killed during an unsuccessful attempt by rebellious officers in the north African nation of Sudan to overthrow the government of President Jaafar Nimeiry. At 5:00 in the morning, Nimeiry had arrived at the Khartoum airport after concluding official visits to the United States and France, and was driven back to the presidential palace. A force of 17 rebels drove up to the airport at 5:10, firing their way into the terminal with plans to kill Nimeiry as he was disembarking from his flight. Troops from the nearby military camp in Shagara attempted to capture him, even surrounding the presidential palace with tanks, before other troops loyal to Nimeiry suppressed the rebellion. Investigators concluded that Nimeiry's life had been saved because his airplane had arrived 15 minutes ahead of schedule due to tail winds on his flight back to Khartoum, and he had already landed and exited his plane; "He was in a building 100 yards from the main terminal when the shooting began and was whisked away in an unmarked car." Death sentences were carried out on August 4 and 5 against 98 conspirators who were shot by a firing squad including the coup leader, Brigadier General Mohammed Nur Saeed of Sudan's Army, who had led the effort involving more than 1,000 troops who had been trained in camps in Libya.
- The Supreme Court of the United States ruled in Gregg v. Georgia, holding by a 7 to 2 majority that the death penalty was not inherently cruel or unusual and was a constitutionally acceptable form of punishment, partially overturning the Furman v. Georgia case of 1972.
- Chris Evert of the United States won the Wimbledon women's singles championship, defeating Evonne Goolagong of Australia in a third set that went into extra games, 6-3, 4-6, 8-6.
- Born: Krisztián Lisztes, Hungarian national soccer football team striker; in Budapest

== July 3, 1976 (Saturday) ==
- The heat wave in the United Kingdom, at the time in a state of drought conditions, reached its hottest day, with a temperature of 96.6 °F (35.9 °C) in Cheltenham, Gloucestershire.
- West German serial killer Joachim Kroll, who confessed to having killed 14 people since 1955 (including nine girls) was arrested at his apartment in the Huckingen section of Duisburg. Police had been conducting a house-to-house search for a missing child when they received a tip from a neighbor about Kroll's behavior and a blocked drainage pipe.
- Turkish Cypriot leader Rauf Denktaş was sworn in as the first president of the Turkish Federated State of Cyprus, a breakaway republic that had been proclaimed in 1975 in the northern portion of the island republic of Cyprus in the Mediterranean Sea after Turkey's invasion of Cyprus following the 1974 overthrow of the government by Greek Cypriots seeking union with Greece.
- In the second phase of Spain's transition to democracy after the end of the government of Francisco Franco, King Juan Carlos I selected Adolfo Suárez, who had been the deputy secretary-general of Movimiento Nacional, Spain's only legal political party, during the Franco regime. Because of Suárez's Francoist background, he was viewed by the King as being the most likely to persuade the more conservative legislators of the Cortes Españolas of the need for reform.
- Björn Borg of Sweden won the men's singles championship at Wimbledon, defeating Ilie Nastase of Romania in straight sets, 6-4, 6-2 and 9-7.
- Born:
  - Henry Olonga, Zambian-born Zimbabwean national cricket team bowler; in Lusaka
  - Bobby Skinstad, Zimbabwean-born South African national rugby union flanker; in Bulawayo, Rhodesia
  - Andrea Barber, American TV actress; in Los Angeles
- Died: Revol Samuilovich Bunin, 52, Soviet Russian classical music composer, from a bronchial asthma attack. Bunin, the author of nine symphonies and an opera, had been working on a second opera, The People's Will, at the time of his sudden death.

== July 4, 1976 (Sunday) ==
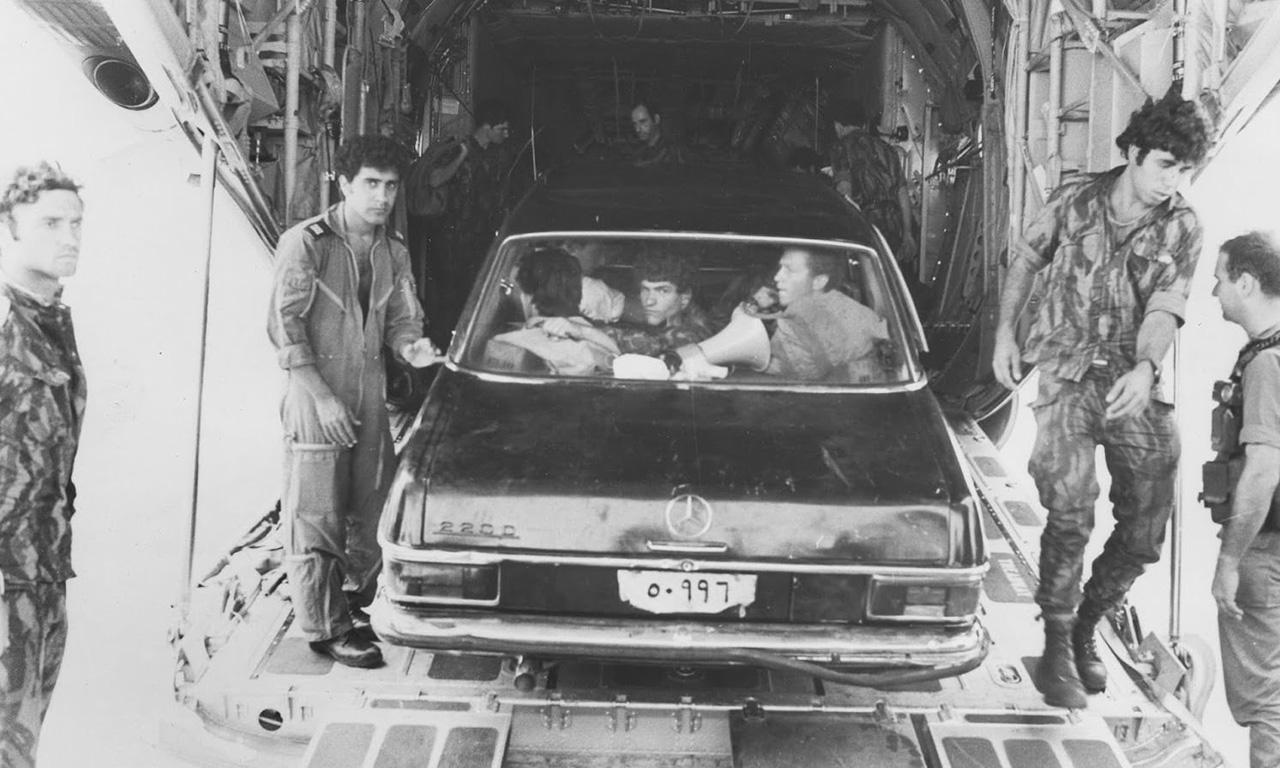
Operation Entebbe

- A rescue mission at the Entebbe Airport in Uganda ended successfully as airplanes landed safely in Israel with 102 of the remaining 106 hostages from Air France Flight 139, which had been hijacked a week earlier on June 27. A 29-man assault team from the Israel Defense Forces (IDF) Sayeret Matkal special forces unit, led by Lieutenant Colonel Yonatan Netanyahu, landed at Entebbe on Saturday night at 11:00 pm local time (2000 UTC July 3), flew out 53 minutes later and landed in Kenya at Nairobi. Along with three of the hostages at Entebbe, all seven of the hijackers, at least 33 Ugandan Army soldiers and Lt. Col. Netanyahu— whose younger brother Benjamin Netanyahu would become Prime Minister of Israel almost 20 years later— were killed in the raid. The raiding team arrived in three C-130 transport airplanes. Among the ruses used by the Israelis were to transport a Mercedes limousine and two Land-Rover jeeps by cargo plane to Entebbe, where an agent in a Ugandan Army uniform impersonated President Idi Amin and was accompanied by faux bodyguards.

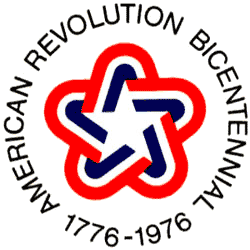
The U.S. Bicentennial Logo

- The U.S. celebrated its bicentennial, in recognition of the 200th anniversary of the July 4, 1776 adoption of the Declaration of Independence from Great Britain.
- Voters in Mexico participated in elections for President and for the Congress of the Union (consisting of the 64-member Senate and 237-member Chamber of Deputies). The Partido Revolucionario Institucional (PRI), which had maintained a monopoly on the government since 1929. José López Portillo, the former Finance Minister of Mexico, was elected without opposition as the 58th president and would be inaugurated on December 1.
- Agents hired by the Argentine Navy carried out the revenge murder of three Roman Catholic priests and two seminary students at the San Patricio church in the Belgrano neighborhood of Buenos Aires.
- Born:
  - Daijiro Kato, Japanese motorcycle road racer, 2001 Grand Prix world champion for 250cc racing; in Saitama (killed in race accident, 2003)
  - Rohan Nichol, Australian TV actor known for Home and Away; in Geraldton, Western Australia

== July 5, 1976 (Monday) ==
- Adolfo Suárez was sworn in as the new Prime Minister of Spain after his appointment by King Juan Carlos I to work toward political reform.
- The Italian Communist Party (PCI), with the second highest number of seats in Italy's Chamber of Deputies, received "its most import parliamentary post since the birth of the Italian Republic" as Pietro Ingrao was elected as president of the chamber with 488 of the 613 votes. With pressure from the United States and Western European nations to prevent Italy's Communists from participating as part of the ministers of the cabinet, and none of the parties having a majority of seats the Christian Democracy Party (DC), the PCI agreed to support the election of a Communist Party member as leader of the Deputies to be in return for the PCI's vote of confidence for the government of Prime Minister Giulio Andreotti.
- Ivanka Khristova of Bulgaria broke the world record for distance in the shot put, at 21.89 meters. The previous record had been 21.87m, which she had set on July 3 at the same track and field meet in the Bulgarian city of Belmeken. She held the record for less than three months when it was superseded by Helena Fibingerová.
- Born:
  - Jamie Elman, American-born Canadian actor known for American Dreams; in New York City
  - Nuno Gomes, Portuguese national soccer football team striker; in Amarante
- Died: Walter Giesler, 66, American soccer football goalkeeper for the U.S. national soccer team at the 1948 Olympics and at the 1950 World Cup, died suddenly while the 1950 team was being inducted collectively into the U.S. Soccer Hall of Fame.

== July 6, 1976 (Tuesday) ==
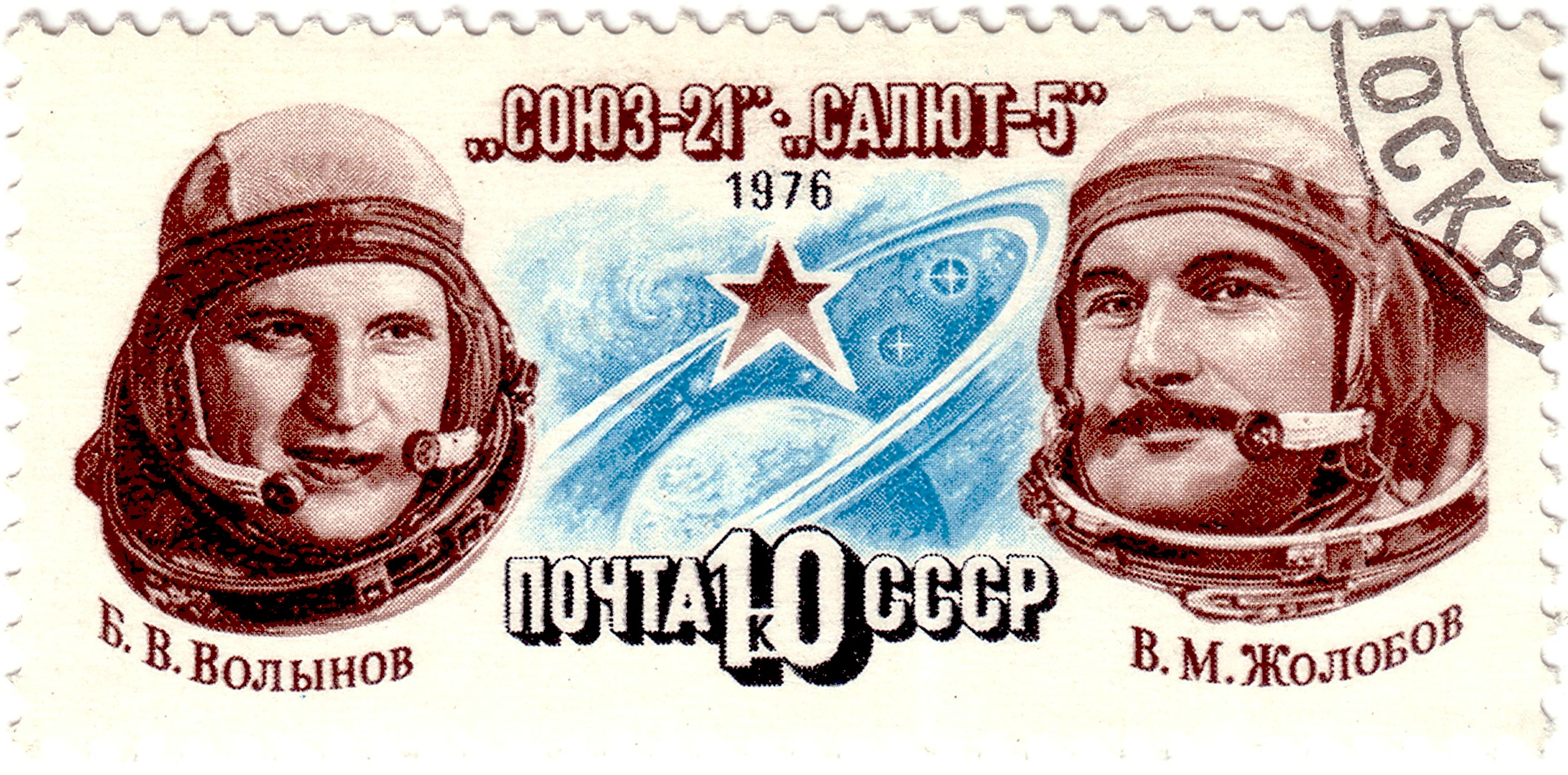
B. V. Volynov and V. M. Zholobov on a Soviet 10-kopek stamp

- Soyuz 21 was launched into orbit by the Soviet Union, carrying cosmonauts Boris Volynov and Vitaly Zholobov to the new Salyut 5 space station. The two spacefarers showed the interior of the station on live television to viewers in the U.S.S.R. and Eastern Europe two days after arriving on a mission that appeared to be planned to last at least 54 days. Volynov and Zholobov would depart Salyut 5 on August 24, earlier than planned, because of Zholobov's illness from "an acrid odor that developed in the environmental control system."
- The white-minority government of South Africa agreed to abandon its policy of requiring black students to be instructed in the Afrikaans language, the issue that had led to the violent June 16 Soweto uprising that had killed 176 people in Johannesburg. Education Minister Michiel C. Botha made the announcement after negotiating the issue with leaders of South Africa's black majority.
- Queen Elizabeth II of the United Kingdom began a "Bicentennial tour" of several locations in the former 13 British colonies that had become the nucleus of the United States, arriving in Philadelphia on the 412 foot (126 m) royal yacht Britannia, where she was greeted by a crowd of 5,000 people. In an address to Americans, she began "I speak to you as the direct descendant of King George III. He was the last crowned sovereign to rule in this country..." and added "It seems to me that Independence Day, the Fourth of July, should be celebrated as much in Britain as in America... in sincere gratitude to the Founding Fathers of the great Republic for having taught Britain a very valuable lesson. We lost the American colonies because we lacked that statesmanship 'to know the right time and the manner of yielding what is impossible to keep.'" She followed by stops at the White House in Washington, D.C., New York City, Charlottesville, Virginia, and Providence and Newport, Rhode Island.
- Born: Dimitrije Banjac, popular Serbian comedian and producer known for Državni posao; in Novi Sad, SR Serbia, Yugoslavia
- Died: Marshal Zhu De, 89, Communist Chinese officer who had led the People's Liberation Army to victory over the Nationalists in 1949, later the nominal Head of State of the People's Republic of China since in his honorary capacity of chairman of the National People's Congress Standing Committee

== July 7, 1976 (Wednesday) ==
- German left-wing women terrorists Monika Berberich, Gabriella Rollnick, Juliane Plambeck and Inge Viett escaped from the Lehrter Straße maximum security prison in West Berlin.
- David Steel became the new leader of the UK's Liberal Party in the aftermath of the scandal which forced out Jeremy Thorpe.
- Born:
  - Natasha Collins, English actress whose career was ended by a 2001 auto accident; in Luton, Bedfordshire (d. of drug overdose, 2008)
  - Bérénice Bejo, Argentine-born French film actress and César Award-winner for The Artist; in Buenos Aires
  - Hamish Linklater, American TV actor and comedian known for The New Adventures of Old Christine; in New York City
  - Grettell Valdez, Mexican telenovela actress
- Died:
  - Gustav Heinemann, 77, former president of West Germany from 1969 to 1974
  - Norman Foster, 72, American film actor, screenwriter and director known for the Charlie Chan and Mr. Moto mysteries.

== July 8, 1976 (Thursday) ==
- Palapa-A1, the first satellite built in Indonesia, was launched from Cape Canaveral in the United States at 6:31 pm local time (6:31 am on July 9 Indonesian time) as a communications satellite for the Indonesian corporation Indosat.
- Former U.S. President Richard M. Nixon, who had resigned from office on August 9, 1974, in the wake of accusations of interfering with investigation of the Watergate scandal, became the first former president to be disbarred from the practice of law. The 4 to 1 opinion of the New York state court's appellate division concluded that Nixon had obstructed "the due administration of justice", a violation of the state Code of Professional Responsibility for lawyers. The findings on the charges, brought by the New York City bar association, marked the first time that Nixon had ever "been found guilty by an official body of charges relating to Watergate."
- Born: Ellen MacArthur, English yacht sailor who broke the world record for fastest solo sailing trip around the world with a 71-day voyage in 2005; in Whatstandwell, Derbyshire

== July 9, 1976 (Friday) ==
- American reporters and civilian officials were allowed for the first time to see the U.S. Department of Defense's National Military Command Center, the "war room" located inside the Pentagon. The invited guests were admitted to the war room, "normally restricted to individuals holding only a top-secret clearance or higher."
- Born:
  - Fred Savage, American child actor known as the star of The Wonder Years; in Chicago
  - Jochem Uytdehaage, Dutch speed skater and 2002 Winter Olympics gold medalist who held the world record in the 5000 and 10,000 meter races from 2002 to 2005; in Utrecht
- Died: Tom Yawkey, 73, American owner of the Boston Red Sox major league baseball team, from leukemia

== July 10, 1976 (Saturday) ==
- Ethiopia hanged 18 military leaders and merchants who had been convicted of "crimes ranging from plotting a coup to food hoarding." The most prominent deaths were those of Ethiopian Air Force Major Sisay Harte, who was the third-ranking member of the governing Provisional Military Administrative Council, and General Getachew Nadew, the Ethiopian Military Governor of Eritrea.
- Four foreign mercenary soldiers, one American and three British, were executed by firing squad in Angola, following their trial in Luanda. Daniel Gearhart of Kensington, Maryland, had quit a low-paying job at the U.S. National Institutes of Health five months earlier after having advertised his services in Soldier of Fortune magazine, had left "on the promise of a $300-a-week salary and a $1,000 bonus as a mercenary", and left behind a wife and four children. He had been captured only four days after arriving in Angola before participating in Canada. Costas Georgiou, a native of Cyprus and British Army veteran who called himself "Colonel Tony Callan", died along with Britons John Derek Barker and Andrew McKenzie. Angola's president Agostinho Neto rejected pleas for clemency and commented "Every Angolan remembers the vile and cruel behavior of the mercenaries who have sown death and despair in African countries in return for pay, trying in this way to put a brake on the higher interests of a people for a few coins."
- An explosion in Seveso, Italy, polluted a large area in the neighborhood of Milano, with many evacuations and a large number of people affected by the toxic cloud.
- Born: Adrian Grenier, American TV actor known for Entourage; in Santa Fe, New Mexico

== July 11, 1976 (Sunday) ==
- The Miss Universe international beauty competition was won for the first time by a citizen of Israel, as 20-year-old Rina Messinger was crowned as the top finisher from 72 competitors in Hong Kong.
- Died: Leon de Greiff, 80, popular Colombian poet

== July 12, 1976 (Monday) ==
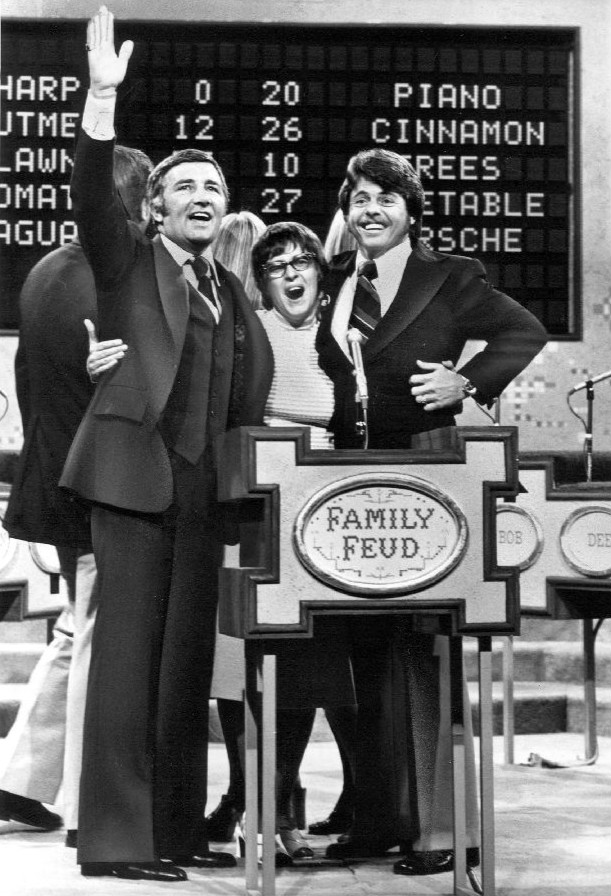
Dawson on Family Feud

- The game show Family Feud debuted in the United States on ABC-TV at 1:30 p.m. Eastern time, with British actor and comedian Richard Dawson as its host. The format required contestants to guess the most popular results of audience survey questions, and became the highest-rated daytime-TV game show within a year. Other than the years 1986-1987 and 1996-1998, Family Feud has been a staple of American network and syndicated television.
- Seven people were killed, and two others were wounded in a mass shooting in the library at California State University in Fullerton. The killer, a mentally-ill custodian at the university, walked into the library, shot nine employees, fled the campus and called police. He would be found not guilty by reason of insanity and spent the rest of his life in state hospitals.
- Representatives of the nine nations of the European Economic Community (the EEC, referred to at the time as the "Common Market") reached an agreement in Brussels on the restructuring of the European Parliament, whose members would be elected directly for the first time rather than appointed by their nation's governments. The new, 410-member unicameral body was apportioned by allotting 81 seats apiece to the four largest nations (France, West Germany, Italy and the United Kingdom), followed by 25 to the Netherlands, 24 to Belgium, 16 to Denmark, 15 to Ireland and six to Luxembourg. At the time, the appointed assembly had 198 seats (36 each to the "Big Four" nations, 14 each to the Netherlands and Belgium, 10 each to Denmark and Ireland, and 6 for Luxembourg).
- The Major League Baseball Players Association entered a new collective bargaining agreement with the owners of baseball's National League and American League teams that effectively gave away the unlimited free agency that had been won in December with the Seitz decision, but guaranteeing that the reserve clause would not be restored to player contracts.
- Barbara Jordan became the first African-American to be a keynote speaker at a major political convention.
- Born:
  - Anna Friel, British TV and film actress and BAFTA Award winner; in Rochdale, Lancashire
  - Major General Prince C. Johnson III, Chief of Staff of the Armed Forces of Liberia since 2018; in Monrovia
  - Kyrsten Sinema, former U.S. Representative and (since 2019) the first woman U.S. Senator for Arizona; in Tucson, Arizona
  - Nabor Vargas Garcia, Mexican drug lord and co-founder of the criminal enterprise Los Zetas; in Pachuca, Hidalgo state
- Died:
  - James Wong Howe, 76, Chinese-born American cinematographer and winner of two Academy Awards
  - Lewis Deschler, 71, legislative official who had served as the parliamentary procedure adviser to the Speaker of the House of the U.S. House of Representatives from 1928 to 1974.
  - James Stout, 62, American horse-racing jockey and National Museum of Racing and Hall of Fame enshrinee
  - Guillermo Tolentino, 85, Philippine sculptor

== July 13, 1976 (Tuesday) ==
- Former prime minister Giulio Andreotti of Italy was asked by President Giovanni Leone to form a new government of ministers from a coalition of Andreotti's Democrazia Cristiana party and the Italian Socialist Party.
- The National League All-Stars defeated the American League All-Stars, 7 to 1, to win the 1976 Major League Baseball All-Star Game at Veterans Stadium in Philadelphia.
- Born:
  - Emma Bonney, English billiards player and 13-time world billiards title winner; in Portsmouth, Hampshire
  - Lisa Riley, English soap opera actress known for Emmerdale; in Bury, Lancashire
  - Oleg Sentsov, Ukrainian filmmaker and activist who was imprisoned in Russia for four years after the Russian invasion of Crimea; in Simferopol, Ukrainian SSR, Soviet Union
- Died: William Haoui, 67, the leader of Lebanon's right-wing Phalangist Christian political party was shot and killed by a sniper while surveying Tel el-Zaatar, where the Phalangist militia had recently defeated the Palestinian Muslim attempt to take over Beirut.

== July 14, 1976 (Wednesday) ==
- A 6.5 magnitude earthquake killed 573 people in and around the city of Singaraja in Indonesia, in the Buleleng Regency area located on the north side of the island of Bali.

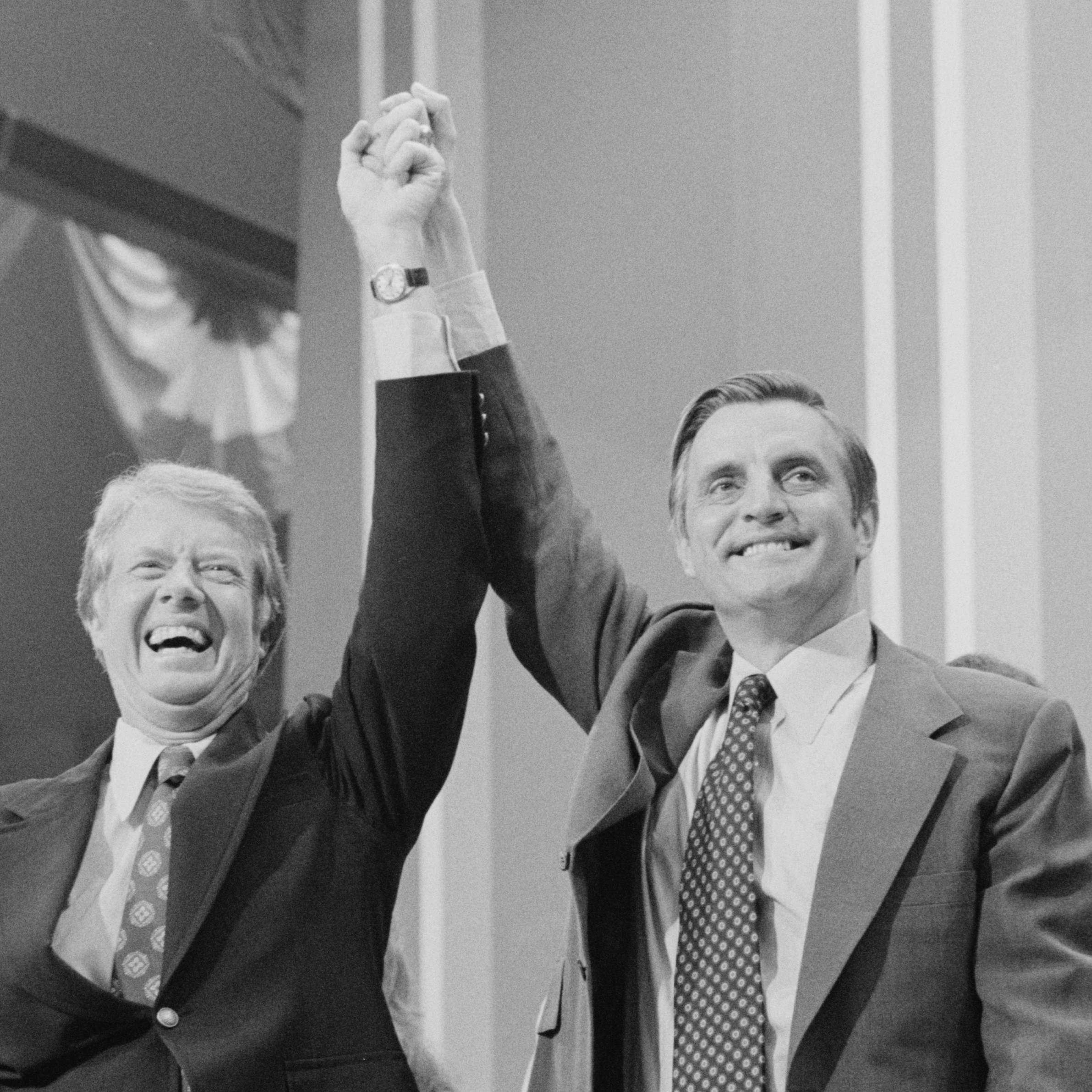
Jimmy Carter and running mate Walter Mondale

- On the first round of balloting, former Georgia Governor Jimmy Carter won the Democratic Party nomination for candidate in the upcoming U.S. presidential election. The final vote for Carter at the Democratic National Convention at Madison Square Garden in New York City was 2,338 1/2 for Carter, and 330 and 301 for his closest competitors, U.S. Representative Morris K. Udall of Arizona and Governor Jerry Brown of California, respectively.
- By a vote of 130 to 124, Canada's House of Commons approved the permanent abolition of the death penalty, which had been the maximum punishment for murder, treason or piracy. The ban became law on July 16 upon being given royal assent. The only remaining capital crime was for treason within the Canadian military. In 1967, a five-year moratorium on capital punishment had been passed, and no legal executions had taken place in Canada since the moratorium expired in 1972. The last executions in Canada had been carried out on December 11, 1962, when convicted murderers Ronald Turpin and Arthur Lucas were hanged.
- A border clash between the armies of El Salvador and Honduras killed several Salvadoran soldiers. On July 22, the Chiefs of Staff of both nations' armies met at the town of El Amatillo on the Honduras side of the border and agreed to a cease-fire, to be enforced by placing their sides of the border under direct military control.
- Portuguese Army General António Ramalho Eanes was sworn in to office as the new president of Portugal after having been elected on June 27.
- Aparicio Méndez, a 71-year-old lawyer, and the chairman of the 51-member ruling Council of the Nation, was appointed by the council to be the new president of Uruguay to replace acting president Alberto Demicheli effective September 1. The council had removed Juan Maria Bordaberry from office on June 12.
- Born: Teddy Afro (stage name for Tewodros Kassahun Germamo), popular Ethiopian singer and dissident; in Addis Ababa
- Died: Joachim Peiper, 61, Nazi German war criminal and SS officer who had been convicted of the Malmedy massacre of American prisoners of war, was killed in a fire at his home in the village of Traves, Haute-Saône in France by French survivors of the war. He had been living in France since 1956 after serving nine years of a life sentence.

== July 15, 1976 (Thursday) ==
- Three men kidnapped 26 schoolchildren and their bus driver who were returning from an afternoon swimming pool excursion in Chowchilla, California. After stopping the bus at gunpoint at 4:00 p.m. the group transferred their captives from the bus to two vans, and drove them 120 miles (190 km) to the Cal Rock Quarry in Livermore, California. Arriving at 3:00 the next morning, the group forced the 27 captives into a truck and buried the vehicle in the quarry. The kidnappers, Frederick Newhall Woods IV (whose father owned the rock quarry) and brothers James Schoenfeld and Richard Schoenfeld, had intended to call a US$5,000,000 ransom demand to the Chowchilla Police Department, but were unable to get through because parents of the missing Dairyland Union School students (who ranged in age from 5 to 14) and the media had tied up the department's phone lines. The bus driver Ed Ray, and the oldest student, Michael Marshall, spent hours in forcing open the top of the truck and escaped at 7:00 that evening. Richard Schoenfeld turned himself in to the police on July 23, while the other two were arrested after two weeks as fugitives. James Schofield and Woods would be sentenced to life imprisonment with no possibility of parole, while Richard Schofield was given life with a chance of parole because he had been a minor at the time of participating.
- Soviet dissident and political writer Andrei Amalrik, known for his 1970 essay "Will the Soviet Union Survive Until 1984?", left the country permanently after being given the choice of imprisonment or going into exile with his family. He and his wife boarded an Aeroflot flight in Moscow and flew to Amsterdam in the Netherlands. Amalrik's essay had resulted in his arrest and exile to Siberia in 1970, and after coming back from exile in 1975, he was barred from living in Moscow. His last violation of the terms of his parole had ended with his arrest on February 20. Before leaving, Amalrik told a crowd of supporters and western reporters, "My departure is of a temporary character." Amalrik never returned, and was killed in an auto accident near the city of Guadalajara in Spain on November 12, 1980.
- Jimmy Carter was nominated for U.S. president at the Democratic National Convention in New York City.
- The day after his nomination as the Democratic Party candidate for U.S. President, former Georgia Governor Jimmy Carter selected U.S. Senator Walter F. Mondale of Minnesota to be his running mate. As part of the Carter—Mondale ticket, Mondale would be elected Vice President of the United States on November 2.
- Presidents Anwar Sadat of Egypt and Jaafar Nimeiry of the Sudan signed a mutual defense treaty at a meeting in the port of Alexandria.
- Born:
  - Jim Jones (stage name for Joseph Guillermo Jones II), successful American hip hop music artist; in New York City
  - Diane Kruger, German-born American film and TV actress; in Algermissen, West Germany
  - Faraz Anwar, Pakistani heavy metal guitarist; in Karachi
- Died: Paul Gallico, 78, American novelist whose thriller The Poseidon Adventure, was successfully adapted to film

== July 16, 1976 (Friday) ==
- Albert Spaggiari and his gang broke into the vault of the Société Generale Bank in Nice, in France and robbed its contents undetected during the weekend. An estimated $12 million of assets were stolen from the bank by the gang, which had driven into the sewer tunnels running beneath the building and then created an opening in the floor of the vault.
- The African nation of Nigeria began a walkout of teams from the 1976 Summer Olympics in Montreal, as it withdrew its 45 Olympic athletes to protest New Zealand's "continued collaboration with racist South Africa." Taiwan withdrew its team in protest because the International Olympic Committee would not allow it to compete under the name "Republic of China", or to fly its national flag or play its anthem in the event of a medal award. The Canadian government had initially said that it would not allow the 43 athletes from Taiwan to participate in the Olympics because of the presence of the People's Republic of China, but reversed the decision after protests and offered to allow participation on the condition that the country not identify itself as the Republic of China.
- Born: Romain Haguenauer, French ice dancing choreographer and coach; in Lyon
- Died:
  - Carmelo Soria, 54, Spanish-born Chilean dissident and United Nations diplomat who had been using his diplomatic immunity status to arrange asylum for endangered Chileans in foreign embassies, was found dead, two days after he had been kidnapped and tortured.
  - Billie von Bremen, 66, American sprint runner and gold medalist in the 1932 Summer Olympics

== July 17, 1976 (Saturday) ==
- Canada hosted the Olympic games for the first time as the 1976 Summer Olympics began with opening ceremonies in Montreal. Athletes representing 94 nations participated in the opening ceremony, while another 25 teams stayed away.
- East Timor was declared the 27th province of Indonesia. The eastern half of the island of Timor had been a colony of Portugal until 1975, and was invaded by Indonesia shortly after independence activists on the island attempted to declare East Timor to be an independent nation.
- WBA World welterweight boxing champion Ángel Espada was knocked out in the second round of title bout in Mexicali by José Cuevas, an 18-year-old challenger.
- Born:
  - Luke Bryan, bestselling American country music singer; in Leesburg, Georgia
  - Matt Holmes, Australian TV actor known for Sea Patrol; in Albury, New South Wales
- Died:
  - Carol Park, 30, English housewife posthumously called "The Lady in the Lake", vanished after having last been seen in her home in Leece in Cumbria. Her husband, Gordon Park, didn't report her disappearance until six weeks later, and said that his wife had said she was leaving him to live with another man. Her body would be discovered 21 years later, on August 13, 1997, by amateur divers who found her corpse on an underwater ledge 75 feet (23 m) below the surface of a large lake, Coniston Water. After being convicted of her murder in 2005 and sentenced to life in prison, Gordon Park would hang himself in 2020.
  - Lucie Mannheim, 77, German singer and actress

== July 18, 1976 (Sunday) ==
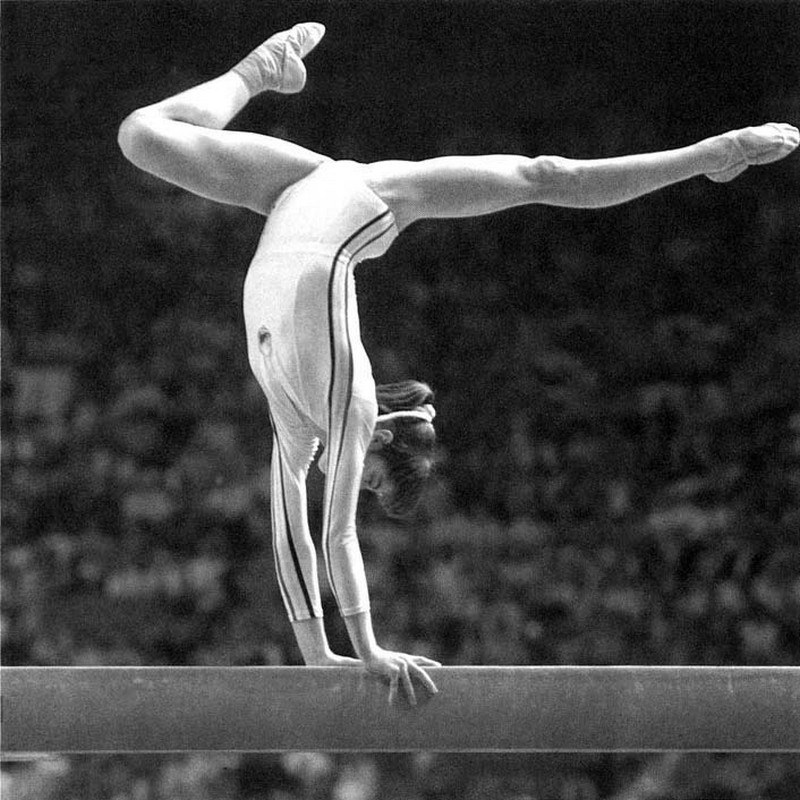
Nadia Comăneci

- Nadia Comăneci of Romania became the first gymnast in Olympic history to receive a perfect score (10.00), after being judged perfect in her performance on the uneven parallel bars as part of the compulsory gymnastics exercises event, and went on to win the first of six gold medals. The opinion of the judges was protested by the Soviet gymnastics team, without success. Comaneci had been judged perfect in lower-level competitions prior to appearing in Montreal; a press report noted at the time that her mark was "the first in modern Olympic history but Nadia's 17th." According to another observer, a perfect score had been given by one of the four judges in Olympic competition in the 1964 Summer Olympics in Tokyo but "at least three of the four judges must score 10.00 before the overall score comes up the same." The 14-year-old prodigy of the gymnastics school of Béla Károlyi would achieve six more perfect scores and gold medals before the games concluded.
- Diallo Telli, the minister of justice for the West African nation of Guinea since 1972, and the secretary general of the Organisation of African Unity (OAU) from 1964 to 1972, was arrested at his home and charged with attempting to overthrow the government of Guinean President Sekou Toure. The indictment followed discussions in a special commission of inquiry headed by Mamadi Keïta, the Minister of Education and half-brother of Toure's wife. Telli was imprisoned at Camp Boiro, where he and four other arrested government ministers would die of enforced starvation in 1977. Telli's arrest, along with those of five other people, was announced by Toure in a radio address on July 24. Two days before his arrest, Radio Conakry had announced that 19 people had been rounded up after the discovery of a plot to assassinate Toure.
- Born: Elsa Pataky (stage name for Elsa Lafuente Medianu), Spanish stage, film and TV actress known for The Fast and the Furious series of films; in Madrid

== July 19, 1976 (Monday) ==
- The International Olympic Committee (IOC) announced that 17 African nations were withdrawing their teams from the 1976 Summer Olympics in Montreal, and that 465 athletes had either vacated the Olympic Village quarters or were making final plans to do so. The boycott, made two days after the Olympic games had gotten underway, came after the IOC refused to expel the New Zealand Olympic team as a response to New Zealand's hosting of a tour of the Springboks rugby league team from South Africa.
- Saint Pierre and Miquelon, located off of the coast of Canada's province of Newfoundland and Labrador, became an overseas department of France.
- The Soviet Union placed a super-carrier ship in the Mediterranean Sea for the first time as the Kiev, its largest naval vessel up to that time, passed through the straits of Bosporus and the Dardanelles.
- Sagarmatha National Park was created in Nepal.
- Fencer Boris Onischenko of the Soviet Union Olympic team, a silver medalist in the 1972 Olympic modern pentathlon, was disqualified after it was discovered that he was using an electronic device within his épée sword to register a point whether the sword struck his opponent or not. The cheating was discovered when his opponent, Jeremy Fox of Great Britain, leaped out of the way of Onischenko's thrust and a score was registered anyway.
- Born:
  - Benedict Cumberbatch, English stage, TV and film actor and Emmy Award winner; in Hammersmith, London
  - Eric Prydz, Swedish record composer; in Täby

== July 20, 1976 (Tuesday) ==
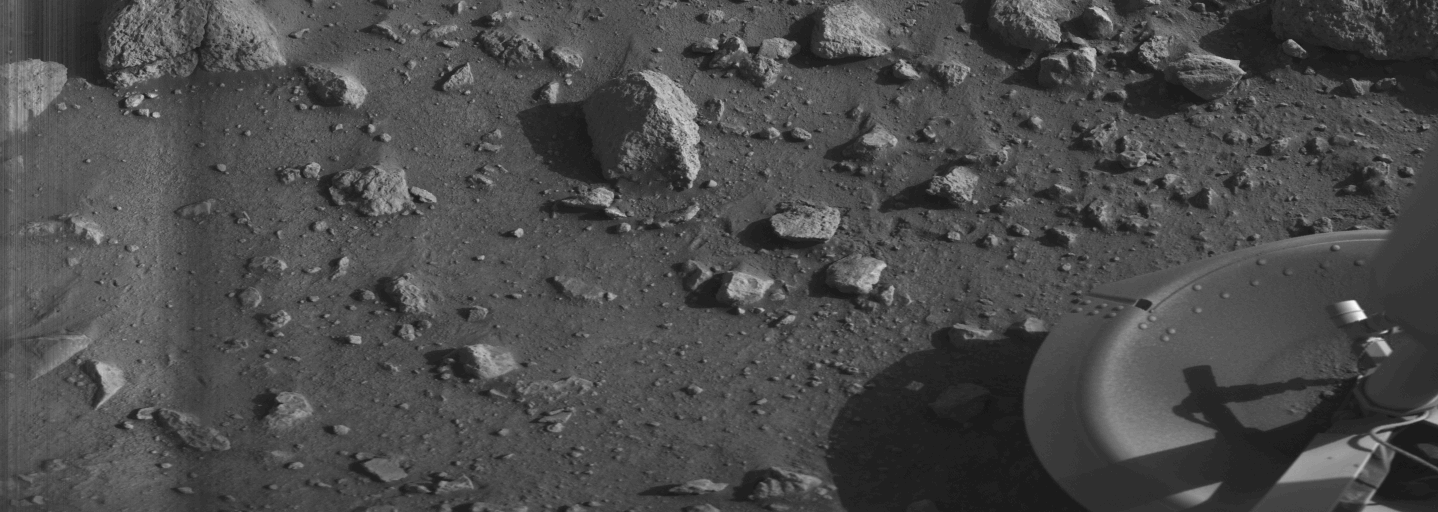
The first picture taken by the Viking lander from Mars

- The Viking 1 lander successfully landed on Mars at 11:53:06 UTC (7:53 a.m. Eastern time), touching down at Chryse Planitia after a descent from the Viking orbiter more than three hours earlier. The lander, the first U.S. craft to land on Mars, transmitted the first-ever pictures from the surface. Chemical analysis of the Martian atmosphere showed "a small component of nitrogen".
- U.S. baseball player Hank Aaron, holder of the record for most career home runs in Major League Baseball since breaking the record of Babe Ruth in 1974, hit the 755th and final home run of his career, playing for the Milwaukee Brewers at home against the California Angels. He retired at the end of the 1976 season. Aaron's MLB record of 755 would stand for 31 years until broken on August 7, 2007 by Barry Bonds of the San Francisco Giants.
- American criminal Gary Gilmore was arrested after murdering two Brigham Young University students in separate incidents in Utah. He would later become the first person in the United States to be executed after the restoration of the death penalty. The day before his arrest, Gilmore had killed Max Jensen, a 25-year-old night attendant at a Sinclair gas station, during a robbery in Orem, Utah. He followed hours later with the killing of Bennie Bushnell, a night manager at the City Central Motel in Provo. In both cases, the victims had cooperated with Gilmore's instructions to lie face down, and he shot both in the back of the head anyway. Gilmore was caught after he accidentally shot himself in the hand while attempting to dispose of the murder weapon, a .22-caliber pistol. Convicted of Jensen's murder on October 7 and given the death sentence the same day, Gilmore refused to appeal the verdict or the sentence and would be executed by firing squad on January 17, 1977, less than six months after the murders, becoming the first person to be legally executed in the United States since the restoration of the death penalty.
- The United States withdrew its last combat troops from Thailand and Indochina after 26 years. U.S. Air Force Master Sergeant George Leroy Davis, designated by the U.S. Air Force to be the last combat soldier, boarded a Cathay Pacific airliner with his wife and two children, and departed at 10:30 in the morning. About 250 American military advisers remained as part of military aid agreement between the U.S. and Thailand. At the height of the American presence in Thailand, 48,000 troops were stationed in 93 installations around the Asian kingdom.

== July 21, 1976 (Wednesday) ==
- A bomb placed by the Irish Republican Army killed Christopher Ewart-Biggs, the British Ambassador to Ireland, as well as his secretary, Judith Cooke. Ewart-Biggs had been picked up at the British ambassador's official residence on the south outskirts of Dublin and was 150 yards (140 m) from home when the vehicle ran over the mine packed with at least 50 pounds (23 kg) of explosives at 9:32 in the morning. The Ambassador and Britain's Under Secretary of State for Northern Ireland, Brian Cubbon, were on their way to a meeting with Irish Foreign Minister Garret FitzGerald. The bomb itself had been placed in a culvert beneath the road and was detonated from 200 yards (180 m) away by three men. Cubban and the chauffeur of the Jaguar limousine, Brian O'Driscoll, were injured. Ewart-Biggs had become the Ambassador only two weeks earlier and was only 54 years old at the time of his assassination.

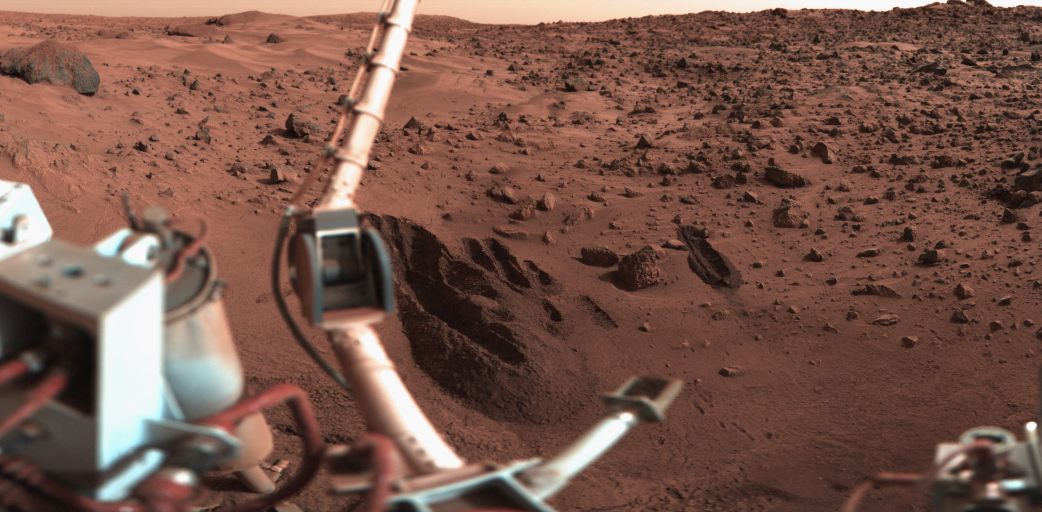
Trenches dug by Viking 1 on the Martian surface

- The first ever color photographs of Mars (as opposed to the black and white pictures sent the day before) were transmitted from the Viking 1 lander the day after its arrival on the planet, and confirmed that the soil and rocks were a reddish color, similar to rust. The more surprising discovery was that the sky on Mars was light blue, which American scientists believed was from a high amount of dust and water vapor in the thin Martian atmosphere.
- Born:
  - Kang Sung-yeon, South Korean film and TV actress
  - Jaime Murray, English TV actress; in Hammersmith, London
- Died:
  - Colonel Frédéric Geille, 79, French Air Force officer who developed the first French paratrooper unit
  - Earle Combs, 77, American major league baseball outfielder enshrined in the Baseball Hall of Fame
  - Lieutenant Colonel Abu Taher, 37, Bangladesh Army officer, was hanged for treason for attempting a coup d'etat in November.

== July 22, 1976 (Thursday) ==
- Japan made its last payment of war reparations to the Philippines for its actions during World War II. On May 9, 1956, Japan had signed an agreement to make payments for 20 years to the Philippine government for 198 billion Japanese yen, equivalent to $550,000,000.
- Born: Yu Bo, Chinese film actor; in Shenyang, Liaoning province
- Died: Mortimer Wheeler, 85, British archaeologist

== July 23, 1976 (Friday) ==
- The last Chicago College All-Star Game, a once-popular exhibition matchup between a team of college football all-stars against the defending National Football League champion, was played at Soldier Field in Chicago and ended by a massive downpour after less than three quarters had been played. Many of the fans in attendance rushed onto the field in a riot and caused sufficient damage that the annual game— which the All-Stars had not won in the past 13 years— was never played again.
- Mário Soares took office as the first Socialist Prime Minister of Portugal, after nearly two months of attempting to form a coalition government following the April 25 election for the Assembly of the Republic.
- Born: Judit Polgár, Hungarian chess grandmaster with the highest ever ranking for a female; at age 15 in 1991, she was the youngest-ever grandmaster, female or male
- Died:
  - Basil Hopko, 72, Slovak Greek Catholic Church bishop who was persecuted after the Communist takeover of Czechoslovakia in 1950. In 2003, he would be beatified by Pope John Paul II and is under consideration for canonization as a Roman Catholic saint.
  - Martin Wickramasinghe, 86, Sri Lankan author and poet

== July 24, 1976 (Saturday) ==
- South Africa's national rugby league team, nicknamed the Springboks, defeated New Zealand's team, the All-Blacks, 16 to 7 in the first match of the Springboks' controversial tour of New Zealand. In protest over South Africa's discriminatory apartheid policy and its recent suppression of the Soweto Uprising that had killed 178 people in June, thirty African nations had withdrawn from the 1976 Summer Olympic games.
- A 20-year-old park ranger at the Kings Island "Lion Country Safari" wildlife preserve in Ohio was killed by a lion. John McCann was found more than 15 feet away from his vehicle, having gotten out while on duty.
- Died:
  - Afro Basaldella, 64, Italian artist generally referred to as "Afro"
  - Paul Morand, 88, French short-story author and novelist

== July 25, 1976 (Sunday) ==
- The Viking 1 orbiter took photos of the Cydonia region of the planet Mars, capturing the now-famous picture of the Face on Mars, which NASA released six days later.
- A computer won a chess tournament against human opponents for the first time, when the Chess 4.5 computer's moves and responses defeated all five players in the Class B (1600–1799) division of the annual Paul Masson chess tournament in Saratoga, California.
- Italian mobster Renato Vallanzasca escaped from prison after getting himself hospitalized and taking advantage of the lone policeman assigned to guard him. For the next seven months, he committed 70 armed robberies before being recaptured.
- A 30-year-old taxi driver in Washington, D.C., was shot and killed after scaling the fence surrounding the grounds of the White House and advancing toward the Executive Mansion with a long metal pipe. The intruder, Chester M. Plummer, attempted to strike U.S. Army PFC Charles A. Garland of the Executive Protective Service after being ordered to stop. U.S. President Ford was at home at the time of the shooting at 9:35 at night, but was unaware of it until he was informed later.

== July 26, 1976 (Monday) ==
- In Los Angeles, Ronald Reagan announced his choice of liberal Republican U.S. Senator Richard Schweiker as his vice presidential running mate, in an effort to woo moderate Republican delegates away from front runner President Gerald Ford in advance of the Republican National Convention.

== July 27, 1976 (Tuesday) ==
- The record for fastest airspeed was broken for the first and second time in more than nine years, as Captain Eldon W. Joersz and Major George T. Morgan Jr., both of the U.S. Air Force, departed in an SR-71A Blackbird supersonic reconnaissance jet from Beale Air Force Base in California. They reached a maximum speed of 2,193.167 miles per hour (3,529.560 km/h), becoming the first people to fly faster than 3,500 km/h. Earlier in the day, the same airplane flown by Major Adolphus H. Bledsoe, Jr., pilot, and Major John T. Fuller, RSO had set a new record of 2,092.29 miles per hour (3,367.21 km/h). The official record has stood for more than 45 years.
- On the same day, Captain Robert C. Helt and Major Larry A. Elliott set the record for the highest absolute altitude on a sustained flight in a crewed aircraft after departing from Beale AFB as they reached 85,069 feet (25,929 m) (more than 16 miles) in altitude in SR-71 serial number 61-7962.
- Former Japanese Prime Minister Kakuei Tanaka was arrested and placed in a jail cell at the Tokyo House of Detention in Kosuge. He had been charged with having accepted $1.67 million in bribes from the Lockheed Aircraft Corporation. After three weeks in jail, Tanaka was able to post a bond of ¥200 million Japanese yen (equivalent at the time to US$690,000) on August 17 to obtain his release while waiting for his trial, which would not take place until 1983.
- The United Kingdom broke diplomatic relations with Uganda following the hijacking of Air France Flight 139 and the murder of one of its hostages. The decision "was the first time Britain had severed relations with a Commonwealth nation".
- Delegates who had attended an American Legion convention at The Bellevue-Stratford Hotel in Philadelphia began dying from a form of pneumonia that would eventually be recognized as the first outbreak of Legionnaires' disease. Retired U.S. Air Force Captain Ray Brennan, a 61-year-old veteran who had returned from the convention to his home in Sayre, Pennsylvania on July 24 feeling tired, was the first fatality. Within four days after the convention ended, 11 Legionnaires in Pennsylvania had died from respiratory problems, and the adjutant of the Pennsylvania organization said "They all had one thing in common, they were all at the Philadelphia convention between July 21 and 24." In all, 29 people died from the illness. The national convention had been held over four days from July 21 to July 24. The Bellevue-Stratford, at one time the finest hotel in Philadelphia, would announce on November 10 that it would be closing permanently.
- The United States men's basketball team won the Olympic gold medal, defeating Yugoslavia, 95 to 74. The Soviet team, which had won the 1972 gold medal in a controversial game, had been defeated by Yugoslavia the day before in the semifinal, 89 to 84, preventing the expected and long-awaited rematch between the U.S. and U.S.S.R. teams.
- Soviet chess grandmaster Viktor Korchnoi defected to the West while in Amsterdam, where he received political asylum from the Netherlands government. Korchnoi had competed in a tournament while in the Dutch capital and was scheduled to fly to Frankfurt in West Germany and then to return to the Soviet Union.
- English rock musician John Lennon, formerly of The Beatles, was granted permission by the U.S. Immigration and Naturalization Service to become a permanent resident alien of the United States. INS Judge Ira Fieldsteel, who had rejected a previous resident-alien application in 1973 because of Lennon's 1968 conviction on cannabis possession, reviewed affidavits from a number of celebrities and noted that the federal government had dropped objections, and granted Lennon green card number A17-597-321. A commentator for The New York Times summed up the event with the words, "Yesterday, all of John Lennon's troubles seemed so far away and now it looks as though he's here to stay."

== July 28, 1976 (Wednesday) ==
- A pair of massive earthquakes killed over 650,000 people in and around the northeastern Chinese city of Tangshan in Heibei province. At five seconds before 3:43 in the morning local time (19:42:55 on July 27 UTC), a 7.6 magnitude quake struck with an epicenter 12 kilometres (7.5 mi) below the western side of Tangshan. Fifteen hours later, at 6:45 in the evening (10:45:36 on July 28 UTC), a 7.0 magnitude aftershock followed. The official death toll would later be tallied, in a report by Heibei province officials leaked to the Western press, as 655,237 deaths and 779,000 injuries.
- The crash of Czechoslovak Airlines Flight 001 killed 76 of the 79 people on board. The Ilyushin Il-18B turboprop airplane was arriving at Bratislava at the end of a 45-minute flight from Prague and was coming in too quickly when one of the pilots set a thrust reversal on two engines, causing both engines on the right wing of the airplane to fail. An uncontrollable turn to the right resulted and the aircraft plunged into Lake Zlaté Piesky at 9:37 in the morning. Only three people survived after being pulled from the plane before it sank.
- The Viking 1 lander began the first experiment to find signs of life on another planet as its robot arm scooped up a sample of the fine-grained soil on Mars and poured it into its "automated biological laboratories" built into the spacecraft. Only one of the three samples reached the organic chemical analyzer.
- Born: Jacoby Shaddix, American rock musician in the group Papa Roach; in Mariposa, California
- Died:
  - Christian Ranucci, 22, convicted child murderer, was executed on the guillotine at a prison in Marseille.
  - Maggie Gripenberg, 95, Finnish choreographer

== July 29, 1976 (Thursday) ==
- In New York City, the "Son of Sam" pulled a gun from a paper bag, killing Donna Lauria, who had been driven home to her apartment building at 2860 Buhre Avenue in the Westchester Heights section of the Bronx. The driver, Lauria's friend Jody Valenti, was wounded in the thigh by the killer, who "walked up with a long-barreled pistol, looked directly at them then fired without saying a word." The attack was the first of a series of attacks that would terrorize the city for more than a year by David Berkowitz, who would be arrested, after five murders, on August 10, 1977.
- Tina Anselmi became the first woman ever to serve as a government minister in Italy, as Prime Minister Giulio Andreotti appointed her as Minister of Labor.
- Died:
  - Mickey Cohen, 62, American mobster, from complications of surgery for stomach cancer. Cohen, who had been an organized crime leader in the Los Angeles area in the 1940s and 1950s had been paralyzed since 1963, a year after going to prison on charges of income tax evasion, and was released from incarceration in 1972.
  - John Roselli, 70, American mobster who had testified before a U.S. Senate Select Committee in 1975 about his involvement, along with the late mobster Sam Giancana, in a CIA attempt to assassinated Fidel Castro. Roselli departed from his sister's home in Plantation, Florida, to play golf and never arrived at his destination. His car was found a few days later in a parking garage at the Miami International Airport, with his golf clubs still in the trunk. On August 7, two fishermen found his decomposing body in a metal oil barrel that was floating in Biscayne Bay. Although the barrel had been chopped with holes and weighed down with chains to sink to the bottom of the sea, gases formed by the decomposition process and trapped inside Roselli's body tissue brought him to the surface.

== July 30, 1976 (Friday) ==
- Spain's King Juan Carlos I issued a general amnesty for almost of all of the European kingdom's 650 political prisoners, but said that the pardon would not apply to anyone who had "caused death or endangered the life of any person." In addition, the decree issued by the King at La Coruña in the Galicia region reinstated university professors who had been dismissed for political activities.
- Susilo Bambang Yudhoyono, who would serve as President of Indonesia from 2004 to 2014, married future first lady Ani Yudhoyono
- Bruce Jenner (later Katilyn Jenner) won the gold medal in the men's decathlon at the 1976 Summer Olympics in Montreal.
- In Santiago, Chile, Cruzeiro of Belo Horizonte, Brazil beat River Plate of Buenos Aires, Argentina, 3 to 2, to win the third and deciding game of soccer football's Copa Libertadores de América championship series.
- Died: Rudolf Bultmann, 91, German Lutheran theologian and Biblical scholar

== July 31, 1976 (Saturday) ==
- Flooding of the Big Thompson River in north central Colorado killed 151 people, after a downpour of 10 inches (250 mm) of rain fell in the evening. At about 9:00 p.m., a flash flood swept through the scenic Big Thompson Canyon in southern Larimer County and drowned campers, fishermen, residents of homes along the river and motorists traveling U.S. Highway 34 in an area between Loveland and the vacation resort of Estes Park, Colorado. Initially, 93 deaths were confirmed, but as search parties continued to find bodies, the toll of known deaths would rise to 126 more than three weeks after the disaster.
- Died: Susan Stern, 33, American anti-war activist and terrorist who had been a member of the Weather Underground organization; from drug-related heart failure
