= Punta de los Llanos =

Coordinates: 30°09′S 66°33′W

- Municipality and village
- Interactive map of Punta de los Llanos
- Country: Argentina
- Province: La Rioja Province
- Time zone: UTC−3 (ART)

Punta de los Llanos is a municipality and village in La Rioja Province in northwestern Argentina.
