= Jean-Louis Jeanmaire =

Swiss officer and spy (1910–1992)

Jean-Louis Jeanmaire (25 March 1910 in Biel/Bienne – 29 January 1992) was a brigadier in the Swiss army who passed highly classified Swiss military secrets to the Soviet Union from 1962 until his retirement in 1975.

== Background and significant events ==
He was recruited as a spy by Colonel Vassily Denissenko, the Soviet air attaché.

He never accepted money for the information he passed to the Soviets; his motivation appeared to be the result of bitterness at being passed over for promotion.

The Justice Minister said Jeanmaire shared highly classified information, including top-secret documents. These documents covered not only Jeanmaire’s own department but also detailed information on the Swiss armed forces as a whole, national defence strategies, and, most critically, plans for wartime mobilization. Additionally, he disclosed information about his fellow officers and influential political figures, including their skills, character and family backgrounds.

When John le Carré interviewed Jeanmaire, however, Le Carré reported that the pieces of information given to the Soviet’s were “trinkets” and that the trial was a kangaroo justice, stating "the trial was from Kafka and beyond.” Le Carré reported that Jeanmaire permitted his Russian-born wife, Marie-Louise, to sleep with his apparent handler, Denissenko, and he wrote that Jeanmaire’s motives for betraying secrets seemed to be that "The desire to please Deni, to earn his respect and approval, to woo and possess him - with gifts, including, perhaps, if it had to be, the gift of his own wife - seems, in the middle years of Jeanmaire's life, to have seized hold of this affectionate, frustrated, clever, turbulent simpleton like a grand passion, like a fugue."

Swiss authorities didn't uncover Jeanmaire's actions; it was a Western country, likely West Germany, that exposed him. According to unverified reports (not officially denied), the Soviet Union managed to ensnare Jeanmaire by providing his superiors with fabricated information, information that only Jeanmaire knew. This information was then traced back to his Soviet contacts.

He was sentenced to a prison term of eighteen years but served only twelve due to good conduct. Jeanmaire was released from prison in 1988, and died of natural causes in 1992 in Bern.

== Literature ==
- Urs Widmer: Jeanmaire: ein Stück Schweiz. Verlag der Autoren, Frankfurt am Main 1992 – ISBN 3-88661-136-1 (play)
- John le Carré: Unbearable peace. Harmondsworth 1991 – ISBN 0-14-015204-0
- Jürg Schoch: Fall Jeanmaire, Fall Schweiz. Wie Politik und Medien einen «Jahrhundertverräter» fabrizierten. «hier + jetzt», Verlag für Kultur und Geschichte, Baden 2006 – ISBN 3-03919-026-1
