= LGBTQ rights in Myanmar =

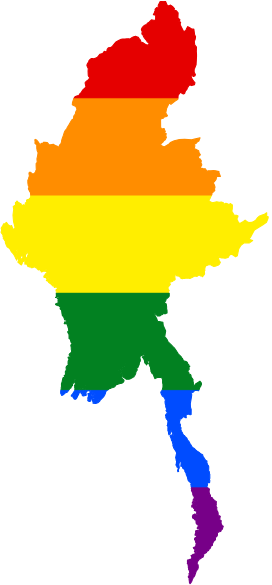
- Myanmar in pride flag colors.
- Legal status: Illegal since 1886 (as Burma)
- Penalty: Up to 10 years with fines (unenforced)
- Gender identity: No
- Military: No
- Discrimination protections: Limited protections

Family rights
- Recognition of relationships: No recognition of same-sex relationships
- Adoption: No

Lesbian, gay, bisexual, transgender, and queer (LGBTQ) people in Myanmar face significant challenges not experienced by non-LGBTQ residents. Same-sex sexual activity is illegal and section 377 of Myanmar's Penal Code 1861, enacted in 1886, subjects same-sex sexual acts (regardless of whether they were consensual or done in private) to a term of imprisonment of up to 10 years in prison. Heterosexual anal intercourse and oral sex are also illegal. Transgender people are subject to police harassment and sexual assault, and their gender identity is not recognised by the state.

During the country's long military dictatorship under the authoritarian State Peace and Development Council between 1988 and 2011, it was difficult to obtain accurate information about the legal or social status of LGBTQ Burmese citizens. Following the 2011–2015 Myanmar political reforms, improvements in media and civil freedoms have allowed LGBTQ people to gain more visibility and support in the country. Despite the 2015 electoral victory of the National League for Democracy, which promised improved human rights and whose leader Aung San Suu Kyi had once called for the decriminalisation of homosexuality, there have been no changes to anti-LGBTQ laws. Nevertheless, LGBTQ activists have noted a growing climate of societal acceptance and tolerance toward LGBTQ people, in line with worldwide trends.

== Legality of same-sex sexual activity ==
Section 377 of the Penal Code prohibits sodomy, whether heterosexual or homosexual. Alongside fines, the prescribed punishment is up to 10 years, although the law has not been strictly enforced. In 2001, an exile group, the All Burma Students' Democratic Front, voted to have the law repealed. This was seen as a victory by the Committee for Lesbigay Rights in Burma, although such a change was considered unlikely to occur given the prevailing political climate against change. In 2013, then-Opposition leader Aung San Suu Kyi called on the country to decriminalise homosexuality, stating that it was hampering efforts to combat HIV in Myanmar. After her party came to power in 2015, it did not change the laws.

LGBTQ people are also targeted under the "shadow law" or "darkness law" in section 35(c) of the Police Act (Burmese: ၁၉၄၅ ခုနှစ်၊ ရဲအက်ဥပဒေ), which allows police to detain anyone they consider behaving suspiciously after sunset. In November 2018, gay activist Aung Myo Htut, also known as "Addy Chen," was arrested under the country's sodomy law.

Other provisions of the Penal Code can also be used against LGBTQ people:

- Sections 269 and 270 make it a crime for a person to negligently spread a sexually transmitted disease.
- Section 290 makes it a crime to commit "a public nuisance", not specified in the code, with fines up to two hundred rupees.
- Sections 292, 293, and 294 make it a crime to make, sell, or distribute "obscene" material or songs to adults or minors and to engage in any obscene acts in public.
- Section 372 prohibits buying or selling a prostitute under the age of eighteen or using a prostitute to engage in illicit sexual relations.
- Section 377 prohibits carnal intercourse with any man, woman, or animal and provides imprisonment varying between life and a term not less than 2 years, but may extend to 10 years and shall also be liable to a fine that shall not be less than four hundred rupees but may extend to one thousand rupees.
- Section 469 prohibits engaging in any marriage ceremony absent of a legal marriage.
- Section 5(j) of the Emergency Provisions Act (Burmese: အရေးပေါ်စီမံမှုအက်ဥပဒေ ) prohibits anything that might affect the morality of an individual, society, or the public negatively.

== Recognition of same-sex relationships ==
Myanmar does not recognise same-sex marriages or civil unions. In 2014, a Burmese same-sex couple drew widespread media attention for holding an unofficial wedding ceremony after having lived together for 10 years. It also triggered a backlash from social conservatives, who queried why the anti-homosexuality laws were not being enforced against them.

== Gender identity and expression ==
Myanmar does not allow transgender people to change the gender assigned to them at birth. Transgender people in Myanmar are subject to rape, mistreatment, or extortion by police, and are often targeted using the "shadow law" in section 35(c) of the Police Act. Generally, there are only three "respectable" career options open to transgender Burmese: beautician, fashion designer, or nat kadaw ("spirit wife" or spirit medium). As a nat kadaw, transgender Burmese people can be afforded respect and veneration otherwise denied to them by Burmese society. Transgender people in Myanmar may face discrimination, family rejection or violence for their identity.

Occult is a local term for the transgender community in Myanmar.

== Discrimination protections ==
Myanmar does not have any enforceable legal protections against discrimination based on sexual orientation or gender identity. Although certain policies mention sexual orientation, these are either symbolic or limited in scope and do not constitute civil rights protections.

For example, the 2019 Child Rights Law includes a non-discrimination clause referencing sexual orientation, but it applies only to children and lacks mechanisms for enforcement. The 2020 MRTV Broadcasting Guidelines encourage avoiding discriminatory media portrayals, but they are non-binding and have no legal penalties. Similarly, the 2022 Gender Policy on Sexual and Reproductive Health and Rights includes LGBTQ individuals as a vulnerable group in the context of healthcare delivery, but this is a planning document, not an enforceable law.

Same-sex sexual activity remains criminalized under Section 377 of the Penal Code, and LGBTQ individuals face arrest, police abuse, and societal discrimination without legal recourse.

== Living conditions ==
=== Public attitudes ===
During the military regime, no organised LGBTQ political or social life was able to exist. Burma's social mores about human sexuality have been described as being "extremely conservative". Gay men are stigmatised, especially if they are living with HIV/AIDS. In the local Buddhist tradition, those born LGBTQ are perceived as facing punishment for sins committed in a past life. Trans women are frequently denied equal access to many professions, which limits their opportunities and may lead to overrepresentation in certain jobs including spirit mediums and sex work. According to Mya Thet Mu, a gay woman from Myanmar, lesbians are often seen as less acceptable than gay men and transgender people.

A poll in 2020 found that 74% of Burmese people agreed that being LGBTQ should be legal (23% disagreed) and 81% agreed that "LGBT people deserve equality and equal treatment just like anyone else in Myanmar" (12% disagreed).

Historically, the combination of official homophobia, limited public awareness, and lack of community role models has rendered LGBTQ people invisible in Burmese society.

=== LGBTQ activism ===
Aung Myo Min is an openly gay man and has been involved in the All Burma Students Democratic Front (ABSDF). In 2005, he talked about his coming out process and the homophobia that exists, even with the pro-democracy opposition. Today, he is involved with exile Burma human rights organisations, including the Campaign for Lesbigay Rights in Burma.

Equality Myanmar (Burmese: ညီမျှခြင်း မြန်မာ) was founded in 2000 "with the goal of empowering the people of Myanmar through human rights education to engage in social transformation and promote a culture of human rights."

In late June 2019, a young gay man, Kyaw Zin Win, working as a librarian at the Myanmar Imperial University in Yangon, died by suicide after continuous harassment and bullying from colleagues. More than 600 people attended his funeral, and a rainbow flag was wrapped around his coffin. The university has launched an investigation into the matter and has suspended three staff members. The Myanmar National Human Rights Commission (Burmese: မြန်မာနိုင်ငံ အမျိုးသားလူ့အခွင့်အရေး ကော်မရှင်) has launched a separate investigation and has called for the enactment of anti-discrimination provisions. PinkNews reported that the issue had "prompted a national conversation" on LGBT issues in the country.

=== Media ===
Despite their criminalisation, LGBTQ people have become more visible in Burma, especially after political reforms. Gay and lesbian couples freely cohabit in major cities like Yangon and Mandalay, though they are not legally allowed to marry. The increased media freedom has also allowed journalists to report on the gay and lesbian community. Same-sex couples have also been able to celebrate ceremonial marriages in major cities without any legal persecution.

In 2003, FocusAsia (Star TV) aired a story about the nat kadaws. The "Utopia Guide to Cambodia, Laos, Myanmar & Vietnam" references "transgender shaman channeling spirits at Myanmar sacred festivals."

In 2016, The Gemini was released and became the first LGBTQ film in the cinema of Myanmar. The film openly railed against the Burmese homosexuality laws.

=== Culture ===
Moe Kyo Ngat Nge Lay Myar (မိုးကြိုးငှက်ငယ်လေးများ) is a Burmese queer theatre and performing troupe. They are a well-known traveling group featuring trans and queers performers. Established during the Ne Win regime, they are the earliest recorded queer performing troupe in Myanmar, often regarded as being responsible for raising public awareness and acceptance towards the LGBTQ community. They often perform at religious festivals across Myanmar. The 2025 short film Thunder Bird portrays Mommy Soe, a second generation leader of the trope.

=== Events ===
Burma celebrated its first gay pride in several cities around the country in 2012, to mark the International Day Against Homophobia, Biphobia and Transphobia. In 2018, officials permitted a public pride party. Almost 6,000 people showed up to the event, a rise from previous times. The number rose further to 10,000 the next day.

== Notable LGBTQ people ==
- Myo Ko Ko San - First Burmese transgender model, LGBTQ rights activist and beauty pageant queen.
- Shin Thant - Leading LGBTQ rights activist.
- Khin San Win - Burmese make-up artist and actress.
- Okkar Min Maung - Burmese actor, model and singer.
- Aung Myo Htut - also known as "Addy Chen", a gay activist who was arrested in November 2018 under the country's sodomy laws.
- Mogok Pauk Pauk - Burmese fashion designer.
- Myo Min Soe - Burmese fashion designer.
- John Lwin - former Burmese model, model agency founder, event organizer, and LGBTQ rights activist.
- Swe Zin Htet - Burmese model and beauty pageant titleholder.
- Gae Gae - Burmese singer.
- Aung Myo Min - Burmese human rights activist and human rights minister in the cabinet of the National Unity Government.

== Summary table ==
Same-sex sexual activity legal	No (Penalty: Up to 10 years in prison with fines, unenforced)
Equal age of consent	No
Anti-discrimination laws in employment only	No
Anti-discrimination laws in the provision of goods and services	No
Anti-discrimination laws in all other areas (incl. indirect discrimination, hate speech)	Yes / No Limited protections.
Same-sex marriages	No
Recognition of same-sex couples	No
Step-child adoption by same-sex couples	No
Joint adoption by same-sex couples	No
Gays and lesbians allowed to serve openly in the military	No
Right to change legal gender	No
Access to IVF for lesbians	No
Commercial surrogacy for gay male couples	No
MSMs allowed to donate blood	Yes

== See also ==
- Human rights in Myanmar
- LGBTQ rights in Asia
