= June 1976 =

Month of 1976

<<	June 1976					>>
Su	Mo	Tu	We	Th	Fr	Sa
		1	2	3	4	5
6	7	8	9	10	11	12
13	14	15	16	17	18	19
20	21	22	23	24	25	26
27	28	29	30

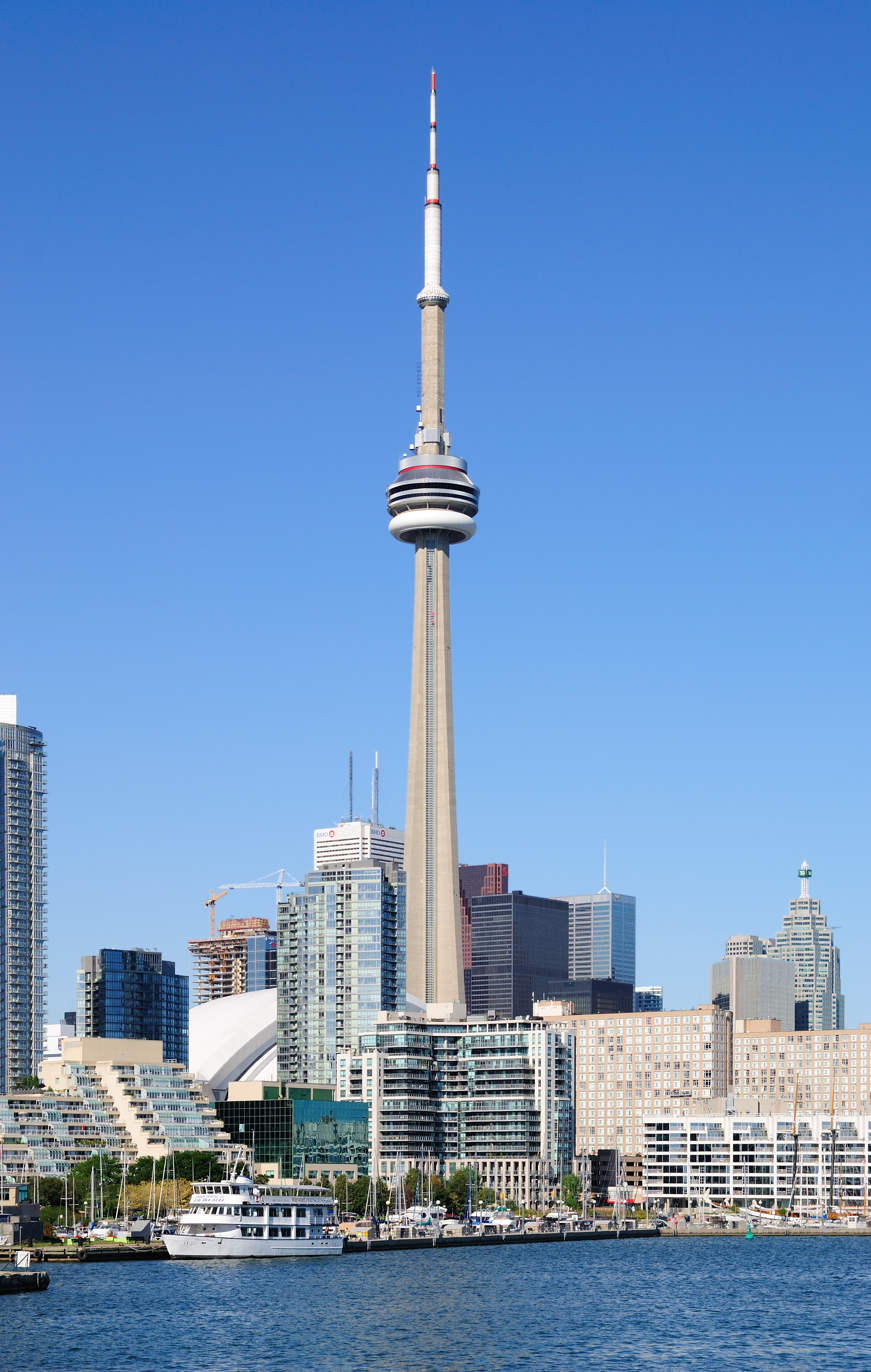
June 26, 1976: The CN Tower, world's tallest free-standing structure, opens in Toronto

The following events occurred in June 1976:

== June 1, 1976 (Tuesday) ==
- All 45 people on Aeroflot Flight 418 were killed in a crash in Africa when the Tu-154 jetliner disappeared shortly after taking off from Malabo in Equatorial Guinea, as the first stop in its flight to Moscow after originating in Angola at Luanda. The wreckage was found on the Equatorial Guinean island of Bioko, where it had crashed into Mount San Carlos.
- The United Kingdom and Iceland came to an agreement on North Atlantic Ocean fishing rights that ended the Cod War. While not completely banning British fishing within 200 miles (320 km) of Iceland's coast, the territorial waters claimed by Iceland, the agreement did reduce the numbers of fishing trawlers in a day to 24 and barred fishing entirely within 30 miles (48 km) of Iceland. The UK did not agree to Iceland's demand to reduce the total amount of cod to no more than 35,000 tons a year.
- Born: Angela Perez Baraquio, American educator who was crowned Miss America 2001 as the first Asian-American to win the pageant; in Honolulu

== June 2, 1976 (Wednesday) ==
- The most comprehensive search made up to that time for the Loch Ness Monster began with underwater photography with motion sensor cameras, sonars and television cameras beneath the surface of the Scottish lake Loch Ness, located in Inverness-shire in the Scottish Highlands. The American expedition, led by Dr. Robert H. Rines of Boston was financed by the U.S. Academy of Applied Science and by The New York Times. After six months, the expedition "failed to turn up new evidence to explain the mysterious and legendary phenomenon"
- A car bomb, planted by mobsters, fatally injured Arizona Republic reporter Don Bolles in Phoenix. Bolles died in a hospital 11 days later on June 13. Bolles, an investigative reporter, had been working on an article about the Mafia infiltration of Arizona's cities and had been invited to a meeting at the Clarendon House Hotel by a towing business owner, John Adamson. While Bolles was in the hotel, the bomb had been placed under the seat of his car, which had been in a parking garage. Phoenix police arrested Adamson soon after Bolles died. Adamson would confess at his trial, seven months later, that he had planted the bomb after being paid $5,800 in cash by a land developer, Max Dunlap, to carry out the crime. In return, Adamson received a sentence of 20 years and 8 months as part of a plea bargain, rather than life imprisonment, with the incarceration to be done outside of the U.S. state of Arizona for Adamson's safety.
- After almost 30 years of independence from the United States, the government of the Philippines opened diplomatic relations with the Soviet Union.
- Born: 'Masenate Mohato Seeiso, queen consort of Lesotho as the wife of King Letsie III; as Anna Karabo Motšoeneng in Mapoteng
- Died:
  - Juan José Torres, 56, former President of Bolivia from 1970 to 1971, was kidnapped and murdered by a right-wing death squad at the Buenos Aires suburb of San Andrés de Giles.
  - Abdul Rahman Hassan Azzam, 79, Egyptian diplomat and, from 1945 to 1952, the first Secretary-General of the Arab League

== June 3, 1976 (Thursday) ==
- One of the four surviving copies of the 761-year-old Magna Carta arrived in Washington, D.C., and was loaned from the United Kingdom to the United States in honor of the U.S. bicentennial celebrations. Led by the British Lord Chancellor, Lord Elwyn-Jones, a delegation presented the document, to the U.S. Speaker of the House, Carl Albert, and a group of Representatives and Senators. The document, the first charter of personal and political liberty made in England and the inspiration to future charters, had been signed by King John at Runnymede on June 15, 1215. Lord Elwyn-Jones commented, "Peoples not familiar with our ways have thought it paradoxical for the British to be joining in the celebration of the Bicentenary of what was, after all, the loss of the American colonies. They overlook our traditions of compromise. We in fact now regard the events of two centuries ago as a victory for the English-speaking world." Although the loan was for only one year, a gold replica of the document, and its massive protective case made of gold and silver, was given to the Capitol for permanent display.
- Died:
  - Jinvijay (Kishansinh Parmar), 88, Indian Jainist faith scholar
  - Viggo Kampmann, 65, Prime Minister of Denmark from 1960 to 1962

== June 4, 1976 (Friday) ==
- The Boston Celtics defeated the Phoenix Suns 128–126 in triple overtime in Game 5 of the NBA Finals at the Boston Garden. In 1997, the game would be selected by a panel of experts as the greatest of the NBA's first 50 years. The game had been tied 95–95 at the end of regulation, then 101-101 and 112-112.
- All 45 people on Air Manila Flight 702 and a truck driver were killed when the Lockheed Electra turboprop crashed on takeoff from Agana at Guam. The aircraft "struck a hill, bounced over a highway and hit a pickup truck" then burst into flame.
- Born: Alexei Navalny, Russian lawyer and politician, jailed opponent of Vladimir Putin and the victim of a poisoning attempt; in Butyn, Moscow Oblast, Russian SFSR

== June 5, 1976 (Saturday) ==
- In the United States, 11 people were killed in the collapse of the Teton Dam in southeast Idaho. At 7:30 in the morning local time, the first leak appeared and became noticeably worse by 9:30 and two crews with bulldozers were sent to plug the leak. The gap gradually got wider and at 11:55, the earthen dam collapsed and released the pent-up waters of the Teton River into the Snake River Plain. Most of the buildings in Wilford, Idaho were destroyed, and the city of Rexburg was flooded for days.
- Seven people in Northern Ireland were killed in terrorist attacks on two different Belfast pubs. An Irish Republican Army bomb exploded in front of the door of the Times Bar, killing two Protestant patrons; in retaliation, the Ulster Volunteer Force sent four gunmen into the Chlorane Bar, who shot and killed five people—three Catholic and two Protestant. In July, the IRA retaliated for the Chlorane Bar shooting by killing three civilians at Walker's Bar, and the UVF responded by killing six people at the Ramble Inn outside of Antrim. In all, at least 16 persons were killed in the retaliation shootings.
- Dwight Stones of Long Beach State University in the U.S. broke his own world record for the high jump, leaping 7 feet, 7 inches (2.31 m) at the NCAA track and field championships in Philadelphia.
- Carl Albert, the Speaker of the U.S. House of Representatives, announced that he would retire from Congress at the end of his current term and that he would not seek re-election as a Congressman from Oklahoma. Newspaper columnist Jack Anderson would later say that Albert, whose office had been accused of accepting gifts from South Korean businessman Tongsun Park, had been pressured to retire by House Majority Leader Tip O'Neill.
- Born:
  - Sonalika Joshi, Indian TV actress known for Taarak Mehta's long-running Hindi language situation comedy Ka Ooltah Chashmah ("Inverted Glasses"); in Mumbai
  - Aesop Rock (stage name for Ian Bavitz), American hip hop recording artist; in Syosset, New York
- Died:
  - María Ruanova, 63, Argentine ballet dancer and choreographer
  - Willy Rösingh, 75, Dutch rower and 1924 Olympic gold medalist

== June 6, 1976 (Sunday) ==
- A plane crash in Kota Kinabalu, Malaysia, killed all 11 people on board, including the recently inaugurated chief minister of Sabah, Tun Fuad Stephens, and three of his ministers.
- The Boston Celtics won the NBA Championship, defeating the host Phoenix Suns, 87 to 80, to take the four-game series 4 games to 2.
- Switzerland's most infamous murder was discovered in the town of Seewen in the canton of Solothurn, with bodies of five victims in the family of 80-year-old Anna Westhäuser-Siegrist. The other people killed were Anna's brother Eugen, her sister-in-law Elsa, and her two sons Emanuel and Max, all five shot with a Winchester rifle. The killer would never be found and the statute of limitations for charging anyone with the crime would expire 30 years later.
- Born: Geoff Rowley, English professional skateboarder, co-founder of the Flip Skateboards company and Thrasher magazine Skater of the Year in 2000; in Liverpool
- Died:
  - J. Paul Getty, 83, American oil industry billionaire and one of the world's wealthiest men at the time.
  - Elisabeth Rethberg, 81, German-born American opera soprano
  - David Jacobs, Welsh track and field sprinter and Olympic gold medalist
  - Victor Varconi (stage name for Mihaly Varkonyi), 85, Hungarian-born American silent film actor

== June 7, 1976 (Monday) ==
- In Asunción, the capital of Paraguay, a Croatian nationalist attempted to assassinate Yugoslavian Ambassador Mancillo Vucekovic, but mistakenly wounded Uruguay's Ambassador, Carlos Abdala in a case of mistaken identity.
- The McDonald's hamburger restaurant chain opened its first New Zealand franchise, located in Porirua, a suburb of Wellington.
- Born: Necro (stage name for Ron Braunstein), American rap artist; in Brooklyn
- Died:
  - Shigetarō Shimada, 92, convicted Japanese war criminal for his actions as Admiral of the Imperial Navy and as Japan's Minister of the Navy during World War II. Shimada was sentenced to life imprisonment in 1945 but paroled in 1955 after the end of the U.S. occupation.
  - Bobby Hackett, 61, American jazz musician

== June 8, 1976 (Tuesday) ==
- The final presidential primaries for the 1976 U.S. presidential election were conducted, with voting in the states of California, Ohio and New Jersey. Former Georgia Governor Jimmy Carter won the Ohio Democratic primary and gained more than 200 delegate votes overall, putting him within 400 votes of the nomination. Carter estimated that he had at least 1,250 of the necessary 1,505 delegates needed for a win on the first ballot and received endorsements from several prominent Democrats the next day, in what The New York Times described as "capping one of the most brilliantly plotted nominations in American political history." In the race for the Republican Party nomination, incumbent U.S. President Gerald Ford had a narrow lead of 105 delegates over former California Governor Ronald Reagan, although the outcome of the nomination depended on "a six-week battle through 11 state conventions."
- The Parole Board of the U.S. state of Nebraska voted, 4 to 1, to release 32-year-old Caril Ann Fugate from prison after she had served almost 18 years in prison for assisting her boyfriend, Charles Starkweather in the murder of 11 people in 1958. Fugate had been 14 years old when she accompanied Starkweather on a murder rampage in Nebraska and Wyoming, and was convicted of first degree murder. Starkweather had been put to death in the electric chair. Fugate was released from the Nebraska Center for Women, in York, Nebraska, on June 20.
- Born: Lindsay Davenport, American professional tennis player, ranked #1 for the WTA and winner of the women's singles at the U.S. Open, French Open and Australian Open between 1998 and 2000; in Palos Verdes, California

== June 9, 1976 (Wednesday) ==
- The Kingdom of Spain approved the legalization of political parties for the first time since 1939, when the government of General Francisco Franco had entered a ban to opposition groups after his victory in the Spanish Civil War. The measure was approved by a 338 to 91 majority of the members present in the 561-member Cortes, Spain's parliament, with 24 abstentions and 108 members choosing not to attend the session.
- Former Georgia Governor Jimmy Carter received the endorsements of two of his former opponents in the race for the Democratic Party nomination for the 1976 U.S. presidential race, with Alabama Governor George C. Wallace and U.S. Senator Henry M. Jackson pledging their delegates, and Chicago Mayor Richard J. Daley giving his endorsement. The three endorsements were seen as certain to give Carter (who already had at least 1,135 delegates) more than the 1,505 votes needed for the nomination. The prospects for U.S. President Gerald Ford to be nominated as the Republican candidate were less certain, in that he had only a slight (105 delegates) lead over his challenger, former California Governor Ronald Reagan, with Republican conventions in 11 states still to be held over the next six weeks.
- The Labour Party government of British Prime Minister James Callaghan survived a no confidence motion brought by the Conservative Party and Leader of the Opposition Margaret Thatcher, with 290 voting in favor of the motion and 309 against.
- Born: Bruno Sroka, French kitesurfer and three-time World Cup winner; in Clamart
- Died
  - Dame Sybil Thorndike, 93, described in her obituary as "the pre-eminent actress of the British theater"
  - Sayed el-Ouali, 28, Saharan Arab leader and Secretary-General or the Polisario Front, was killed by Mauritanian Army troops in a battle near Nouakchott, the capital of Mauritania, which had annexed the lower one-third of the former Spanish Sahara. On June 30, the Polisario Front announced the selection of Mahmoud Larussi as the new leader.
  - William King Harvey, 60, American CIA officer known for his participation in various Operation Mongoose missions for attempted overthrows of other nations' governments
  - Jan Nagórski, 88, Polish aviator who was the first person to fly an airplane in the Arctic
  - James A. Farley, 88, American politician and Democratic Party power broker
  - Lucian Ercolani, 88, Italian furniture designer and manufacturer known for the Ercol line of products

== June 10, 1976 (Thursday) ==
- Uganda's President Idi Amin Dada escaped assassination when a grenade was thrown into his jeep as he was leaving a graduation ceremony for new graduates of the Ugandan police barracks at Nsambya. General Amin had arrived at the barracks in a jeep driven by his chauffeur, Staff Sergeant Moses Abbas, and normally would have been sitting in the passenger seat, where the grenade landed; but Amin had decided to drive when the two departed the barracks. Abbas had moved over to the passenger seat and was killed when the grenade landed on his side. According to other reports at least eight people were killed by gunfire that occurred as Amin was driving off to the Mulago hospital.
- A list of the names and addresses of thousands of political refugees in Argentina, maintained by the Catholic International Migrations Committee, was stolen in Buenos Aires when a group of 10 armed men broke into the Committee in headquarters and confiscated records, prompting fears of massive government arrests and disappearances of dissidents. The next day, armed men marched into two Buenos Aires hotels and made 24 arrests.
- Indian opposition leader George Fernandes, accused of having been the mastermind of the "Baroda dynamite case", was arrested in Calcutta almost three months after the first arrests had been made.
- The United States launched Marisat 2, the second of its series of geosynchronous maritime communications satellites to aid navigation for ships at sea, and stationed it at the 176th meridian east over the Equator near the Gilbert Islands in the Pacific Ocean.
- Born: Mariana Seoane, Mexican TV actress and telenovela star; in Mexico City
- Died: Adolph Zukor, 103, American film producer who created the Paramount Pictures Corporation

== June 11, 1976 (Friday) ==
- The anti-Castro terrorist group Coordination of United Revolutionary Organizations, CORU (Coordinación de Organizaciones Revolutionarias Unidas), was created by two Cuban exiles, Dr. Orlando Bosch and former CIA agent Luis Posada Carriles at a meeting in the Dominican Republic resort of Bonao. According to an FBI internal memo written August 16, 1978, five anti-Castro groups... united in the Dominican Republic on June 11, 1976.... Accion Cubana, Cuban Nationalist Movement, Cuban National Liberation Front, Association of the Veterans of the Bay of Pigs Brigate 2506 and the 17th of April Movement." CORU's first terrorist act would be the bombing of Cubana de Aviación Flight 455 on October 6, 1976, killing all 73 people on board.
- Political candidate Robert A. Dufala, who had lost a race on June 8 in the primary election for the Republican nomination for U.S. Representative of New Jersey's 2nd congressional district, was arrested by undercover agents of the U.S. Secret Service, on charges that he was planning the July 4 assassination of U.S. Vice President Nelson Rockefeller with a cyanide laced bullet. After a jury was unable to reach a verdict on March 11, 1977, Dufala would plead guilty on September 7, 1977.
- The blockbuster film Gone with the Wind was shown on U.S. television for the first time at 2:30 in the afternoon Eastern time, after the Home Box Office pay television network purchased the rights to telecast it on non-broadcast television for 14 commercial-free and unedited showings on seven separate days (June 11, 13, 15, 18, 24, 26 and 28).
- Prince Philip, Duke of Edinburgh gathers 126 of the UK's leading engineers at Buckingham Palace to form the Fellowship of Engineering, later to be known as the UK's Royal Academy of Engineering.
- Died: Joseph "Toots" Mondt, 82, American wrestler and promoter whose development of "Slam Bang Western Style Wrestling" in 1919 combined elements of wrestling, costuming and showmanship as entertainment later billed as "professional wrestling", and who teamed with Vince McMahon Sr. to create the Capitol Wrestling Corporation in 1953, later renamed the World Wide Wrestling Federation, World Wrestling Federation and now World Wrestling Entertainment, Inc.

== June 12, 1976 (Saturday) ==
- Juan María Bordaberry, the President of Uruguay since 1971, was deposed by the Uruguayan armed forces in Montevideo. Bordaberry won a close election, but a coup d'état in 1973 reduced his power to being the nominal president in a "civil-military administration". He was replaced by his vice-president, Alberto Demicheli, until an electoral college could be formed from military officers and civilian members of the Council of State to select a permanent president.
- Born:
  - Tae Satoya, Japanese skier and 1998 Winter Olympics gold medalist in the women's freestyle skiing competition; in Sapporo
  - Thomas Sørensen, Danish soccer football goalkeeper with 101 games for the national team over 13 seasons; in Fredericia
  - Myo Minn Soe, Burmese fashion designer; in Mandalay
  - Youssef Rakha, Egyptian writer; in Dokki
- Died: Ilya Kopalin, 75, Soviet Russian documentary filmmaker

== June 13, 1976 (Sunday) ==
- Texas Instruments released the first electronic educational toy, the "Little Professor", which would provide random arithmetic problems to children with an adjustable level of difficulty.
- Savage thunderstorms rolled through the state of Iowa, spawning several tornadoes, including an F-5 tornado that destroyed the town of Jordan, Iowa.
- Died: Don Bolles, 47, U.S. investigative reporter from injuries incurred from June 2 car bombing

== June 14, 1976 (Monday) ==
- Near Acapulco in Mexico, 17 people were killed and 40 injured when the bus they were on swerved to avoid a head-on collision with another bus, skidded off of a highway and fell into a ravine.
- The Gong Show a creation of game show producer Chuck Barris as an amateur talent show with both legitimate and ridiculous competitors, premiered on the NBC television network as a daytime program. Running for two seasons on the NBC network, and in syndication for two more years, the show was hosted by Barris and featured three celebrity panelists judging the acts, any of whom could hit an oversized gong to stop an act. The show's format was a precursor to shows such as America's Got Talent in 2006.
- The trial of Donald Neilson, a serial killer referred to in the British press as the Black Panther, began at the Oxford Crown Court for the first of four counts of murder. He would be convicted of the murder of Lesley Whittle on July 1, 1976, and three other murders later in the month.
- Born:
  - Alan Carr, English comedian; in Weymouth, Dorset
  - Park Hae-joon, South Korean TV actor, star of The World of the Married; in Busan
- Died:
  - Knud, Hereditary Prince of Denmark, 75, younger brother of King Christian X and heir presumptive to the throne of Denmark from 1947 until March 27, 1953, when the Act of Succession was approved by voters to allow women to inherit the throne, allowing King Christian's daughter to succeed him in 1972 as Queen Margrethe II.
  - General Heinrich Kreipe, 81 German Wehrmacht officer who was kidnapped from Crete in 1944 during World War II and a prisoner of war in Britain until 1947.
  - Géza Anda, 54, Hungarian musician, from cancer

== June 15, 1976 (Tuesday) ==
- The government of the People's Republic of China announced that Communist Party Chairman Mao Zedong was no longer receiving foreign visitors, prompting speculation that he was terminally ill.
- Born: Khin Zarchi Kyaw, Burmese film actress, 2002 Myanmar Motion Picture Academy Award winner; in Rangoon, Burma (now Yangon, Myanmar)
- Died: H. T. Friis, 83, Danish-born radio engineer and inventor for whom the Friis transmission equation and the Friis formulas for noise are named.

== June 16, 1976 (Wednesday) ==
- The Soweto uprising, a protest by black African schoolchildren and adults against a regulation requiring the teaching of classes in the Afrikaans language and barring the use of the Zulu language, began in the black African slum district near Johannesburg known as the South West Township in South Africa, with six deaths on the first day of student protests. At the time, Soweto's schools were "open only to those who can afford books and uniforms", and a group of 100 of the older students had assembled the day before to plan the protest march against the mandatory use of Afrikaans for teaching mathematics and science. Wearing their school uniforms, the students gathered at the school with picket signs the next morning and at 7:30 began marching to a nearby stadium in the Orlando East neighborhood. The death toll after the riot ended was 178 people killed, including 12 children and two white bystanders; and 1,139 injured. On July 6, South Africa's Education Minister Michiel C. Botha announced that his government agreed to rescind the regulation requiring mandatory instruction in Afrikaans.
- Terrorists in Beirut kidnapped and murdered Francis E. Meloy Jr., the newly appointed U.S. Ambassador to Lebanon, along with his economic adviser, Robert O. Waring, and the Embassy's Lebanese chauffeur, Zoheir Moghrabi.
- Panamanian-born jockey Jorge Tejeira set a record by winning eight horse races in a single day, finishing in first place three times at the Keystone Racetrack in Bensalem, Pennsylvania, then five more times at the Atlantic City Race Course in Mays Landing, New Jersey.
- The character of "Victor Lord", featured on almost every episode of the U.S. soap opera One Life to Live, was written out of the series by having him die in a hospital after having a stroke. In 2003, the storyline of the TV series would feature a twist of Victor turning out, almost 27 years later, to have been alive all along and planning a bizarre scheme involving killing his granddaughter to receive a heart transplant, ending with Victor dying a second time on the show.
- Born: Tom Lenk, American TV actor; in Camarillo, California
- Died: Hector Pieterson, 12, South African schoolboy, shot by police during the Soweto uprising. The photograph of his body being carried sparked worldwide outrage against South Africa's apartheid government.

== June 17, 1976 (Thursday) ==
- The National Basketball Association and the American Basketball Association agreed to the ABA–NBA merger, with four ABA teams (the Denver Nuggets, the Indiana Pacers, the New York Nets and the San Antonio Spurs) being admitted to the NBA.
- The Court of Appeals, highest court in the U.S. state of New York, voided the state's blue laws prohibiting the sale of most items on Sundays. The ban had been in existence since 1656, when implemented by the Dutch colony of the New Netherlands, but was voided after 320 years as unconstitutional, in a unanimous decision. The Court declared that parts of the statue were rarely enforced by police and routinely disregarded by thousands of businesses", rendering them "constitutionally defective". Prior to that time, the discount stores and supermarkets had been making sales anyway without consequence. At the time, blue laws were still in effect in 30 of the 50 states of the U.S.
- Born:
  - Pyotr Svidler, Russian chess grandmaster and Russian national champion; in Leningrad
  - Scott Adkins, English action film star; in Sutton Coldfield, West Midlands
- Died:
  - Lord Casey, 85, Governor-General of Australia from 1965 to 1969
  - Francisco "Paco" Urondo, 46, Argentine novelist who had become a member of the Montoneros guerillas, was shot to death in an ambush by the Argentine Federal Police in Mendoza.

== June 18, 1976 (Friday) ==
- Flooding in Bangladesh killed at least 143 people after torrential monsoon rains caused landslides and led to rivers overflowing their banks.
- NASA launched Gravity Probe A, the first attempt to measure with high precision the rate at which time passes in a weaker gravitational field in a test of the equivalence principle postulated by Albert Einstein. The probe was launched to a height of 10,000 kilometres (6,200 mi) above the Earth and remained in space for 1 hour and 55 minutes. Its measurements confirmed Einstein's prediction of the flow of time being slowed by a predictable rate in relation to gravity.
- Born:
  - Blake Shelton, American country music singer; in Ada, Oklahoma
  - Alana de la Garza, American actress, in Columbus, Ohio
  - Brady Haran, Australian-born educational video producer; in Glenelg, South Australia
  - Tatsuhiko Kubo, Japanese soccer football forward and national team member 1998 to 2006; in Chikuzen, Fukuoka
  - Akinori Nishizawa, Japanese soccer football forward and national team member 1997 to 2002; in Shizuoka

== June 19, 1976 (Saturday) ==
- King Carl XVI Gustaf of Sweden married Silvia Renate Sommerlath of West Germany in a ceremony in Stockholm. Roughly 150,000 Swedes watched the wedding procession.
- Viking 1, the U.S. probe to Mars, entered into orbit around the red planet 10 months after its launch.
- Born: Ryan Hurst, American TV actor known for The Walking Dead; in Santa Monica, California
- Died: Desmond 'Dizzy' de Villiers, 53, British test pilot who, on March 5, 1956, had been the first person to (inadvertently) break the speed of sound while in an open cockpit. His death was from natural causes.

== June 20, 1976 (Sunday) ==
- Two days of parliamentary elections began in Italy after the fall of the government of Prime Minister Aldo Moro. While the Italian Communist Party (PCI) gained 49 seats and Moro's Democrazia Cristiana (DC) lost four in the 630-member Chamber of Deputies, the DC still had a plurality of 262 seats against the PCI's 228. Democrazia Cristiana maintained 135 seats in the 315-member Italian Senate while the PCI had 116. Giulio Andreotti of the DC was able to form a government more than a month later as the new Prime Minister of Italy, with DC deputies as Ministers and a pledge of support, but not direct participation, by PCI.
- Voting was held in Northern Cyprus for the breakaway republic's first elected president and for the 40-member Assembly of the Republic (Cumhuriyet Meclisi). Rauf Denktaş, who had proclaimed the Turkish Federated State of Cyprus on February 13, 1975, after the Cyprus Civil War had increased the animosity between the Turkish-speaking residents on the north part of the island and the Greek-speaking residents of the south.
- Czechoslovakia defeated West Germany, 5 to 3, on penalty shots to win Euro 76, following a 2 to 2 tie after extra time. After his team took a 4 to 3 lead on penalties, Czech midfielder Antonín Panenka provided the winning kick by introducing a new style that now bears his name, the "panenka", faking a shot to the corner of the goal and then tapping the ball straight ahead when goalkeeper Sepp Maier dived. The match was played before a crowd of 30,790 at Red Star Stadium in Belgrade in Yugoslavia.
- The United States quietly, and without ceremony, completed its withdrawal of troops from Thailand and closed the last two military installations that it had maintained there. During the Vietnam War, Ramasun Station had housed an electronic monitoring facility near Udon Thani, while the U-Tapao Royal Thai Navy Airfield had been the staging center for B-52 bombers to fly bombing missions in Cambodia and Vietnam. By agreement made on March 20, the U.S. was required to withdraw all remaining military personnel from Thailand except for 270 military advisers.
- Hundreds of Western residents and tourists in Lebanon were moved from Beirut by boat, after U.S. President Ford concluded that an evacuation of citizens by a convoy of buses to Syria would be too risky. A group of 263 Americans and non-Lebanese residents boarded U.S. Navy transports that took them to the USS Spiegel Grove for a 40-hour journey to Athens on the Mediterranean Sea.

== June 21, 1976 (Monday) ==
- The "four color theorem", a mathematical conjecture that no more than four colors are required to color the regions of any map so that no two adjacent regions have the same color, was announced as proven 123 years after it had first been proposed by brothers Francis Guthrie and Frederick Guthrie, and mathematician Augustus De Morgan. Two mathematicians at the University of Illinois, Wolfgang Haken and Kenneth Appel, announced in Champaign, Illinois that they had used a computer analysis to prove the theorem, first proposed in 1852 and described in the British academic magazine The Athenaeum in 1854. Haken had been working on solving the problem since 1951, and Appel had teamed up with him in 1974.
- An Arab League peacekeeping force of 1,000 troops from Syria and Libya arrived in Beirut as a ceasefire went into effect.
- Died: Barbara Robb, 64, British psychotherapist and advocate for the rights of the elderly in nursing homes and psychiatric wards, who had founded AEGIS, Aid for the Elderly in Government Institutions, in 1965.

== June 22, 1976 (Tuesday) ==
- The Salyut 5 space station was launched into orbit by the Soviet Union, in advance of the Soyuz 21 mission launched on July 6 with two cosmonauts, Boris Volynov and Vitali Zholobov.
- Born: Mike O'Brien, American TV comedian and producer; in Blissfield, Michigan

== June 23, 1976 (Wednesday) ==
- In the UN Security Council, the United States vetoed the entry of Angola into the United Nations.
- The oil barge NEPCO 140 spilled 250,000 U.S. gallons (almost 950,000 liters) of fuel oil into the St. Lawrence Seaway after running aground near Alexandria Bay, New York and rupturing three of its 16 storage tanks.
- American mob leader Anthony Provenzano, nicknamed "Tony Pro", was indicted in the Ulster County Court in Kingston, New York, on state charges of conspiracy and murder for the death (in 1961) of Teamsters official Anthony Castellito on June 4, 1961 Provenzano, already under indictment on federal charges of racketeering, would be convicted of the murder charge on June 14, 1978, and sentenced to life in prison.
- Born: Patrick Vieira, Senegal-born French professional soccer football midfielder on the France national team, manager for New York City FC, Nice and Crystal Palace; in Dakar, Senegal
- Died:
  - Lon Warneke, 67, American baseball pitcher with the best ERA in 1932
  - Imogen Cunningham, 93, award-winning American photographer

== June 24, 1976 (Thursday) ==
- Poland's Prime Minister Piotr Jaroszewicz announced that effective June 27, the nation's Communist government would end its five-year-old policy of food price freeze, implemented after the events of December 1970. Jaroszewicz informed a gathering at the Sejm, that on Sunday the price of sugar was to double overnight, along with a 69% increase in the price of meat and 30% for butter and cheese. In order to prevent hoarding, the Prime Minister said, state stores would limit sales on Friday and Saturday, and cash compensations to wage earners, students, pensioners and low-income groups.
- Manila was formally restored to its status at the capital of the Philippines by Ferdinand Marcos with the issuance of Presidential Decree 940, replacing nearby Quezon City, which had been made the capital on October 12, 1949.
- ABC News commentator Howard K. Smith revealed that U.S. President Lyndon Johnson had told him, during a White House visit, that the assassination of John F. Kennedy had been instigated by Cuban premier Fidel Castro. Smith wrote a thorough note of the conversation after leaving the White House, and recalled that Johnson had said "I'll tell you something that will rock you. Kennedy was trying to get Castro, but Castro got to him first." Smith told a television audience, "I was rocked all right. I begged for details. He refused, saying 'it will all come out one day.'" Smith added that "Mr. Johnson often dealt in blarney; and what he told me may have been that." He added that he had decided to make the conversation public because the U.S. Congress had recently discussed making its own investigation of the assassination.
- Born:
  - Sameera Aziz, Saudi Arabian film director and businesswoman; in Khobar
  - Gabriel Felbermayr, Austrian economist, in Steyr
  - Alika Kinan, Argentine civil rights activist; in Córdoba
  - David Bagration, Spanish businessman and a pretender to the throne of the abolished monarchy of Georgia as a descendant of King George XII; in Madrid
- Died:
  - Juliette Elmir, 66 or 67, Lebanese-Argentine nurse and political activist.
  - General Liu Wenhui, 80, Communist Chinese government minister who had switched his allegiance from Chiang Kai-shek to Mao Zedong.
  - Domenico Mallardo, Italian organized crime leader in the Campania region and leader of Mallardo clan crime family, was killed by the rival Maisto clan, beginning a bitter gang war between the Mallardo and Maisto crime families.

== June 25, 1976 (Friday) ==
- After the Communist government of Poland announced a rise in food prices, it quickly reversed its decision after strikes began in the Warsaw suburb of Ursus and in the cities of Radom, and Płock. The government reversed the price hike and the workers returned to their jobs on June 30.
- Uganda's President Idi Amin announced that he had been proclaimed "President for Life" by the Advisory Defence Council that he had created to counsel him on national decisions. Amin, who had survived an assassination attempt earlier in the month, said that "My driver was killed and so was my escort. Only I escaped. I was saved from death by God's wish. I will not die and I will not fear anybody. If I am going to die, God will tell me."
- In the U.S. state of Missouri, Governor Christopher "Kit" Bond signed an executive order formally rescinding an order that had been issued in 1838 by then-Governor Lilburn Boggs directing the state militia to deport, and if resistance was encountered, to kill Mormon believers in the state. Executive Order 44, remembered as the "Mormon Extermination Order", had been issued by Governor Boggs on October 27, 1838, directed General John B. Clark that "The Mormons must be treated as enemies, and must be exterminated or driven from the state if necessary for the public peace—their outrages are beyond all description." Governor Bond said in a statement, "This was a dark chapter in Missouri's history. In this, our country's 200th birthday, it is fitting to reaffirm our belief in the principles which our founding fathers recognized in our state and the nation's Constitution and Bill of Rights."
- Texas Rangers baseball shortstop Toby Harrah set a record for "doing nothing" in a doubleheader against the visiting Chicago White Sox, without having the ball hit in his direction at all.
- Born: Neil Walker, American swimmer, 2000 and 2004 Olympic gold medalist; in Verona, Wisconsin
- Died: Johnny Mercer, 66, American lyricist for multiple hit songs, including "Moon River", "You Must Have Been a Beautiful Baby", "On the Atchison, Topeka and the Santa Fe" and "Jeepers, Creepers!"

== June 26, 1976 (Saturday) ==
- A 7.1 magnitude earthquake and subsequent landslides killed at least 9,000 people in Indonesia's province of West Irian. The quake was detected at 4:18 in the morning local time (19:18 UTC 25 June), but requests for aid did not reach the West until two weeks later with reports that the disaster may have killed 9,000 people and destroyed 17 villages in the Jawawijaya Mountains.
- In Toronto, the CN Tower opened to the public at one minute after midnight. At a height of 1,185.417 feet (361.315 m), the tower was, at the time, the tallest free-standing structure and would hold the record until 2007. It was named for the Canadian National Railway, which had started construction in 1972.
- WBC middleweight boxing champion Rodrigo Valdéz of Colombia lost to WBA champion Carlos Monzón of Argentina in a unification bout in Monte Carlo, in part because Valdéz's brother had been murdered the week before in a barroom fight.
- In an unusual exhibition bout in Tokyo, a precursor to mixed martial arts competition, world heavyweight boxing champion Muhammad Ali fought New Japan Pro-Wrestling heavyweight champion Kanji "Antonio" Inoki. Under the special rules, Inoki was allowed to hit below the belt and to kick Ali. Reportedly, an estimated 1.4 billion people worldwide watched the bout on television. After 15 rounds, viewers and critics were upset when the match was declared to be a draw with no winner.
- The first of 16 "tall ships" arrived in U.S. waters in order to participate in the upcoming Grand Parade of Sailing Ships set for the U.S. bicentennial celebration set for July 4, 1976 in New York's harbor. The Argentine ship ARA Libertad, rigged in the tradition of an 18th Century fully-rigged sailing ship (but powered by motors), arrived in the harbor at Newport, Rhode Island with a crew of Argentine Navy cadets dressed as sailors of the time.
- Plans for the Viking I spacecraft to land on Mars on July the 4th were postponed by NASA and the Jet Propulsion Laboratory after the original landing site at Chryse Planitia was found to be "more cratered and rough than previously known."
- Born: Alexander Zakharchenko, Ukrainian separatist leader who proclaimed the "Donetsk People's Republic" in 2014; in Donetsk, Ukrainian SSR, Soviet Union (assassinated 2018)

== June 27, 1976 (Sunday) ==
- Palestinian militants hijacked Air France Flight 139 after it took off from Athens with 245 passengers and 12 crew, then landed at the Entebbe Airport in Uganda with the permission of Ugandan dictator Idi Amin Dada. The Airbus A300 jumbo jet had departed Tel Aviv on a flight to Paris, with a stop in Greece, where six hijackers boarded, then commandeered the flight to land in Benghazi in Libya for refueling before flying on to Entebbe.
- In the first popular vote presidential election in Portugal in 18 years, a majority of voters cast their ballots for General António Ramalho Eanes, who had the support of Portugal's three largest non-Communist political parties.
- The first known case of the Ebola virus began when "Y.G.", a cotton factory worker in Nzara in southern Sudan In Africa, became ill with a high fever, headache and chest pains. He was admitted to the Nzara Hospital on June 30, and two days later began internal bleeding, and died on July 6 as the first casualty of Ebola. Ultimately, 151 people would die in Sudan and a more severe outbreak would start in the central African nation of Zaire in August.
- The "Group of Seven" Western industrial nations (G-7), met for an economic summit in Dorado Beach, Puerto Rico, with U.S. President Gerald Ford welcoming President Valery Giscard d'Estaing of France, West Germany's Chancellor Helmut Schmidt, and the Prime Ministers of the United Kingdom (James Callaghan), Japan (Takeo Miki), Italy (Aldo Moro) and Canada (Pierre Trudeau). The Group of Six had added Canada after the 1975 summit in November 1975 in France.
- Born: Joseph Sikora, American TV actor; in Chicago
- Died: C. Wade McClusky, 74, U.S. Navy aviator and hero of the Battle of Midway

== June 28, 1976 (Monday) ==
- The United States Air Force Academy admitted women as students for the first time, as 155 of the 1,600 freshmen of the class of 1980 enrolled at the service academy at Colorado Springs, Colorado. The group were the first females to enroll at an American military academy, one week before women were to start at the U.S. Military Academy at West Point, New York and the U.S. Naval Academy at Annapolis, Maryland.
- In a trial of foreign mercenary soldiers who had fought in the Angolan Civil War, the People's Revolutionary Tribunal of Angola found three American and ten Britons guilty of war crimes, meting out jail terms of 16 to 30 years for nine of them. The tribunal recommended execution by firing squad for one soldier from the U.S. (Daniel Gearhart) and three from the UK (John Derek Barker, Andrew McKenzie and Tony Callan (Costas Georgiu). The death sentence was carried out 12 days later on July 10, with all four being executed.
- High winds destroyed the largest U.S. flag made up to that time, ruining plans to display the banner from the Verrazzano–Narrows Bridge in New York City to celebrate the American bicentennial on July 4. A test hanging of the banner, 193 feet (59 m) tall and 366 feet (112 m) long, was made at 9:30 in the morning and the flag stayed aloft for two hours. At 11:30, the wind speed increased to 16 miles per hour (26 km/h), causing the flags to be pushed into the bridge's vertical suspension cables and tore the stitching apart. The flag manufacturer said later, "We didn't think it would need air slots, so we didn't put them in."
- Born:
  - David Palmer, Australian professional squash player, world champion in 2002 and 2006, ranked number one in the world in 2001; in Lithgow, New South Wales
  - Seth Wescott, American snowboarder, Olympic gold medalist in snowboard cross competition in 2006 and 2010; in Durham, North Carolina
  - Nawaf Al-Temyat, Saudi Arabian soccer football midfielder and sports administrator; in Riyadh
  - Satam al-Suqami, Saudi hijacker of American Airlines Flight 11; in Riyadh
- Died: Stanley Baker, 48, Welsh film and television star, died from lung cancer

== June 29, 1976 (Tuesday) ==
The Seychelles' first flag

- The Republic of Seychelles, consisting of 92 islands in the Indian Ocean, was granted independence at 12:05 a.m. from the United Kingdom, in ceremonies held at the capital city of Victoria on the island of Mahé. The UK was represented by Prince Richard, Duke of Gloucester, a first cousin of Queen Elizabeth II. Prime Minister James Mancham took office as the first president, and France-Albert René becoming the first prime minister. Mancham would be overthrown in a coup d'état less than a year later, and René would be installed as his successor.
- The almost 10,000 foot long Songpu Bridge over the Huangpu River opened in Shanghai in China. The bridge measures 9,998.69 feet (3,047.60 m) in length.
- The Organization of Iranian People's Fedai Guerrillas (OIPFG), an underground guerrilla organization in Iran that had conducted an ongoing campaign against the government of the Shah since 1963, had most of its leaders captured when the SAVAK secret police raided the safe house where they had been hiding. Hamid Ashraf, the OIPFG chairman, was killed in the raid and other members were arrested.
- Born:
  - Ma Yili, Chinese actress; in Hongkou, Shanghai

== June 30, 1976 (Wednesday) ==
- The two-day Conference of Communist and Workers Parties of Europe came to an end in East Berlin with Communist leaders from 29 nations winning the okay from Soviet Communist Party leader Leonid Brezhnev for each Communist nation some autonomy in charting its own course. At the end of the conference, the conference produced a document, cleared with the Soviet Union Communist Party as a compromise with its satellite nations, endorsing the right of each of the parties to "develop their internationalist, comradely and voluntary cooperation and solidarity on the basis of the great ideas of Marx, Engels and Lenin" and, to that end, pledging to honor "the principles and equality and sovereign independence of each party, noninterference in internal affairs and respect for their free choice of different roads in the struggle for social change of a progressive nature and for Socialism."
- In Uganda, the hijackers of Air France Flight 139 freed 47 of their 257 hostages, including mothers, children, elderly people, and ailing people. The other 210, including all 70 Israeli citizens on board and the entire 12-member crew, remained captive.
- The Arms Export Control Act, granting the U.S. president authority to control the import and export of military weapons and equipment, was signed into law by U.S. President Ford.
- A freighter from the Soviet Union, the Dekabrist, rescued American balloonist Karl Thomas, whose attempt to fly across the Atlantic Ocean in his "Spirit of '76" hot air balloon had been ended by a thunderstorm. On June 25, Thomas had departed from Lakehurst, New Jersey, with plans to fly to Paris, but ran into a storm the next day. He had thrown a life raft from the balloon as it was losing altitude, and jumped from the gondola from 200 feet (61 m) above the ocean, fracturing several ribs and sustaining some internal bleeding in one of his lungs.
- Died:
  - Shad Polier, 70, American civil rights lawyer
  - Gustav Knittel, 61, German SS Commander and convicted war criminal who served eight years imprisonment for his participation in the Malmedy massacre of 84 American prisoners of war on December 17, 1944.
  - Federico Romero, 89, Spanish zarzuela poet
  - Waring Cuney, 70, American Harlem Renaissance poet
