= Butyn =

Butyn may refer to:

- Butyn, Russia
- Butyn, Ukraine
