= June 1976 (disambiguation) =

June 1976 may refer to:

- June 1976, the month
- June 1976 (album) by the Grateful Dead
- June 1976 protests in Poland
