= May 1976 =

Month of 1976

<<	May 1976					>>
Su	Mo	Tu	We	Th	Fr	Sa
						1
2	3	4	5	6	7	8
9	10	11	12	13	14	15
16	17	18	19	20	21	22
23	24	25	26	27	28	29
30	31

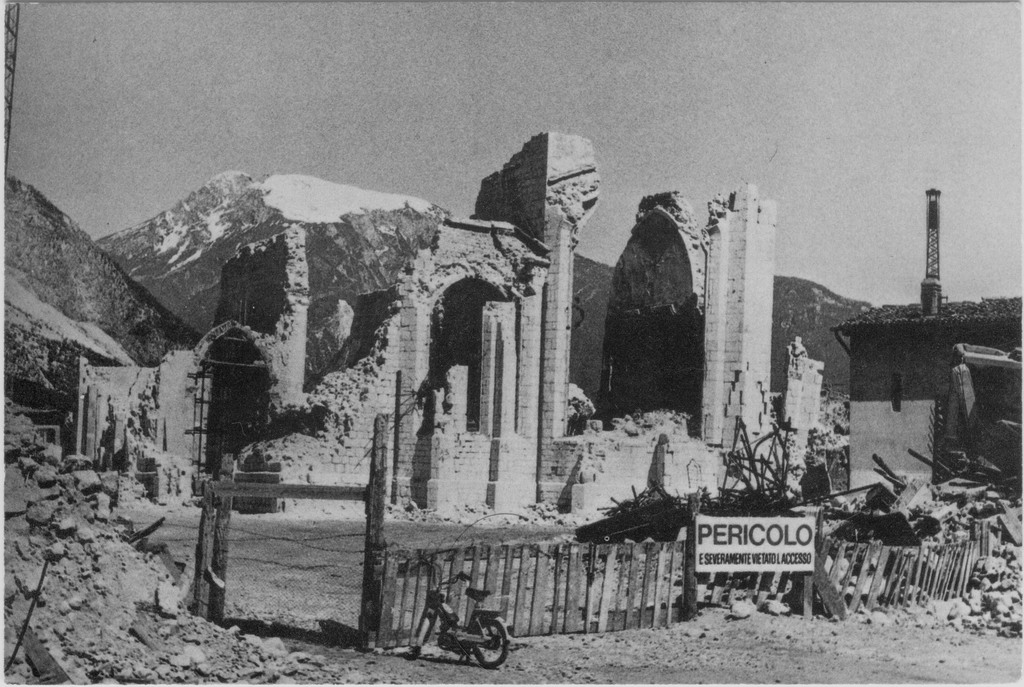
May 6, 1976: Earthquake in Italy kills 978 people (pictured: damage in Venzone from the quake)

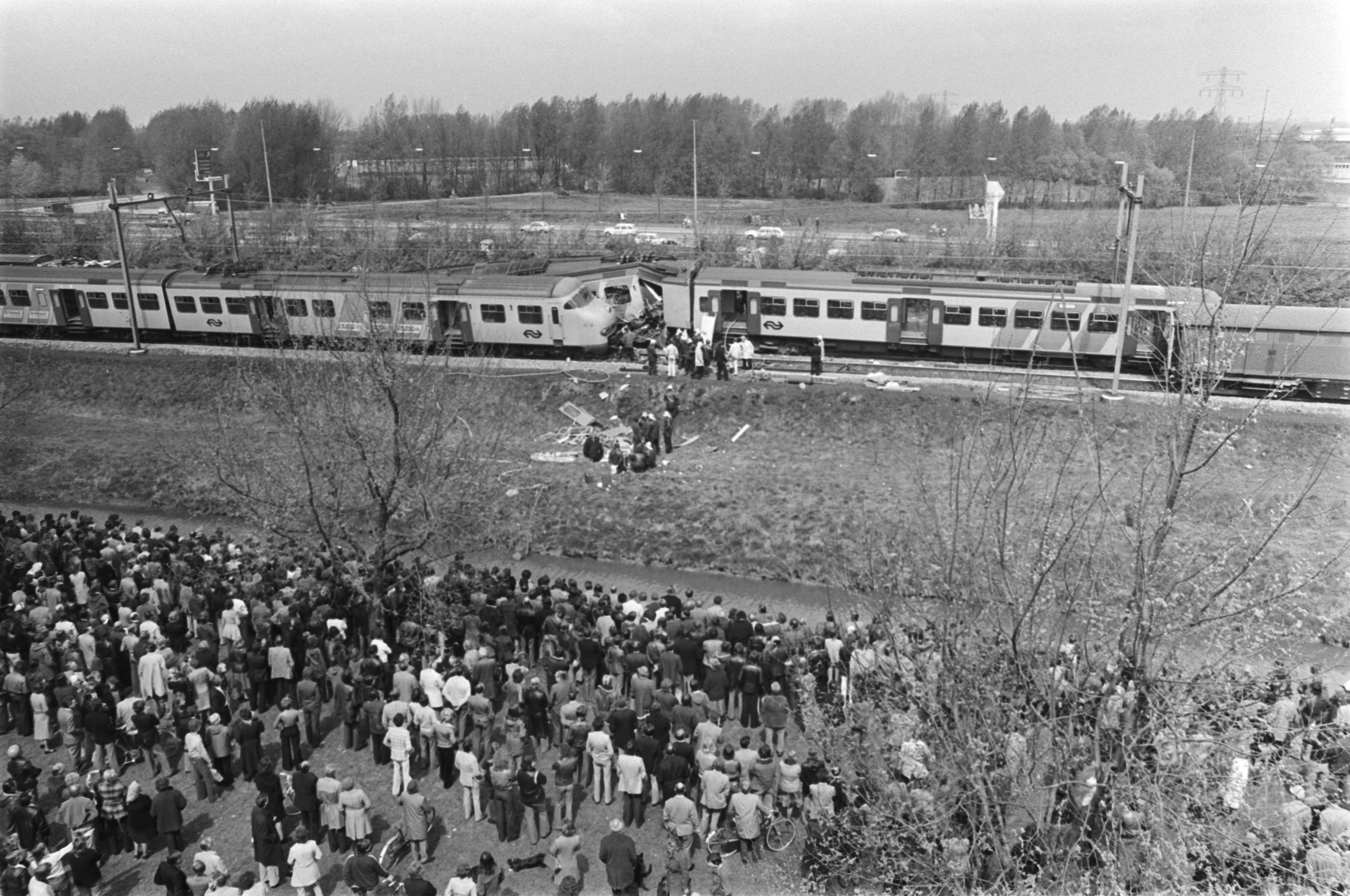
May 4, 1976: Commuter train wreck in Netherlands kills 24 people

The following events occurred in May 1976:

== May 1, 1976 (Saturday) ==
- Italy's President Giovanni Leone dismissed both houses of the Legislatura della Repubblica Italiana and scheduled the first nationwide elections since 1972, to be held on June 20 and 21.
- Demonstrations broke out across the Occupied Palestinian territories during International Workers' Day.
- In one of the closest elections in Australian history, conducted in the state of New South Wales for the 98-seat Legislative Assembly, control was decided by margins of less than 75 votes in each of two electoral districts, Gosford and Hurstville. The Australian Labor Party, led by Neville Wran, won both seats, gaining a 50 to 48 majority over the ruling Liberal/Country Coalition. The Gosford seat was captured by 74 votes out of less than 30,000 cast, while former rugby union star Kevin Ryan defeated incumbent Tom Mead by 44 votes out of 30,566 cast (15,305 to 15,261).
- Former California Governor Ronald Reagan, a challenger to incumbent U.S. President Gerald Ford for the Republican Party presidential nomination, won a large victory over Ford in voting in Texas in the quest for that state's 96 delegates. Reagan won the Indiana and Georgia primaries three days later, prompting questions of whether President Ford would be denied a nomination.
- The West African nation of Togo created the Togolese National Navy, with two patrol boats to guard its 34 miles (55 km) of seacoast and to protect the harbor of the nation's capital, Lomé.
- Southampton F.C., defeated Manchester United in a 1 to 0 upset to win England's soccer football championship tournatment, the FA Cup Final at Wembley Stadium.
- At Hampden Park in Glasgow, Rangers beat Heart of Midlothian F.C. (Hearts), 3 to 1, to win the Scottish Cup soccer football championship of Scotland.
- The Kentucky Derby was won by Bold Forbes, ridden by Angel Cordero, in front of a crowd of 115,387 people at Churchill Downs in Louisville.
- Track and field athlete Mac Wilkins broke the world record for the discus three consecutive times in a single event at San Jose, California, with throws of 69.80 metres (229.0 ft), 70.24 metres (230.4 ft) and 70.86 metres (232.5 ft).
- The popular British heavy metal band Iron Maiden made its debut, playing at St. Nick's Hall in Poplar, East London, before beginning regular performances at the Cart and Horses Pub in Maryland Point, Stratford.
- Died:
  - Alexandros Panagoulis, 36, Greek poet, dissident, and member of the Hellenic Parliament since 1974, was killed in a car accident after being run off the road by another vehicle. Panagoulis had attempted to assassinate dictator Georgios Papadopoulos in 1968, and released after the restoration of democracy in 1974. According to three witnesses, Pangoulis attempted to pass a slower car in front of him at high speed, lost control and skidded on wet pavement into a wall.
  - Michael Gartenschläger, 32, former East German political prisoner who had escaped to West Germany in 1971, and then returned three times, was shot and killed as he attempted to cross back into West Germany from the border city of Büchen.

== May 2, 1976 (Sunday) ==
- At least 15 highway workers and bystanders in Colombia were killed, and 20 others hurt, when they were buried by an avalanche while standing on a highway west of Fresno in the Tolima Department. Many in the group had been passengers on buses that had been traveling between the town of Fresno and the city of Manizales, while others had been clearing Colombia's Highway 50 from a smaller landslide that had happened earlier in the morning. Another 20 were reported missing.
- The Super Proton Synchrotron at CERN was first activated as an improved particle accelerator for physics research. It would lead to "the first great scientific discovery of CERN" in January 1983 when the W and Z bosons were found.
- The German cargo ship Nordhuk ran aground off Eilean Trodday in the Inner Hebrides (United Kingdom) and was wrecked. All twelve crew were rescued by the Stornoway Lifeboat.
- Died: Dan Bankhead, 55, the first African American pitcher in Major League Baseball, died of cancer one day before his 56th birthday. Bankhead, who had played for the Birmingham Black Barons and the Memphis Red Sox in the Negro American League, pitched four innings for the Brooklyn Dodgers on August 26, 1947, and in three other games in the season.

== May 3, 1976 (Monday) ==
- Eleven people were killed when a de Havilland Canada DHC-6 Twin Otter 300 operated by de Havilland Canada suffered the failure of its No. 2 engine on takeoff from Monze Airport in Zambia and crashed one kilometer (0.6 mile) beyond the end of the runway.
- A Pan American World Airways (Pan Am) Boeing 747, nicknamed the Clipper Liberty Bell by the airline, completed its round the world airplane flight in a record 46 hours and 50 seconds, landing back in New York slightly less than two days after it departed. The flight, which bested the previous record by more than 16 hours, would have had a better time except for a two-hour delay in Tokyo because of an airport workers' strike.
- A time bomb, strapped to a motorbike, injured 33 passers-by and bystanders on Ben Yehuda Street in Jerusalem.
- The Wings Over America tour by Paul McCartney's band opened in Fort Worth, Texas, the first time McCartney had performed in the United States since The Beatles' 1966 concert at Candlestick Park.
- Swimmer Linda McGill of Australia became the first person to swim completely around the perimeter of Hong Kong Island, a total distance of almost 28 miles (45 km), finishing in 17 hours and six minutes. Her unofficial record would stand for more than 41 years until November 11, 2017, when it would be bested by Simon Holiday, with a new mark of 12 hours and 32 minutes.
- Attorneys, jurists and other members of the legal profession in India boycotted court to observe "Bar Solidarity Day" as a protest against the suspension of civil rights during the government of Indira Gandhi.
- British commercial diver Anthony Dobson drowned after his umbilical became fouled during his ascent from a dive in the North Sea. The umbilical pulled Dobson out of the dive basket while it was being raised to the surface by the construction and pipelaying barge Orca.
- Died: Minerva Teichert, 87, American painter and mural artist

== May 4, 1976 (Tuesday) ==
- A train wreck in the Netherlands killed 24 people when Stoptrein 4116, a commuter train operating locally in the Rotterdam metro area, was struck head-on by the international Rhine Express D-train 215. Train 4116, in turn, was knocked into another commuter train, 4125. All 24 dead were in the forward carriage of 4116, killing 24 people and seriously injuring another five.
- Spain's third major daily newspaper, El País ("The Nation") began publication.
- The first LAGEOS (Laser Geometric Environmental Observation Survey) satellite was launched, from Vandenberg Air Force Base in the United States.
- Liverpool won England's Football League championship on the final day of play of the 1975-76 season, with a 3 to 1 win over Wolverhampton Wanderers for a record of 23 wins and 14 draws (60 points), one ahead of Queens Park Rangers, which had earlier beaten Leeds United 2 to 0 to finish the season with 24 wins and 11 draws (59 points). Earlier in the season, Liverpool and defeated Queens Park Rangers, 2 to 0.
- The unsuccessful Broadway musical 1600 Pennsylvania Avenue made the first of seven performances, opening at the Mark Hellinger Theatre. Despite music by Leonard Bernstein and lyrics by Alan Jay Lerner, the musical closed four days later on May 8.
- Born: Anza, South African-Japanese singer and actress; as Ōyama Anza, in Cape Town.

== May 5, 1976 (Wednesday) ==
- In the 1976 European Cup Winners' Cup Final at the Heysel Stadium in Brussels, R.S.C. Anderlecht of Belgium defeated West Ham United F.C. of England by 4 goals to 2.
- The United Nations Conference on Trade and Development (UNCTAD) opened in Nairobi with delegates from 150 world nations, with 111 of the poorer nations joining in the conference as the "Group of 77".

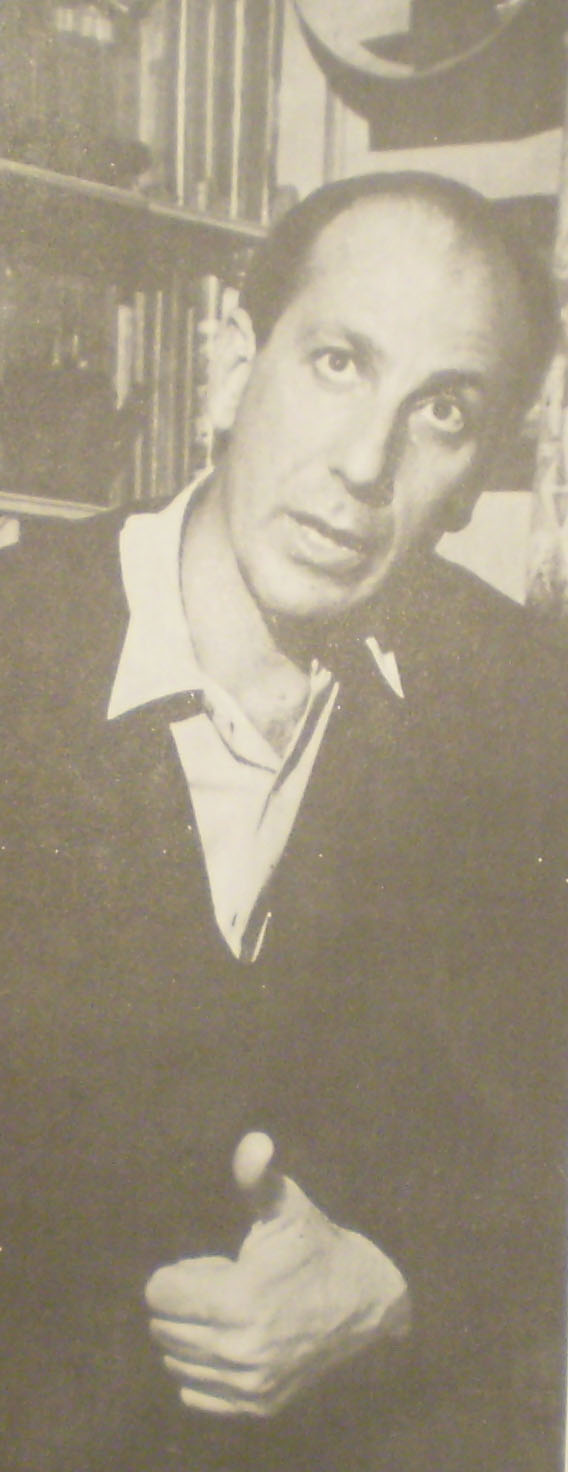
Haroldo Conti, desparecido

- Professor Haroldo Conti, a well-known novelist and screenwriter in Argentina, was arrested in his Buenos Aires apartment after being designated as a subversive agent by the Argentine military government. He was never seen in public again.
- Born : Sage Stallone, American actor and filmmaker, son of Sylvester Stallone; in Los Angeles (d. 2012 of coronary artery disease)

== May 6, 1976 (Thursday) ==
- A 6.5 magnitude earthquake killed 978 people in Italy, and injured 2,400, while leaving 157,000 homeless. The epicenter was the town of Gemona del Friuli in the Province of Udine in north-eastern Italy,
- Restaurants in the Soviet Union capital of Moscow began "meatless Thursdays" under a Communist Party-approved campaign to "help improve the food pattern of Muscovites" an experiment in conserving the supply of meat with the possibility of having the Thursday ban extended nationwide and to markets. Because of a poor grain harvest in 1975, the output of meat had dropped by 11% in the spring of 1976 in comparison to the same period the year before. Restaurants were allowed to substitute fish in place of beef and chicken on Thursdays.
- The United Arab Emirates Armed Forces was created, bringing under one command the individual military forces of the seven individual emirates, which had been linked as allied members of the UAE Federal Armed Forces.
- Died: Koka Subba Rao, 73, former Chief Justice of India

== May 7, 1976 (Friday) ==
- Lebanese Christian militant Jocelyne Khoueiry and six other women defended a building in Martyrs' Square in Beirut from an attack by 300 Palestine Liberation Organization fighters who had made an attack on the Lebanese capital. Khoueiry shot and killed the expedition leader, causing the PLO militia to flee, and became a heroine in the Lebanese Christian community, later commanding a women's militia of 1,000 people.
- Born:
  - Lieutenant Michael P. Murphy, U.S. Navy SEALs commando and Medal of Honor recipient for gallantry during the U.S. War in Afghanistan (killed in action 2005)
  - Stacey Jones, New Zealand professional rugby league star and national team member; in Auckland
  - Sapreet Kaur, American Sikh civil rights activist and director of the U.S. Sikh Coalition; in New Jersey
- Died:
  - Jeanne Toussaint, 89, Belgian-born French custom jewelry designer for the Cartier firm
  - Alison Uttley, 91, English children's writer known for the "Little Grey Rabbit" stories in more than 30 books.

== May 8, 1976 (Saturday) ==
- Japanese inventor Kazuo Hashimoto filed the patent application for the Caller ID that would become the standard for A T & T, improving on the system patented in 1973 by Theodore Paraskevakos. He would be granted U.S. Patent 4,242,539 in 1980. Hashimoto had previously invented first practical telephone answering machine, the Ansa Fone, in 1954.
- Lebanon's Chamber of Deputies voted, 66 to 3, to select Elias Sarkis as President of Lebanon. Pursuant to the Lebanese Constitution, the first round of voting required two-thirds of the 99 members to approve, only 63 of the necessary 66 voted for him. The second round required only 50 of 99 votes, after 31 Deputies chose not to show up. Sarkis was a Maronite Christian, a tradition in Lebanon where the President was Christian and the Prime Minister was Muslim. Despite the vote for Sarkis, the incumbent Suleiman Frangieh refused to step down until the expiration of his six-year term on September 22.
- Born: Martha Wainwright, Canadian singer-songwriter; in Montreal, daughter of Loudon Wainwright III and Kate McGarrigle
- Died:
  - Antonie Stemmler, 83, Swiss-born German nurse and dissident who provided medical treatment to fellow prisoners while imprisoned at the Ravensbrück and Auschwitz concentration camps, recipient of the Florence Nightingale Medal
  - Jean-François Phliponeau, 25, French rugby union player, was playing in an exhibition game for AS Montferrand against Racing Club Vichy when he was struck by a lightning bolt.
  - Trude Guermonprez, 65, German-born American textile and tapestry artist
  - Fred McLeod, 94, American golfer who played in the first U.S. Open and won the tournament in 1908.

== May 9, 1976 (Sunday) ==
- All 17 people on an Imperial Iranian Air Force Flight ULF48 were killed when one of the left wing engines of the Boeing 747 was struck by a lightning bolt as the aircraft was making its approach to Madrid on a flight from Tehran. The explosion that followed caused the entire left wing to fall off of the 747, and the airplane crashed.
- Died:
  - Ulrike Meinhof, 41, West German terrorist and co-founder (with Andreas Baader of the Red Army Faction, commonly called the ""Baader-Meinhof gang". Meinhof was found hanged in her prison cell at the Stammheim Prison in Stuttgart.
  - Jens Bjørneboe, 55, Norwegian novelist and playwright, hanged himself in his home on the island of Veierland.
  - Harvey Fite, 72, American sculptor, died after his riding lawnmower ran over a 12-foot high cliff while he was working on the landscape of his sculpture Opus 40.
  - Otto Kerner Jr., 67, former Governor of Illinois and the first U.S. federal judge to have been sent to prison, died of cancer shortly after his release.

== May 10, 1976 (Monday) ==
- In the U.S., radio news commentator Paul Harvey began the popular daily radio segment The Rest of the Story, consisting of little-known facts about well-known people or events, with a format of not revealing the subject of the script until the very end, and closing with the catchphrase "And now you know...the rest of the story." The series would continue for almost 40 years until Harvey's passing in 2005.
- Jeremy Thorpe resigned as leader of the United Kingdom's Liberal Party following growing criticism from a scandal. He was temporarily replaced by his predecessor, Jo Grimond.
- What two physicists referred to as "the first movie of atoms in action" was shown to reporters at a press conference at the University of Chicago. Albert Crewe and Michael Isaacson, both at the university, showed the 30-second clip which was made with a scanning electron microscope at a magnification of 10,000,000 and photographed "uranium atoms placed on a specimen of carbon one-fifth of a millionth of an inch thick". Crewe said that the motion was unexpected but showed an interaction between the uranium atoms and the carbon.
- Died:
  - Elias Aslaksen, 88, Norwegian Christian cleric who had led the growth of the Brunstad Christian denomination to an organization of more than 200 congregations worldwide.
  - John Murray, South African jurist and Chief Justice of Southern Rhodesia from 1955 to 1961.

== May 11, 1976 (Tuesday) ==
- A tanker truck carrying more than 7,000 gallons of anhydrous ammonia fell from a freeway in Houston, Texas and ruptured. In addition to the driver, who died of his injuries, six people were killed and 200 others were injured by the ammonia gas. The driver was reportedly speeding and following a car in front of him too closely, then crashed through a guardrail and plunged to a ramp below.
- Amendments to the Federal Election Campaign Act were signed into United States law by President Gerald Ford.
- Bolivia's Ambassador to France, Joaquin Zenteno Anaya, was assassinated by a gunman while standing underneath a railroad bridge. A spokesman for a group calling itself the International Che Guevara Brigade took responsibility for the killing, and stated that Zenteno had been targeted for his role as the Bolivian Army general in charge of the Santa Cruz region where Che Guevara had been captured and killed in 1967. " Zenteno had served as Foreign Minister of Bolivia from 1964 to 1966
- Died: Alvar Aalto, 78, Finnish architect and designer

== May 12, 1976 (Wednesday) ==
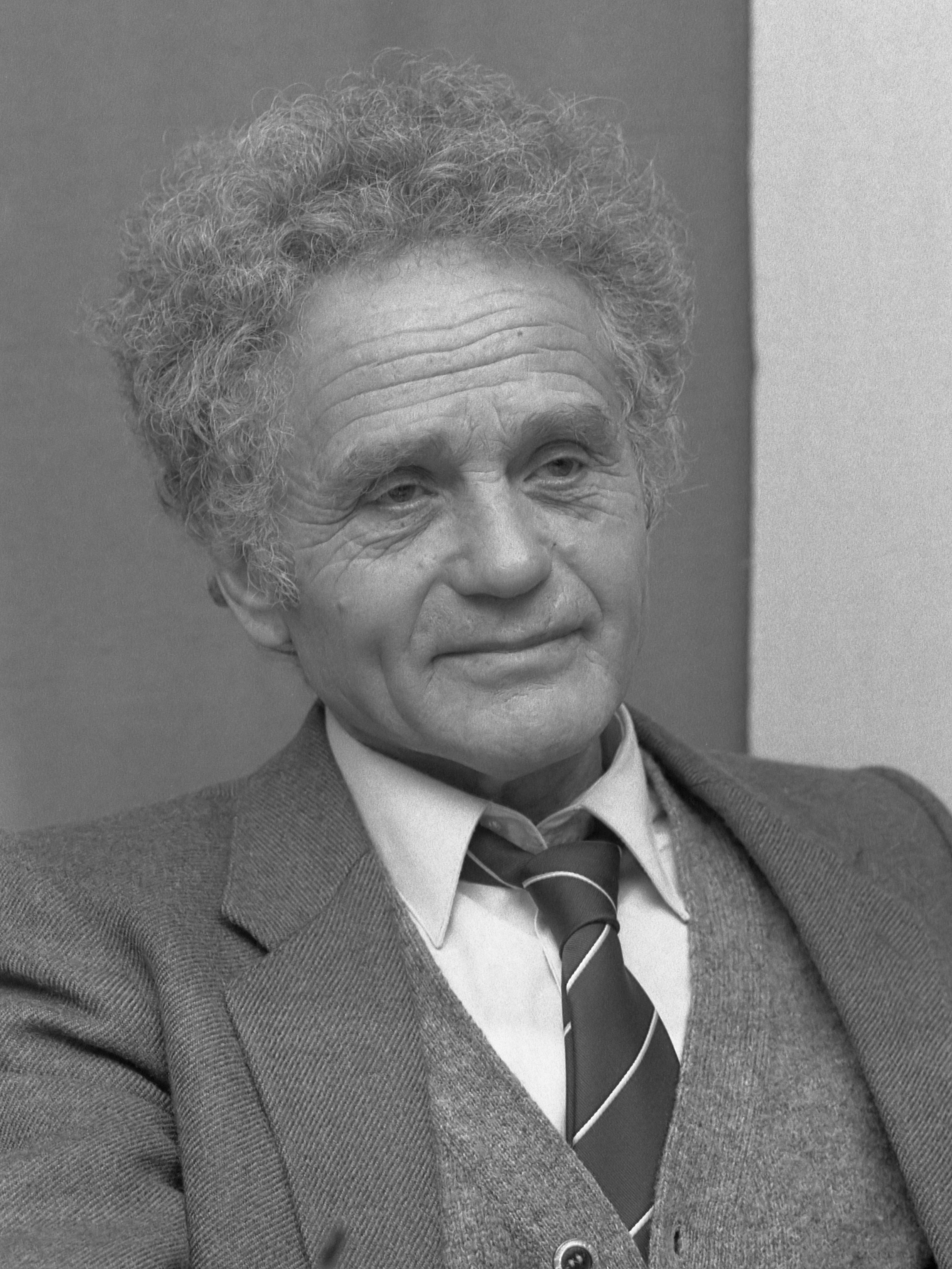
Orlov

- Soviet physicist and dissident Yuri Orlov held a press conference in Moscow and announced the formation of the Moscow Helsinki Group in order to monitor and report on his nation's compliance with pledges of protecting the human rights of Soviet citizens, made in the Helsinki Accords of August 1, 1975. Orlov would be arrested on February 10, 1977, after disobeying orders from the Soviet government to disband the group.
- U.S. President Gerald Ford and Soviet Communist leader Leonid Brezhnev initialed a treaty that set limits on the size of underground nuclear explosions for peaceful purposes, but both sides postponed formal ceremonies that had been planned for May 13.
- All 39 crew of the Spanish tanker Urquiola were killed when the vessel exploded and caught fire in A Coruña harbour.
- FC Bayern Munich of West Germany defeated AS Saint-Étienne of France, 1 to 0, to win the European Cup at Hampden Park in Glasgow before a crowd of almost 50,000.
- Died:
  - Rudolf Kempe, 65, German orchestral conductor and chief conductor for the BBC Symphony Orchestra;
  - Keith Relf, 33, English rock musician and the lead vocalist for The Yardbirds, was accidentally electrocuted at his studio at home while playing an electric guitar.
  - Bettie Fisher, 36, Australian Aboriginal musician and theater manager, from arteriosclerosis and heart failure
  - Carlos Muñoz Pizarro, 62, Chilean botanist and conservationist

== May 13, 1976 (Thursday) ==
- The final game of the American Basketball Association was played, as the ABA's New York Nets defeated the Denver Nuggets, 112 to 106, to win the ABA championship in the best of seven championship series, 4 games to 2, before a crowd of 15,934 spectators. The next month, the Nets and Nuggets were accepted as members of the National Basketball Association, along with the Indiana Pacers and the San Antonio Spurs pursuant to a merger agreement between the two leagues. The league had started play on October 13, 1967, when the Nets and the Nuggets were known as the New Jersey Americans and the Denver Rockets, respectively.
- One of the first popular arcade video games, Breakout, designed by the Atari corporation, was introduced by Namco in Japan.
- The first of two lunar eclipses of 1976 took place, and was visible in South America, Europe, Africa, Asia and Australia.
- Born: Angelena Bonet, award-winning Australian documentary film maker, supermodel and actress; in Sydney
- Died:
  - Eric Sherbrooke Walker, 88, British-born Kenyan hotelier and conservationist known for creating the Treetops Hotel in 1932 to allow visitors to safely observe Kenyan wildlife in what is now the Aberdare National Park. Walker had created the Outspan Hotel in 1928 upon 69 acres (28 ha) of land that he had purchased for wildlife protection.
  - Roberto Batata (nickname for Roberto Monteiro), 26, Brazilian soccer football forward and 1975 national team member during the Copa América, was killed in an automobile accident on the Rodovia Fernão Dias highway near Belo Horizonte.

== May 14, 1976 (Friday) ==
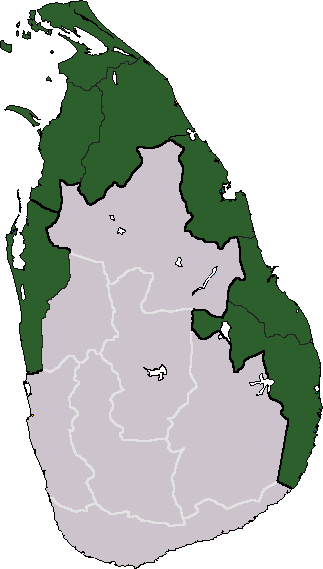
Tamil Eelam claimed portion of Sri Lanka, in green

- Delegates to a convention of the Tamil United Liberation Front (TULF), formed in 1972 by three political parties representing Sri Lanka's Tamil minority, voted to pass the Vaddukoddai Resolution, the first demand for a separate nation. The proposed "Tamil Eelam" was to comprise the Northern Province, the Eastern Province, and the Puttalam District of the North Western Province. Running on a campaign of secession and separation from the majority Sinhalese ethnic group, the TULF would become the main opposition party in the 1977 parliamentary election.

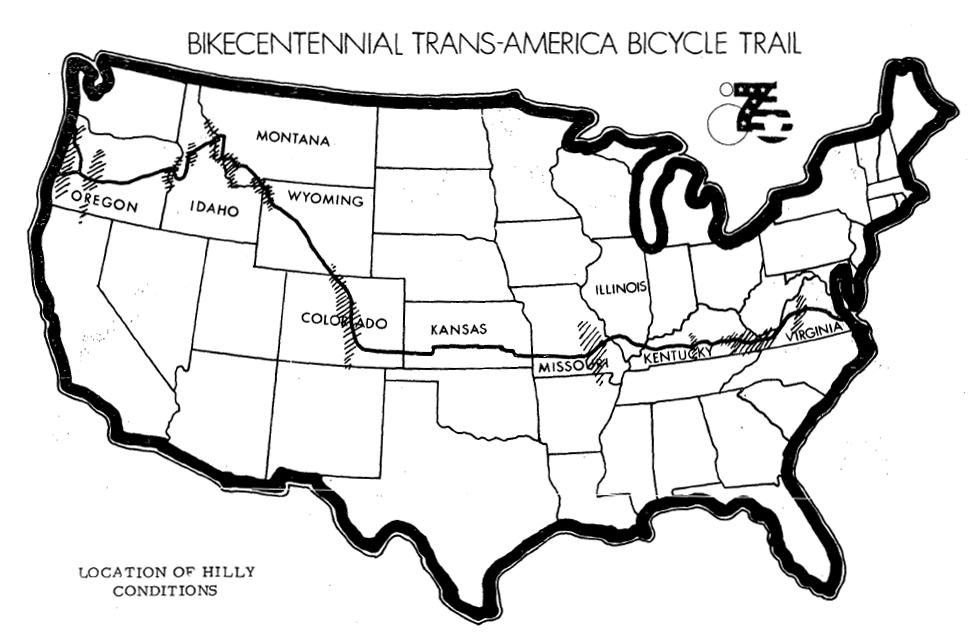
Route of the TransAmerica Trail

- The TransAmerica Bicycle Trail, the first bicycle touring route in the U.S. designated to run from coast to coast, was inaugurated as part of the Bikecentennial celebrations during the 200th year of independence of the United States. The 4,228 mi (6,804 km) route runs through ten states from Astoria, Oregon to Yorktown, Virginia, crossing Idaho, Montana, Wyoming, Colorado, Kansas, Missouri, Illinois and Kentucky.
- In Paris, a gunman shot and killed Jacques Chaine, the president of France's second-largest bank, Crédit Lyonnais. Chaine had been driven to his office on the Boulevard des Italiens and was getting out of his car when he was shot in the chest by a 22-year-old shipyard welder, Jean Bilski. Bilski shot Chaine's wife and then killed himself with a gunshot to the head.
- NASA announced that it would accept applications for 30 additional astronauts to fly on "United States—European space shuttle project involving 200 flights starting in 1980", with eligibility open to women and to foreign scientists, including those from the Soviet Union.
- Born: Martine McCutcheon, English TV actress and singer; in Hackney, London.
- Died: David Fenbury, 60, Australian government official and retired Secretary of Home Affairs, died of injuries from being struck by a bus while walking

== May 15, 1976 (Saturday) ==
- All 52 people aboard Aeroflot Flight 1802 were killed after the Antonov An-24 propeller plane suffered a mechanical failure following its takeoff from Vinnytsia in the Ukrainian SSR on a flight to Moscow. At an altitude of 5,700 metres (18,700 ft) the airplane suddenly went into a tailspin after its rudder jammed, and the force of the propellers began losing blades. The plane crashed about 15 kilometres (9.3 mi) from the Ukrainian city of Chernihiv.
- Nigerian Army Colonel B. S. Dimka and six convicted co-conspirators in his attempted coup d'état on February 13, were publicly executed by a firing squad at the Kirikiri Maximum Security Prison in Lagos. Colonel Joseph Gomwalk, Dimka's aide, was executed in the same group.
- Born: Anuj Sharma, Indian film, stage and television actor; in Bhatapara, Madhya Pradesh state, later the state of Chhattisgarh.
- Died: Samuel Eliot Morison, 88, American history writer described as "the undisputed Grand Old Man of American Historians."

== May 16, 1976 (Sunday) ==
- The Montreal Canadiens defeated the Philadelphia Flyers, 5 to 3, to win the National Hockey League championship, sweeping the Stanley Cup series four games to none. In the first three games, the Canadiens had edged the Flyers by one goal in each contest, 4–3, 2-1 and 3–2.
- The Head of State of Ethiopia, Brigadier General Tafari Benti, appeared on national television and radio and offered to enter into a ceasefire in the Eritrean War of Independence with rebels in the province Eritrea, which Emperor Haile Selassie had annexed in 1962. General Benti proposed amnesty to most Eritrean political prisoners, an end to the state emergency, financial assistance and possible regional autonomy.
- The Vuelta a España cycle race was won by José Pesarrodona of Spain.
- General Manuel Alfonso Rodriguez, the Chief of Staff of the El Salvador, was arrested in New York City and charged with taking part with six accomplices in attempting to sell 10,000 submachine guns to agents whom they thought were members of organized crime in the city.
- Born: Marco Ganci, Italian Roman Catholic priest and Vatican City's permanent observer to the European Union; in Catanzaro
- Died: Otello Buscherini, 27, Italian motorcycle racer, was killed in an accident at the Nations Grand Prix at the Mugello Circuit track near Florence at Scarperia e San Piero.

== May 17, 1976 (Monday) ==
- France's President Valery Giscard d'Estaing arrived for a state visit to the United States, landing at Andrews Air Force Base as a passenger in a Concorde, marking the first time that the supersonic airplane had come to the U.S.; Giscard's flight came one week before the Concorde would inaugurate commercial service in Washington. Two days later, Giscard flew on the Concorde to Texas and landed in Houston.

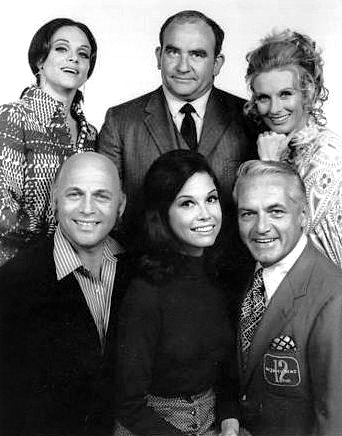
(lower right corner) Emmy-winning comedians Moore and Knight

- The Emmy Awards ceremony for achievement in U.S. prime time television were handed out at the Shubert Theatre in Los Angeles. The hosts were John Denver and Mary Tyler Moore (who won the award for "Outstanding Lead Actress in a Comedy Series" and whose popular sitcom The Mary Tyler Moore Show won "Outstanding Comedy Series"). Her co-stars Betty White and Ted Knight won the awards for best supporting actress and best supporting actor in a comedy series. NBC's Saturday Night won the award for "Outstanding Variety Series" in its first season.
- Adventurer Tim Severin and a crew of four departed in a leather boat from Tralee in Ireland's County Kerry, as part of an effort to prove that the 6th-century monk Saint Brendan of Clonfert could have, as Irish legend has it, traveled to North America more than nine centuries before Christopher Columbus. The 36 ft (11 m) long vessel, named the Brendan, was "made of the hides of 42 oxen" with a sail made of goat skins and set to retrace the route referred to in The Voyage of Saint Brendan the Abbot, of a voyage said to have been made in the year 565.
- The British Broadcasting Corporation (BBC) launched BBC Radio Highland in the Scottish city of Inverness, providing the first regular Scottish Gaelic language programming for roughly 60,000 native speakers of the language in the United Kingdom. The service will be superseded by the launch, in 1985, of BBC Radio nan Gàidheal.
- Born: Wang Leehom, American-Taiwanese singer-songwriter, actor, producer, and film director; in Rochester, New York
- Died: Charles Stepney, 45, American songwriter and record producer, from a heart attack

== May 18, 1976 (Tuesday) ==
- Héctor Gutiérrez Ruiz, the former President of the Chamber of Deputies of Uruguay and former Uruguayan Minister of Industry Zelmar Michelini, both of whom had gone into exile in Argentina after a coup d'état in 1973, were kidnapped by a military group in separate operations. Their bodies were found three days later in a car abandoned in downtown Buenos Aires.
- U.S. President Ford defeated challenger Ronald Reagan in a "must-win" primary in his home state of Michigan, as well as in Maryland, ending a streak of primary losses. Ford's win is seen by political observers as assuring that he will get the nomination at the Republican national convention.
- David Bowie's Isolar tour ended in the Pavilion de Paris, the last of 65 dates.

== May 19, 1976 (Wednesday) ==
- Liverpool F.C. of England, the First Division champion for 1975–76, won the UEFA Cup in the second of two games, after having defeated Belgian First Division champion Club Brugge KV, 3 to 2, in the first game on April 28. Liverpool's one-goal advantage stood after they and Brugge played to a 1 to 1 draw at the Olympiastadion in Brugges.
- Keith Richards of the Rolling Stones was involved in a car crash near Newport Pagnell, UK, and was arrested for being found in possession of an illegal substance.
- Born: Kevin Garnett, American pro basketball power forward with 21 seasons in the National Basketball Association from 1995 to 2016; NBA Most Valuable Player for 2004; in Greenville, South Carolina

== May 20, 1976 (Thursday) ==
The Montreal Biosphere in flames

- The acrylic bubble of the Montreal Biosphere, designed by Buckminster Fuller for Expo 67, was destroyed by a fire when a welder's torch ignited the structure during remodeling in what one author would describe as "the death of an idea and a system of construction that had gripped the imagination of architects in the modern era." The steel frame survived, and the Biosphere buildings inside would be remodeled and reopened in 1990, albeit without the transparent panels.

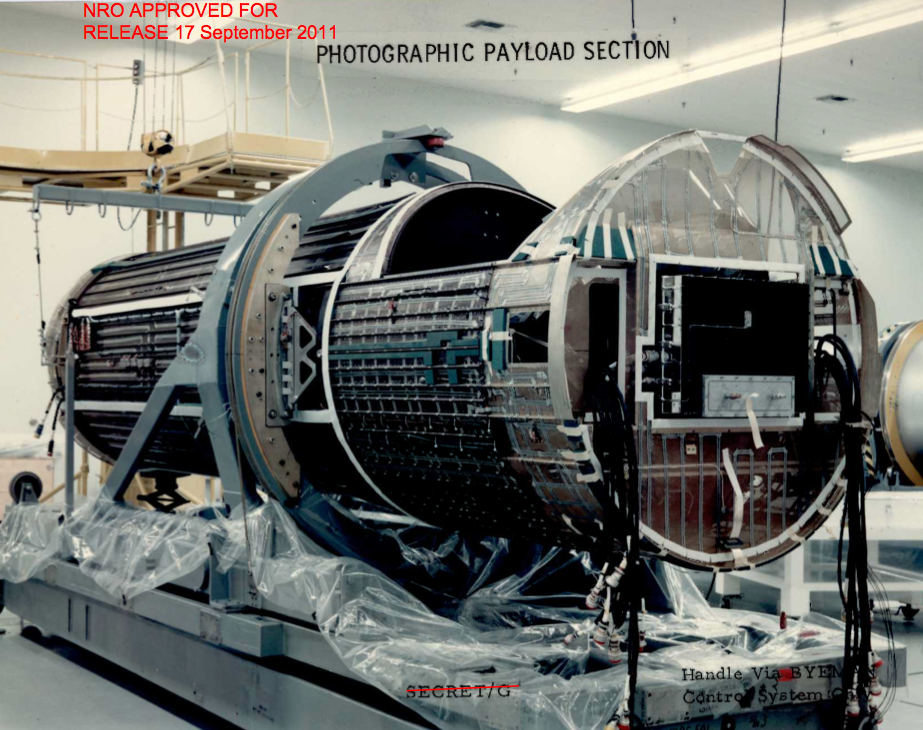
A GAMBIT-3 spy satellite

- One of the American GAMBIT-3 reconnaissance satellites failed to reach orbit after being launched from Vandenberg Air Force Base in California, and was lost as it returned to Earth. Although the National Reconnaissance Office had predicted the impact zone in South Africa, the remains of the satellite came down over England, and crashed on a farm 75 miles (121 km) north of London. Five months later, a U.S. technician for Aerospace Corporation heard about the rumors and found that the remains of GAMBIT-3 number 35 were housed in a laboratory at the Royal Air Force Base at Farnborough in Hampshire, which returned the components to the Americans.
- Mobutu Sese Seko, the President of Zaire (now the Republic of Congo), gave official endorsement the concept of kleptocracy — the practice of public officials stealing tax money for personal use — in a speech at a stadium before 70,000 people and millions of listeners. Mobutu, who "personally spent on average more than 35 percent of the national budget on himself" during the 1970s and 1980s, told the crowd "If you want to steal, steal in a nice way, but if you steal too much to become rich overnight you will soon be caught."
- Born: Ramón Hernández, Venezuelan baseball player; in Caracas
- Died:
  - Syd Howe, 64, Canadian ice hockey player for 16 NHL seasons and Hockey Hall of Fame enshrinee
  - Irina Zarubina, 69, Soviet Russian film star known for The First Trolleybus (Krespostnaya aktrika) and Alyonka
  - Bobby Pearce, 70, Australian rower and two time Olympic gold medalist
  - U.S. Navy Admiral Royal E. Ingersoll, 92, Commander of the U.S. Atlantic Fleet during World War II
  - Joseph Brocchini, 43, New York mobster of the Lucchese crime family nicknamed "Joe Bikini". Brochinni had given Gambino crime family assassin Roy DeMeo a black eye in a fight, and DeMeo shot him at his used car dealership in Queens

== May 21, 1976 (Friday) ==
- The worst school bus crash in U.S. history killed 29 of the 53 people on board, all but one of them students in the choir of Yuba City High School. Near Martinez, California, the bus broke through a guardrail and plunged off of an elevated exit ramp from Interstate 680 and fell 22 feet (6.7 m), landing on its roof and crushing the bus down to the level of the seats. The other 24 people on board, including the driver, survived but were seriously injured. The National Transportation Safety Board would conclude a year later that the bus driver had failed to monitor the air-brake pressure and didn't put on an emergency brake "because he did not know the location of the emergency air lever." Other factors were a failure to discover and replace an old air-compressor drive belt, the lack of a sign to warn drivers of the steep ramp, and a poorly designed ramp curb.
- Don Juan de Borbón, at one time the heir to the Spanish throne until 1931, when his father King Alfonso XIII was dethroned, returned to Spain for the first time in more than 40 years. Don Juan, who lived in exile in Portugal, was welcomed by his son King Juan Carlos I in Madrid, and the two then dined at a private lunch at the Palace of Zarzuela.
- Five prominent Tamil members of the parliament of Sri Lanka were arrested on charges of sedition after distributing leaflets, including Appapillai Amirthalingam, who would be acquitted in 1977 and become Leader of the Opposition in Parliament.
- The University of Kragujevac was founded in Yugoslavia in the city of Kragujevac, SR Serbia.
- The "Famous Fire" in McKeesport, Pennsylvania, destroyed seven downtown structures, damaged more than 12 others, and started fires in at least 10 homes.
- Died: Torbert Macdonald, 58, U.S. Representative for Massachusetts since 1955, died of cancer.

== May 22, 1976 (Saturday) ==
- The parents of coma patient Karen Ann Quinlan, who had become a symbol for the "right to die" movement, had their daughter removed from life support after being granted the right to do so by the New Jersey Supreme Court. To the surprise of most people, Quinlan no longer required the ventilator to keep her alive and was able to breathe on her own. She would survive for nine more years before her death on June 11, 1985, at the age of 31.
- The last major confrontation of the "Cod Wars" between the fleets of Iceland and the United Kingdom took place when the Royal Navy frigate HMS Leander rammed the Icelandic Coast Guard vessel ICGV Ver, with both ships sustaining damage. A week later, the British government announced that it was ordering the flotilla of Royal Navy frigates out of the area while an agreement to end the seven-month-long conflict was being negotiated.
- The Pennsylvania Opera Theater in Philadelphia, which dedicated itself to presenting rarely-performed English language operatic works and new compositions, staged its first performance, reviving Otto Nicolai's 1849 operatic adaptation of Shakespeare's play The Merry Wives of Windsor. TPOT would close in 1993 because of financial difficulties.
- Died: Oscar Bonavena, 33, the heavyweight boxing champion of Argentina, was shot by security guard Willard Ross Brymer, who was later convicted of manslaughter. The confrontation between Bonavena and Brymer took place after Bonavena got into an argument with the owner of the legalized brothel at the Mustang Ranch near Reno, Nevada.

== May 23, 1976 (Sunday) ==
- Ten passengers on Philippine Air Lines Flight 116 were killed in a rescue attempt after six hijackers had taken control of the jet on May 21 and forced it to land at Zamboanga International Airport. The terrorists, three of whom were killed in a gun battle, detonated grenades inside the BAC One-Eleven jet as security forces stormed the aircraft.
- In South Korea, a fuel truck driver's attempt to cross a railroad track in front of an oncoming train killed 19 people in Seoul and injured 95 others. In addition to the truck driver, his co-worker and 15 passengers on the train, two children who had been playing nearby had burned to death in the fiery explosion of the truck, which was hauling 200 drums of heating oil.
- An interfaith worship event, the Spiritual Life Jubilee, was conducted in Los Angeles in front of the Peoples Temple, a Christian denomination led by Reverend Jim Jones (who would conduct the Jonestown mass murder-suicide of 918 people in Guyana in 1978). Warith Deen Mohammed, the Muslim leader of the World Community of Islam in the West conducted a Sunni Islam prayer service at the invitation of Jones.
- The Winnipeg Jets defeated the Houston Aeros, 9 to 1, to sweep the AVCO World Trophy series, 4 games to 0, to win the championship of the World Hockey Association.
- The 1976 German Open tennis tournament was won by Eddie Dibbs in the men's singles and Sue Barker in the women's singles.
- The 1976 Yugoslavian motorcycle Grand Prix took place at the Opatija Circuit, and was won by Olivier Chevallier of France.

== May 24, 1976 (Monday) ==
- The Concorde supersonic airliner began commercial operations in the United States, as a British Airways flight from London landed at Washington, DC's Dulles Airport, followed by an Air France flight arriving from Paris three minutes later. The cost of a one-way flight from Paris to Washington was $827 (equivalent to $4,000 in 2021)
- A wine competition nicknamed "The Judgment of Paris", was held in Paris, France, by British wine merchant Steven Spurrier. The contest involved a blind wine tasting by 11 judges, nine of whom were French, with five French wines and five American wines in each category to be sampled. To the surprise of onlookers, the top-ranked red wine in judging was a 1973 vintage Cabernet Sauvignon from Stag's Leap Wine Cellars of Napa, California, ahead the best of the Château Mouton-Rothschild from Pauillac near Bordeaux. For white wine, a chardonnay from Chateau Montelena of Calistoga, California bested the Meursault wine of Domaine Roulot.
- Australia awarded knighthoods for the first time, with the title of Knight of the Order of Australia (AK) conferred upon the Governor-General of Australia Sir John Kerr, and Sir Robert Menzies, who had served as Prime Minister of Australia from 1949 to 1966.
- Japan, the only nation that had ever suffered an atomic bomb attack, agreed to sign the Nuclear Non-Proliferation Treaty, eight years after it had opened for signatures.

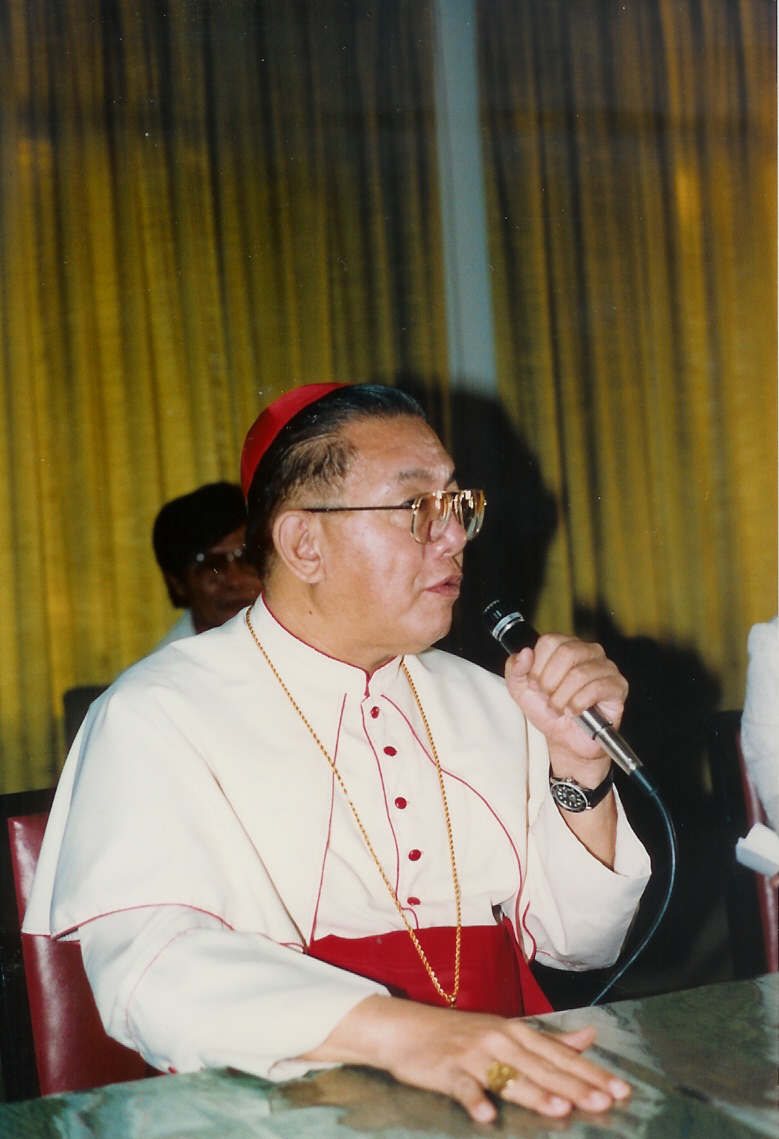
Cardinal Sin

- At a ceremony in Vatican City, 21 Roman Catholic clerics were elevated to the rank of Cardinal by Pope Paul VI, who had announced his intentions on April 27. Among those made cardinals were Trinh Nhu Khue, the Archbishop of Hanoi, who had been appointed without being publicly identified because of concerns that he would be persecuted, although Vietnam's Communist government permitted him to accept the honor. František Tomášek of Czechoslovakia, the Archbishop of Prague, would be identified by name in 1977. Jaime Sin, the Archbishop of Manila, was elevated, prompting jokes in the Philippine press that "Cardinal Sin" had been approved by the Vatican.
- Elections for the 70-seat National Assembly of Malawi were conducted, with all 70 candidates selected by President Hastings Banda from proposals of up to five candidates for each electoral district.
- Died:
  - Denise Pelletier, 53, Canadian stage, film and television actress, during heart surgery
  - Gertrude Bryan, 87, American stage actress

== May 25, 1976 (Tuesday) ==
- In Spain, the Cortes passed the new Law of Assembly permitting public protests, but only with prior authorization by the government. After Interior Minister Manuel Fraga Iribarne told the assembly, "His majesty and the entire nation have turned decidedly in the direction of democratic freedom," right-wing opposition was dropped and only 4 of the 550 deputies and senators present voted no on the motion, with 23 abstentions.
- Sir Douglas Nicholls was announced as the first Australian Aborigine to serve as a governor of an Australian state, to assume office as Governor of South Australia effective December 1.
- Born:
  - Nadine Heredia, Peruvian politician, President of the Peruvian Nationalist Party and former First Lady of Peru (2011 to 2016) as the wife of Ollanta Humala; in Lima;
  - Mehran Khaghani, British-born American comedian; in London
  - Cillian Murphy, Irish stage and film actor; in Cork
  - Stefan Holm, Swedish athlete and 2004 Olympic gold medalist in the high jump; in Forshaga
  - Ofir Lobel, Israeli comedian; to Israeli parents stationed in Bologna in Italy
- Died:
  - Agnes Morgan, 96, American playwright, actress, and theatrical director and producer
  - Sir Lalitha Rajapakse, 76, Sri Lankan government official, first Minister of Justice for Ceylon and later Ceylon/Sri Lanka's diplomatic representative to the United Kingdom
  - A. P. Rowe, 78, British physicist and pioneer in radar development
  - Félix B. Caignet, 84, Cuban radio producer

== May 26, 1976 (Wednesday) ==
- Juan Maino, a Chilean photojournalist and political activist who led the leftist opposition group Movimiento de Acción Popular Unitaria (MAPU), disappeared after being arrested by agents of Chile's secret police, the Dirección de Inteligencia Nacional (DINA). Maino was picked up by DINA agents at an apartment in Ñuñoa, a suburb of Santiago. Maino and his fellow MAPU members, Antonio Elizondo and Elizabeth Rekas (who had been arrested earlier that day), were never seen again.
- Police in Paris arrested four of five people who had carried out the 1972 hijacking of Delta Air Lines Flight 841. George Brown, Joyce Brown, Melvin McNair and Jean McNair, all members of the Black Liberation Army, had lived in France since 1973. The two women would be released after being found guilty and given suspended sentences, while the two men would stay in prison until 1981.
- Born: Alexander Karim, Ugandan-Swedish TV actor and the first black TV star on Swedish television; in Uppsala
- Died:
  - Martin Heidegger, 86, German philosopher
  - John T. Scalish, 63, American mobster and leader of the Cleveland Mafia, during heart surgery. The death of Scalish, called "John Scalise" within the mob, resulted in a gang-war between James T. Licavoli and two rivals, Danny Greene and John Nardi of the Celtic Club, with 26 car bombings, two of which killed Nardi and then Greene in 1977.

== May 27, 1976 (Thursday) ==
- Mao Zedong, the leader of the People's Republic of China as Chairman of the Chinese Communist Party, was seen in public for the last time, a little more than three months before his September 9 death, as he welcomed Pakistan's President Zulfikar Ali Bhutto to Beijing. The occasion marked the last time that a photograph was taken of Chairman Mao before his death.
- Janet Guthrie became the first woman to qualify for a NASCAR race, earning the 27th starting position (out of 40) in the World 600 at the Charlotte Motor Speedway with an average speed of 152.797 miles per hour (245.903 km/h). On May 30, Guthrie, an aerospace engineer and physicist, surprised skeptics by finishing in 15th place in the World 600 race, which was won by David Pearson.
- Outgoing UK prime minister Harold Wilson's controversial Resignation Honours list was published. Among those honoured were businessman Eric Miller, who gained a knighthood but would commit suicide a year later while being investigated for fraud, and Joseph Kagan, who was elevated to the peerage; Kagan was the developer of the textile used in the Gannex raincoats which Wilson habitually wore.
- Raymundo Gleyzer, a political documentary filmmaker, was arrested by agents of Chile's secret police, the DINA, and never seen in public again.
- Died:
  - Abby Rockefeller Mauzé, 72, American philanthropist
  - Ruth McDevitt, 80, American film and TV character actress known for portraying old ladies; she had a recurring role on Kolchak: The Night Stalker at the age of 79.
  - Hilde Hildebrand, 78, German film actress

== May 28, 1976 (Friday) ==
- The Medical Device Regulation Act was signed into law by U.S. President Ford, granting the U.S. Food and Drug Administration authority to regulate medical devices that had been prescribed by physicians, with a different standard applied to devices depending on whether an FDA panel classified them as Class I, II or III with Class III being deemed a high risk to the user. Congress had enacted the legislation, which amended the Food, Drug, and Cosmetic Act of 1938, after the first reports of injuries to over 900,000 women who had used the Dalkon Shield intrauterine device for contraception. In a speech made after signing the bill, President Ford said "Until today, the American consumer could not be sure that a medical device used by his physician, his hospital, or himself was as safe and effective as it could or should be," and described the law as fixing "the deficiencies that accorded FDA 'horse and buggy' authority to deal with 'laser age' problems".
- U.S. President Ford at the White House and Soviet leader Leonid Brezhnev at the Kremlin held simultaneous ceremonies signing the treaty to limit the size of underground nuclear tests during peacetime and providing the first on-site inspection of compliance. The ceremony began at 1500 UTC, 10:00 a.m. in Washington and 6:00 p.m. in Moscow.
- The International Women's Professional Softball Association (IWPSA), founded by women's tennis champion Billie Jean King, softball star Joan Joyce, and sports entrepreneur Dennis Murphy, made its debut with 10 teams, six of which played in its opening day doubleheaders, starting with the Connecticut Falcons (Meriden CT) beating the host Buffalo Breskis, 1 to 0 followed later by the San Jose Sunbirds defeating The Phoenixbird in Tempe, Arizona, and the San Diego Sandpipers beating the Southern California Gems, 1–0, in San Bernardino, California. The other IWPSA teams were the Chicago Ravens, Michigan Travelers (Detroit), Pennsylvania Liberties (Reading) and the Santa Ana (CA) Lionettes.
- Born: Maryam Ebrahimi Iranian-born Emmy Award-winning Swedish documentary filmmaker; in Tehran
- Died:
  - Zainul Abedin, 61, Bangladeshi painter
  - Antoni Uniechowski, 73, Polish book illustrator

== May 29, 1976 (Saturday) ==
- The European Women's Basketball Championship, held in France, was won by the Soviet Union women's team, which not only went unbeaten in nine games, but outscored its opponents by an average of 40 points per game. In their final game on May 28, the Soviet women had defeated previously unbeaten Czechoslovakia, 62 to 30.
- Born: Gülşen Bayraktar Çolakoğlu, best-selling Turkish singer known professionally by her first name; in Fatih, Istanbul
- Died: Robert Smallbones, 92, British diplomat who used his authority as Consul-General in Frankfurt am Main to provide exit visas for more than 48,000 German Jews prior to the outbreak of World War II.

== May 30, 1976 (Sunday) ==
- The Indianapolis 500 motor race, held at the Indianapolis Motor Speedway in the United States, was shortened to 255 miles because of bad weather, and was won by Johnny Rutherford, who walked into Victory Lane instead of driving his car there. Rutherford had been in first place after 102 laps, slightly more than halfway through the race, when heavy rains fell starting at 12:42 in the afternoon. After a delay of two-and-a-half-hours, track officials halted the shortest-ever Indianapolis 500, referred to in racing history as "The Indianapolis 255".
- NASCAR's World 600 race was held at the Charlotte Motor Speedway in Concord, North Carolina and was won by David Pearson.
- The Formula One Monaco Grand Prix was held in Monte Carlo and won by Niki Lauda.
- A "yes or no" election was held in Bulgaria for the 400 seats in the unicameral parliament, the Narodno sabranie. All 400 candidates were pre-approved by the Fatherland Front, dominated by the Bulgarian Communist Party which had 272 of the candidates, while another 100 were selected by the Front from the Bulgarian Agrarian National Union.
- A series of explosions caused by gasoline released into a sewer killed 3 people in Pfaffenthal, Luxembourg.
- Died:
  - Mitsuo Fuchida, 73, Japanese naval officer and captain in the Imperial Japanese Navy Air Service, who coordinated and led the first bombing attacks on Pearl Harbor on December 7, 1941; later a Christian missionary and author of three books
  - Max Carey (Maximillian Carnarius), 86, American National League baseball center fielder for 19 seasons, enshrinee at the National Baseball Hall of Fame for his record of most stolen bases (738) in his career
  - Washington Etchamendi, 55, Uruguayan soccer football manager for the Deportivo Cali team in Colombia and former coach of the top-tier Nacional team, suffered a fatal attack while his team was playing Independiente Santa Fe in Cali.
  - Louis Empain, 68, Belgian financier and philanthropist

== May 31, 1976 (Monday) ==
- Syria began an invasion of Lebanon with a force of 60 tanks and 2,000 Syrian Army troops, beginning 29 years of occupation of the Middle Eastern nation.
- The 37-member "People's Assembly of East Timor", installed by the Indonesian government after Indonesia's invasion of the former Portuguese Timor in 1975, voted unanimously in favor of the "Act of Integration" to make East Timor Indonesia's 27th province, effective July 17.
- The United Kingdom and Iceland began negotiations in Norway to end the Cod Wars over commercial fishing in North Atlantic Waters, as a nine-member delegation led by British Foreign Secretary Anthony Crossland met in Oslo with a seven-member group led by Icelandic Foreign Minister Einar Augustsson.
- The Who set a record, recognized by Guinness World Records, for "loudest band", with a measurement of 126 decibels at a concert at The Valley in Charlton, London, breaking the 1972 record of 117 dB set by Deep Purple. Guinness would discontinue the category in 1985 as a matter of public policy because of concerns that permanent hearing damage would result from artists attempting to break the record.
- Born: Colin Farrell, Irish actor; in Castleknock, Dublin
- Died:
  - Jacques Monod, 66, French biochemist and 1965 Nobel Prize laureate in medicine
  - Martha Mitchell, 57, American socialite whose controversial remarks, while her husband John Mitchell was U.S. Attorney General, caused controversy during the administration of U.S. President Richard Nixon.
