= The Gemini =

2016 Burmese drama film

- Theatrical poster
- Directed by: Nyo Min Lwin
- Screenplay by: Lynn Myat Thwin
- Story by: Bhone Htut Khaung
- Produced by: Thit Thit Myint Saing
- Starring: Okkar Min Maung; Nyein Chan Kyaw; Aye Myat Thu
- Cinematography: Tint Sann
- Edited by: Chan Thar
- Music by: Pe Kabar Nyein Chan
- Production companies: Udan Pictures; Gemini Media Productions
- Release date: 9 September 2016 (United States)
- Running time: 120 minutes
- Country: Myanmar
- Language: Burmese

The Gemini (Burmese: မေထုံရာသီဖွား) is a 2016 Burmese drama film directed by Nyo Min Lwin, starring Okkar Min Maung, Nyein Chan Kyaw and Aye Myat Thu. The film follows a love story between two men who had faced difficulties in their life after one had been forced into an arranged marriage. The film was the first LGBTQ film in cinema of Myanmar and openly railed against the Burmese homosexuality laws.

The Gemini premiered at the Cinema Village in New York City on 9 September 2016, and became the first Burmese film shown in Hollywood.

== Plot ==
The film begins with a scene of bed sheets pooling on the floor and two men swinging their legs into view. The film cuts to a cold discussion between Thit Wai and his wife, Honey Pyo. Later, Honey Pyo is shattered when she learns that her husband's plane has crashed.

Nay Thit approaches the young widow at the funeral claiming to be his college friend. Flashbacks reveal the romantic relationship between Thit Wai and Nay Thit, and Honey Pyo suspects her late husband is with Nay Thit, which she decides to investigate.

== Cast ==
- Okkar Min Maung as Thit Wai
- Nyein Chan Kyaw as Nay Thit
- Aye Myat Thu as Honey Pyo

== Release and international showing ==
The film was first shown on 9 June 2016 at the Cinema Village in New York and shown on Laemmle Theatre in Los Angeles on 23 September 2016. The film was screened in Myanmar on 2 December 2016.

== See also ==
- LGBTQ rights in Myanmar
