= Nyein Chan Kyaw =

Burmese actor and writer

- ငြိမ်းချမ်းကျော်
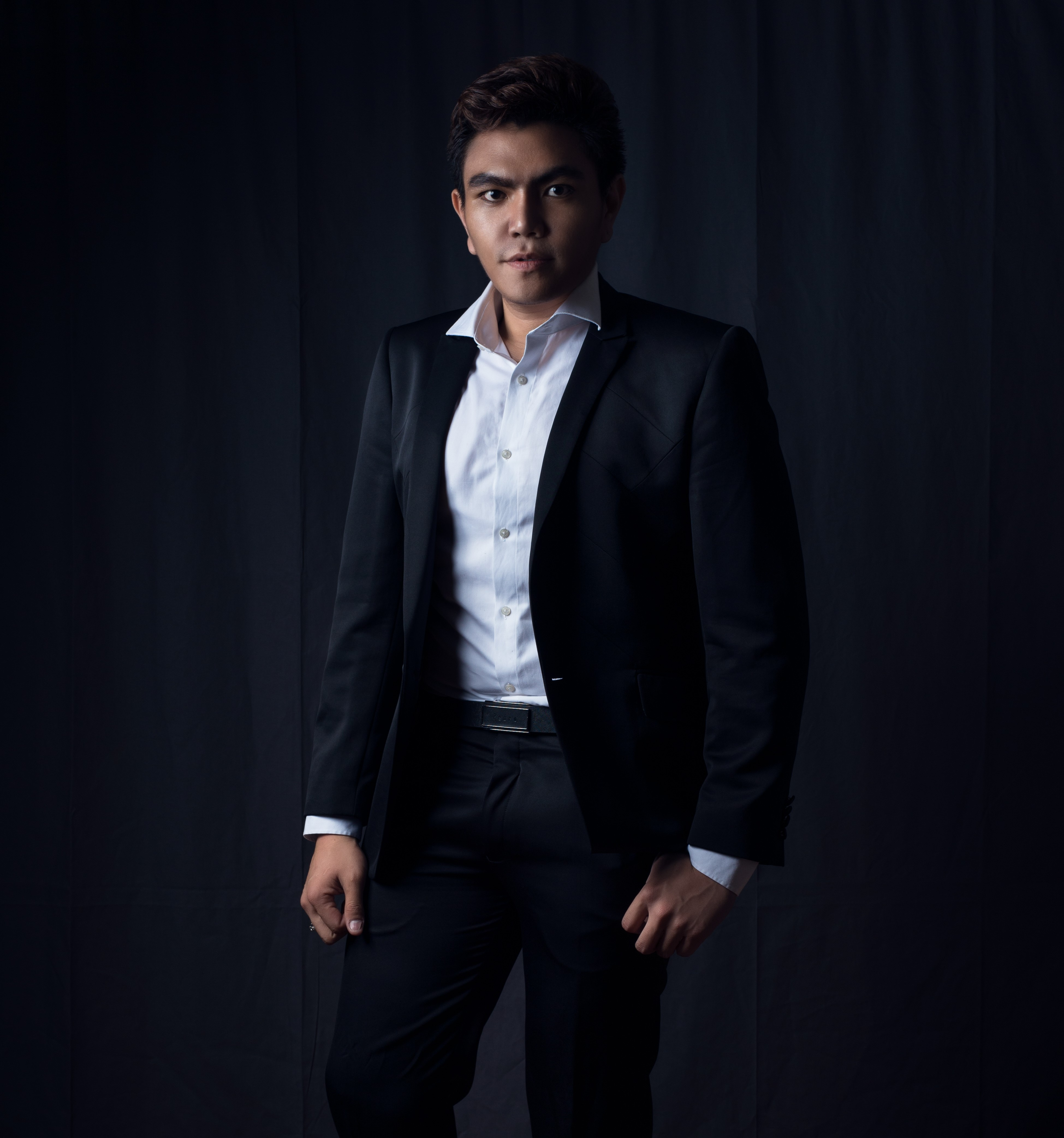
- Born: July 25, 1982 (age 44); Mandalay, Burma
- Education: Myanmar Institute of Theology
- Occupations: Actor, Writer
- Years active: 2015–present
- Height: 6 ft 0 in (1.83 m)
- Awards: New York Movie Awards 2020

Nyein Chan Kyaw (Burmese: ငြိမ်းချမ်းကျော်; born 25 July 1982) is a Burmese actor and writer. He has starred in several Burmese films and direct-to-videos, and best known for his role in the 2016 Burmese drama film The Gemini.

== Career ==
Nyein Chan Kyaw began acting in direct-to-videos, becoming widely noted for his role as Phoe Tar, a retarded boy, in 2015 direct-to-video Phoe Tar. In 2016, he starred his debut film The Gemini, the first LGBT-themed film in cinema of Myanmar, in which he played the role of a homosexual novelist.

Nyein Chan Kyaw has since acted in four other feature films, drama series and direct-to-videos. In 2019, he returned to acting with Myint Myat in Black Rose Mission (အယူတော်မင်္ဂလာ). He won the New York Movie Awards 2020, Best Actor for his role in 2020 film The Naked Ghost.

Nyein Chan Kyaw started his writing career in 2016 by his debut film, The Gemini. In 2020, he writes a horror screenplay The Vacant, in which he casts one of the main role, a century aged ghost clingy to the colonial-style manor.

== Filmography ==
Film
Year	Title	Role	Notes
2015	Who is your first Love?		Guest
2016	The Gemini	Nay Thit	
2019	Black Rose Mission	Monday	
2020	The Naked Ghost	Thant Sin	New York Movie Awards 2020 for best actor
TBA	The Vacant	Phoe Khin (Ghost)	Post-production

Direct-to-video
Year	Title	Role	Notes
2015	Phoe Tar	Phoe Tar	
2017	The Passion	Soe	
2017	My Dear Bro-in-law	Nyein Chan	
2018	Hopeless	Khit Thit	
2018	Tearful Evening	Lwin Maung	
2019	Let Alone Impossible	Maung Nyein	
2019	Vengeful Love	Khet Htan	
2020	Insurance	Shwe Pyae	
2020	Smart Game	Wai Yan	

Web television
Year	Title	Role	Channel
2019	Vow to Love You Forever	Aung Khant	La La Kyi
