= Ananda: Rise of Notra =

2018 Burmese Film

- Film Poster
- Burmese: အနန္တ
- Directed by: Nyo Min Lwin
- Screenplay by: Thar Htike; Htet Wai Yan Naing; Myat Thu Thway
- Story by: Nyo Min Lwin
- Produced by: Nyo Min Lwin
- Starring: Nan Su Oo; Phyo Ngwe Soe; Sai Hlwan; Soe Yan Aung; Thar Nyi; Akari Hmou Paing; Thet Htar Wai Zin
- Edited by: Michael Chan
- Music by: Choaus studio
- Production company: Night School Pictures
- Release date: July 4, 2019
- Running time: 135 minutes
- Country: Myanmar
- Language: Burmese

Ananda: Rise of Notra (Burmese: အနန္တ) is a 2019 Burmese science-fiction film, directed by Nyo Min Lwin starring Nan Su Oo, Phyo Ngwe Soe, Sai Hlwan, Soe Yan Aung, Thar Nyi, Akari Hmou Paing and Thet Htar Wai Zin. It was produced by Night School Production and premiered in Myanmar on July 4, 2019.

== Synopsis ==
Depending on the time and circumstances, nations may choose to live in a variety of new planets for their comfort. However, everyone's mutual goal is to reunite people who have been separated by unfortunate circumstances. The key to the reunification of all human beings is to explore a whole new world with the same function as the previous one.

== Cast ==
- Nan Su Oo as Dee Tah
- Phyo Ngwe Soe as Captain Lagoon
- Sai Hlwan as Major Agga
- Soe Yan Aung as Over
- Thar Nyi as Commander Saw Waldo
- Akari Hmou Paing as Captain Charcoal
- Thet Htar Wai Zin as Notra
