= Shin Thant =

Burmese LGBT activist (born 1990)

Ma Shin Thant
- ရှင်းသန့်
- Born: Aung Thant; 19 May 1990 (age 35); Mandalay, Myanmar
- Education: B. A (Business Science)
- Alma mater: Co-operative University, Thanlyin
- Occupations: LGBTQ+ rights activist, Human rights defender, Politician, Beauty queen (Miss Trans Grand International Myanmar 2018)
- Known for: leading LGBTQ+ rights activist in Myanmar

Shin Thant (Burmese: ရှင်းသန့်; born Aung Thant on 19 May 1990) is a Burmese LGBTQ+ rights activist, politician and human rights defender for LGBTQ+ people. She is one of the leading LGBTQ+ rights activists in Myanmar.

Shin Thant is also a beauty queen who won Miss Trans Grand International Myanmar 2018, a beauty pageant for transgender women.

== Early life and education ==
Shin Thant was born on 19 May 1990 in Mandalay, Myanmar to a traditional Buddhist family. Her birth name is Aung Thant (male name). She started identifying as a transgender woman when she was age 17. She graduated from Co-operative University, Thanlyin and holds a B.A. in Business Science and also studied business in Japan after receiving a government-paid scholarship. She publicly changed her gender identity from male to female in 2012.

== Activism and movements ==
In 2012, she was arrested under Section 35(c) of the Police Act. Soon after, Shin Thant meet with Aung Myo Min, an LGBTQ+ rights activist. Afterwards she sought out to speak out about the violence that Myanmar's LGBTQ+ community faces and to fight for her human rights. She started working with local LGBT rights organisations to fight for LGBT rights across Myanmar and became one of the leading LGBTQ+ activists in the country.

In 2013, when a group of transgender women were arrested in Mandalay and allegedly forced to strip before being taken into custody, Shin Thant worked with Colors Rainbow, a Myanmar LGBT rights organisation, to seek justice. In January 2017, she helped transgender model Myo Ko Ko San who was wrongly accused of being the administrator of the controversial Cele Cele Small Facebook page which reports celebrity gossip and rumours. In March 2017, Shin Thant also participated in a youth conference with State Counsellor of Myanmar Aung San Suu Kyi, in addition to her LGBT-focused activism. She had served as the Yangon Region's representative on the drafting committee on Myanmar Youth Policy.

Shin Thant believes that in order to achieve equality, the government should take responsibility for ensuring that LGBT people are represented in every sector. She hopes to become Myanmar's first openly LGBTQ+ member of the parliament by 2025 and is lobbying for the abolishing of Article 377 of Myanmar's Penal Code.

== See also ==
- LGBT rights in Myanmar
