= Nyo Min Lwin =

Burmese filmmaker

- ညိုမင်းလွင်
- Born: Nyo Min Lwin; 28 September 1979 (age 46); Yangon, Myanmar
- Education: University of Distance Education, Yangon
- Occupations: Film director, scriptwriter, actor
- Years active: 1998–present
- Parent(s): Aung Lwin; Khin Mya Thi

Nyo Min Lwin (Burmese: ညိုမင်းလွင်; born 28 September 1979) is a Burmese film director, scriptwriter and former actor. He is best known for directing the first Myanmar LGBT film The Gemini (2016) and the first Myanmar sci-fi film Ananda: Rise of Notra (2019). His career began as an actor in Burmese films and gained success as a director in the early days of his career by directing horror films. Throughout his career, he has acted in over 15 films and directed over 100 films.

== Early life and education ==
Nyo Min Lwin was born on 28 September 1979 in Yangon, Myanmar. He is the only son of Aung Win, a writer who wrote under the pen name Pike Htwe, and his wife Khin Mya Thi. He attended high school at Basic Education High School No. 6 Ahlone and also attended to Myanmar Motion Picture Organisation's Acting Class in 1998. He graduated from University of Distance Education, Yangon with a degree in Psychology in 2013.

== Career ==
He studied filmmaking when 15 years old. In 1998, he debuted as an actor in the television series Mayana Kone The. He has since appeared in many films. He wrote his first script in 1999 for the film Kyun Taw Chit Thaw Min Ma Myar. He then took a directing course under Academy winner director Mg Myo Min (Yin Twin Phyit) in 2000 before settling into the director's chair himself. He made his directorial debut in 2000 with the film Thein Mwei Sue (Delicated Thorn) in 2000. In 2002, he directed his first psychological thriller film Ein Mat Pya Dite (Dream Museum) was not exactly released. In 2006, he produced his first real ghost film Nya Kyaung (The Night School), a big hit with lovers of the genre. His first blockbuster film was Hninsi Ka Kyoe in 2014. In the same year, he directed his first big-screen film Datshin Yike Thu Myar.

In 2015, he directed the horror film The Loom, not only directed, but also took on a leading role in this film. The film has been shot entirely with an iPhone 6 and 6+, and an iPhone 5 and 5+ for the sound recording. He also used an iPad Air and a MacBook Pro for editing and an iPad Air to provide the background music. He used an iPhone 6+ for colour corrections and brought the movie up to the 4K resolution standard (4096 x 2160) to show it in local cinemas. The same year, he co-founded the Night School Pictures and Algebra VFX Studio.

In 2016, he directed the film The Gemini, was the first LGBT film in cinema of Myanmar and openly railed against the Burmese homosexuality laws. The film was screened in Myanmar cinemas on 2 December 2016 and also premiered at the Cinema Village in New York City on 9 September 2016, and became the first Burmese film shown in Hollywood. He also directed the first Myanmar sci-fi film Ananda: Rise of Notra, was screened in Myanmar cinemas on 11 July 2019.

In 2020, he directed the film Mya Mya, base on the true story of Mya Mya, a girl who was raped and murdered.

In 2022, he directed the film The Teacher (released in 2023), with the newcomer actors and actresses who were chosen by the audition.

== Selected filmography ==
=== As actor ===
Nyo Min Lwin starred in more than 10 films, including:

- Won Pa Lway Nya Thone Nar Yi (2009)
- Nya Tasay (2009)
- Nga Main Ma Ko Chauk Tae Tasay (2013)
- Ta Ma Lon (2013)
- Di Nya Lar Mae (2014)
- Yay Khae Tit Tar (2015)
- The Loom (2015)
- Kunlong Rak 40 (ကွမ်းလုံရက်၄၀; 2017)
- Sit Ko Mone Ywae Tite Khae Ti (2018)

=== Theatrical films ===
- Datshin Yike Thu Myar (2014)
- Lu Thar Myar Ko Chauk Lant Yan Tasay (2014)
- The Loom (2015)
- Ta Kaung Alo Shi The (2015)
- The Gemini (2016)
- Angel of Vengeance (2016)
- Ananda: Rise of Notra (2019)
- Mya Mya (2020)
- The Teacher (2022)
- Once Upon a Time in Yangon (2023)
- Min Doh Htwat Yat Yar Zar (upcoming)

=== Direct-to-video ===
Over 100 films, including:

- Thein Mwei Sue (2000)
- Nya Kyaung (2006)
- Won Pa Lway Nya Thone Nar Yi (2009)
- Nya Tasay (2009)
- Ta Ma Lon (2013)
- Nga Main Ma Ko Chauk Tae Tasay (2013)
- Di Nya Lar Mae (2014)
- Hninsi Ka Kyoe (2014)
- Lat Phwae Chin Thee Khan Par (2014)
- The Fridge (2015)
- The Wedding Night (2015)
- Ko Ko Ma Ngo Par Nae (2015)
- Yay Khae Tit Tar (2015)

== Personal life ==
Nyo Min Lwin married to Sandar Lwin in 2015. They have two daughters named Ye Yint Hninsi Lwin and Pantra Hninsi Lwin.
