= Desmond 'Dizzy' de Villiers =

British test pilot

Desmond ‘Dizzy’ de Villiers AFC
- Born: 7 November 1922
- Died: 19 June 1976 (aged 53)
- Military career
- Allegiance: United Kingdom
- Branch: Royal Air Force
- Service years: World War II
- Rank: Squadron Leader
- Awards: AFC
- Other work: Chief Test Pilot

Desmond ‘Dizzy' de Villiers AFC (7 November 1922 – 19 June 1976) was chief test pilot at de Havilland, the world's first open cockpit pilot to reach supersonic speed (albeit inadvertently, the cockpit canopy flew off mid-flight), the second British pilot to exceed mach 2, chief experimental test pilot on the English Electric Lightning programme (making more than 1,000 flights), and during his test career flew more than 6,000 hours in 130 different aircraft.

== Life ==
Desmond de Villiers was born on 7 November 1922 and educated at Bedford Modern School. During World War II he was a Squadron Leader in the Royal Air Force (with No. 68 Squadron RAF) and awarded the AFC. He principally flew Beaufighters in RAF Fighter Command and RAF Coastal Command.

In 1943, de Villiers was seconded to de Havilland where he became chief test pilot, the world's first open cockpit pilot to reach supersonic speed (albeit inadvertently, the cockpit canopy flew off mid-flight and landed in the garden of a house in Blundellsands near Southport), the second British pilot to exceed mach 2, chief experimental test pilot on the English Electric Lightning programme (making more than 1,000 flights) and who, during his test career, flew more than 6,000 hours in 130 different aircraft. In 1951, de Villiers flew the Mamba Marathon at the Farnborough Airshow.

De Villiers retired from test flying in 1967. He died on 19 June 1976.
