= Okkar Min Maung =

Burmese actor, model, and male beauty pageant titleholder

- ဥက္ကာမင်းမောင်
- Born: Ye Htoo Win; 18 September 1985 (age 41); Rangoon, Burma
- Education: Berkeley College
- Occupations: Actor, model, singer
- Height: 5 ft 10 in (1.78 m)
- Beauty pageant titleholder
- Title: Mr.Tourism Myanmar 2016
- Years active: 2004–present
- Hair color: Black
- Eye color: Brown
- Major competitions: Mr.Tourism World Myanmar 2016 (Winner); Mr. Tourism World 2016 (Winner)

Okkar Min Maung (Burmese: ဥက္ကာမင်းမောင်; born Ye Htoo Win on 18 September 1985) is a Burmese actor, model, singer and male pageant winner who was crowned Mr. Tourism World 2016 in Manila, the Philippines.

He has starred in leading roles in a slew of local productions, from commercials to films, and has catwalked for several fashion events.

== Early life and education ==
Okkar was born on 18 September 1985 in Yangon, Myanmar to parents Khine Win and Nilar Thein Myint and moved to New York when he was 24. He graduated in English from a Myanmar university and has another degree in Business Administration Management from Berkeley College.

== Career ==
Okkar started his acting career at age 18 and has starred in over 40 films. He modeled for fashion shows, numerous magazines, and billboards until 2008. After an eight-year gap in his acting career, he returned to the movie industry with Burma's first LGBT film, The Gemini, where he played in the leading role as Thit Wai in 2016.

In 2016, he won a Mister Tourism World Myanmar 2016 and represented Myanmar at the Mister Tourism World 2016, an international male beauty pageant.

On 10 December 2016, he competed in Mister Tourism World 2016 which was held in Manila, Philippines. At the end of the event, he became the winner and also won three continental titles for Social Media Icon, Best in Style & Fashion, and Best in Tourism Speaker.

== Personal life ==
In 2018, Okkar Min Maung shared his sexuality with the public, which was previously kept private.

== Filmography ==
=== Film ===
- Over 40 films

=== Film (Big Screen Movies) ===
Year	English title	Burmese title	Role	Notes
2006	Shwe-Moe-Thae	ရွှေမိုးသည်း	Bee Gar	Leading Role
^{2016}	The Gemini	မေထုံရာသီဖွား	Thit Wai	Leading role
2018	Wat-Wat-Kwel-Aung-Pwint	ဝက်ဝက်ကွဲအောင်ပွင့်	Min Min	Supporting role
2024	VENGEANCE	မရဲ့အေးခဲသွားကြသူများ	Min Thike	Leading role
