= Myo Minn Soe =

Burmese fashion designer

Thudhamma Mani Zawtadaya Myo Minn Soe
- မျိုးမင်းစိုး
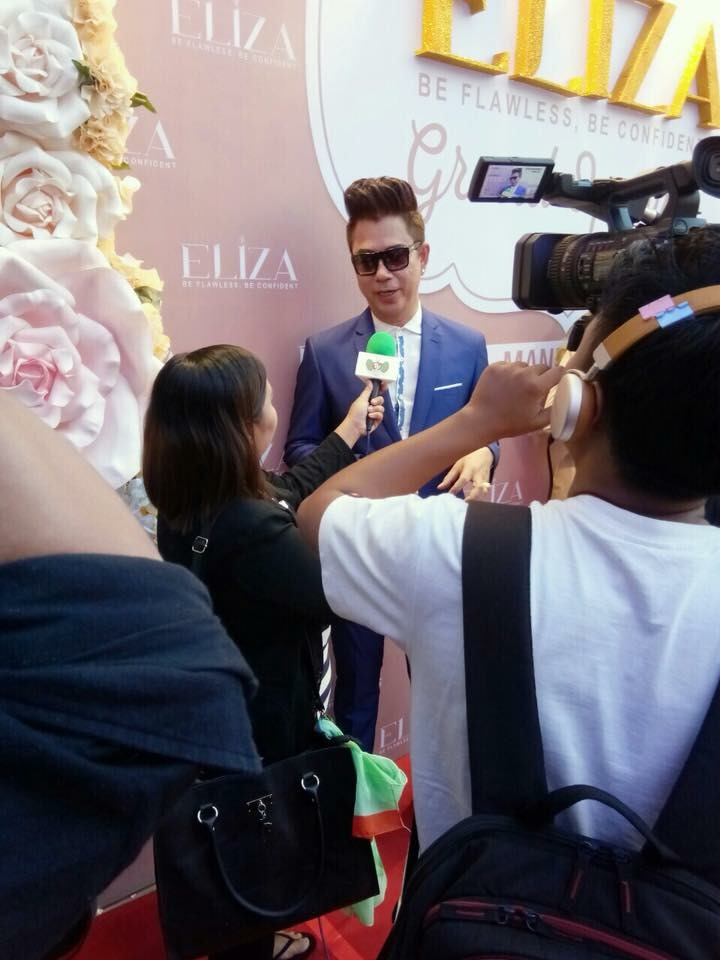
- Myo Minn Soe at the ELIZA event
- Born: June 12, 1976 (age 50); Mandalay, Myanmar
- Other name: မာမီစိုး
- Education: Yadanabon University
- Occupation: Fashion designer
- Years active: 2007–present
- Parent(s): Aye Maung; Tin Tin Mar

Thudhamma Mani Zawtadaya Myo Minn Soe (Burmese: မျိုးမင်းစိုး, also spelt Myo Min Soe; born 12 June 1976) is a Burmese fashion designer with a decade-long experience in the Myanmar fashion industry. He is best known for his extraordinary designs incorporating gold, rubies, diamonds, jewels.

Myo Min Soe was awarded the medal of honor and title Thudhamma Mani Zawtadaya by President of Myanmar on 4 January 2019 for his exemplary donation and honourable sacrifices.

== Early life and education ==
Myo Minn Soe was born on 12 June 1976 in Mandalay, Myanmar to parent Aye Maung and his wife Tin Tin Mar. His mother Tin Tin Mar is a tailor who worked from home, showed him how to make clothes from a young age, and he quickly became hooked. At that time, fashion designer did not mean much in Myanmar, they were usually called tailors. He is the eldest son of three siblings, having a younger sister and a younger brother.

Myo attended high school at Basic Education High School No. 16 Mandalay and graduated with Math from distance education at Yadanabon University in 2005. While still in university, he worked in fashion shop and study fashion.

== Career and fashion shows ==
Since he graduated from university, he started study to fashion design and becoming a designer. He rising to fame when he designs were featured in a group fashion show and he attracted the attention of local fashion magazines. He has flourished as a fashion designer since 2007. He opened "Myo Minn Soe Design House", a work space and showcase for his silk and acheik designs. Myo’s filigree work is popular in Myanmar and his creations range from K700,000 to K4 million over.

Myo was selected to represent Myanmar at 2013 Bangkok International Fashion Week, 2014 Chiangmai Fashion Week, 2014 Nathern Logistic Fair, 2015 Hong Kong Fashion Week and many other international fashion festivals. A creator, he was showcased in over 120 fashion shows both locally and internationally. Myo will over 10 year design costumes sponsored for Myanmar Academy Awards Ceremony and Academy Shwekyos, who will carry the golden trophies presented to Myanmar film Academy Award winners.

He also takes part in fashion contests as a judge. As a well-respected designer, his designs are a staple in national fashion events. He believes in supporting other young designers, so he has created a scholarship which is promoting new talent. He is planning to publish his designer life experiences.

On 17 July 2018, Myo presented his fashion collection of 10 Htaingmathein at My Dream, Sedona wedding fair, in Yangon. He currently serves as a visiting professor at National University of Arts and Culture, Mandalay and teaching costume design.

== Expensive creation ==
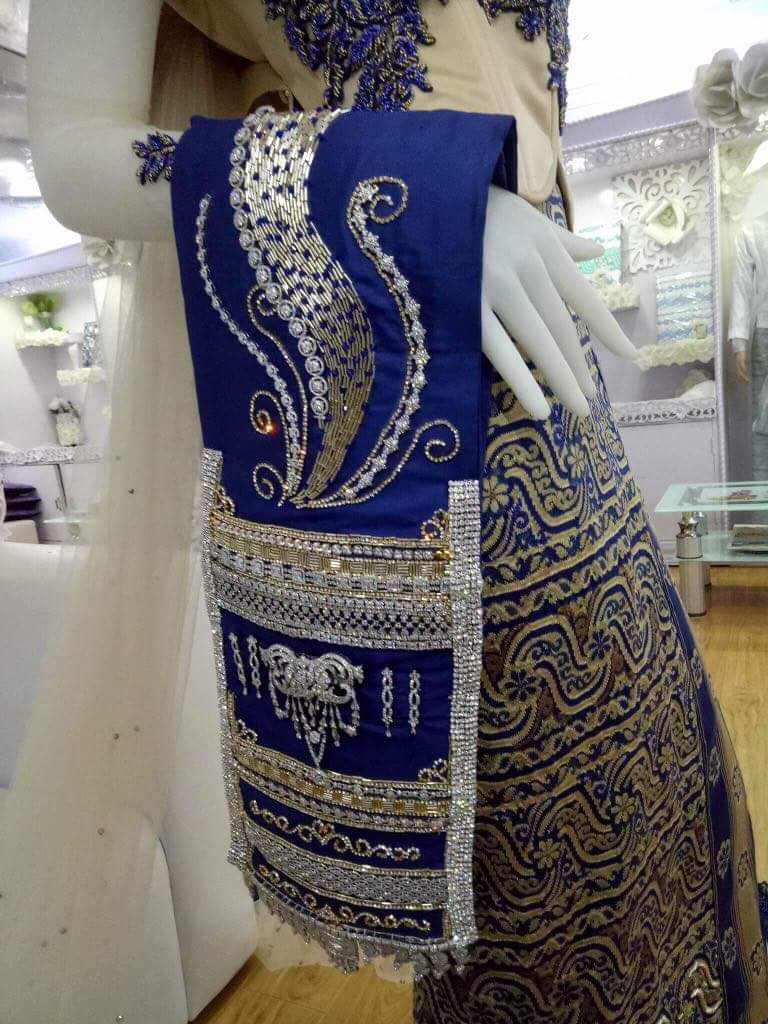
Myo Minn Soe's diamond shawl

His creations that are made of gold, diamonds, and jewelry. One of which is a diamond shawl worth of over US$300000.

In 2017, he created expensive "golden dress" for actress Ei Chaw Po.
