= Butyn, Russia =

Butyn Бутынь
- Village
- Location within Moscow Oblast Location within Russia
- Coordinates: 55°39′59″N 36°56′37″E
- Country: Russia
- Region: Moscow Oblast
- District: Odintsovsky District
- Time zone: UTC+3:00

Butyn (Russian: Бутынь) is a rural locality (a hamlet) in Odintsovsky District, Moscow Oblast, Russia.

The hamlet is in the west of the town Golitsyno, Moscow Oblast. The town formerly had 'scribbled over' sections in satellite imagery used for Google Maps.

== Notable people ==
Butyn was the birthplace of Russian opposition leader Alexei Navalny.
