= Sergey Afanasyev =

Sergey Afanasyev may refer to:

- Sergey Afanasyev (engineer) (1918–2001), Soviet engineer and space and defense industry executive
- Sergey Afanasyev (athlete) (born 1964), Russian middle-distance runner, in 1989 European Athletics Indoor Championships
- Sergey Afanasyev (racing driver) (born 1988), Russian racing driver
