= Andrey V. Kuznetsov =

Russian-American mechanical engineer

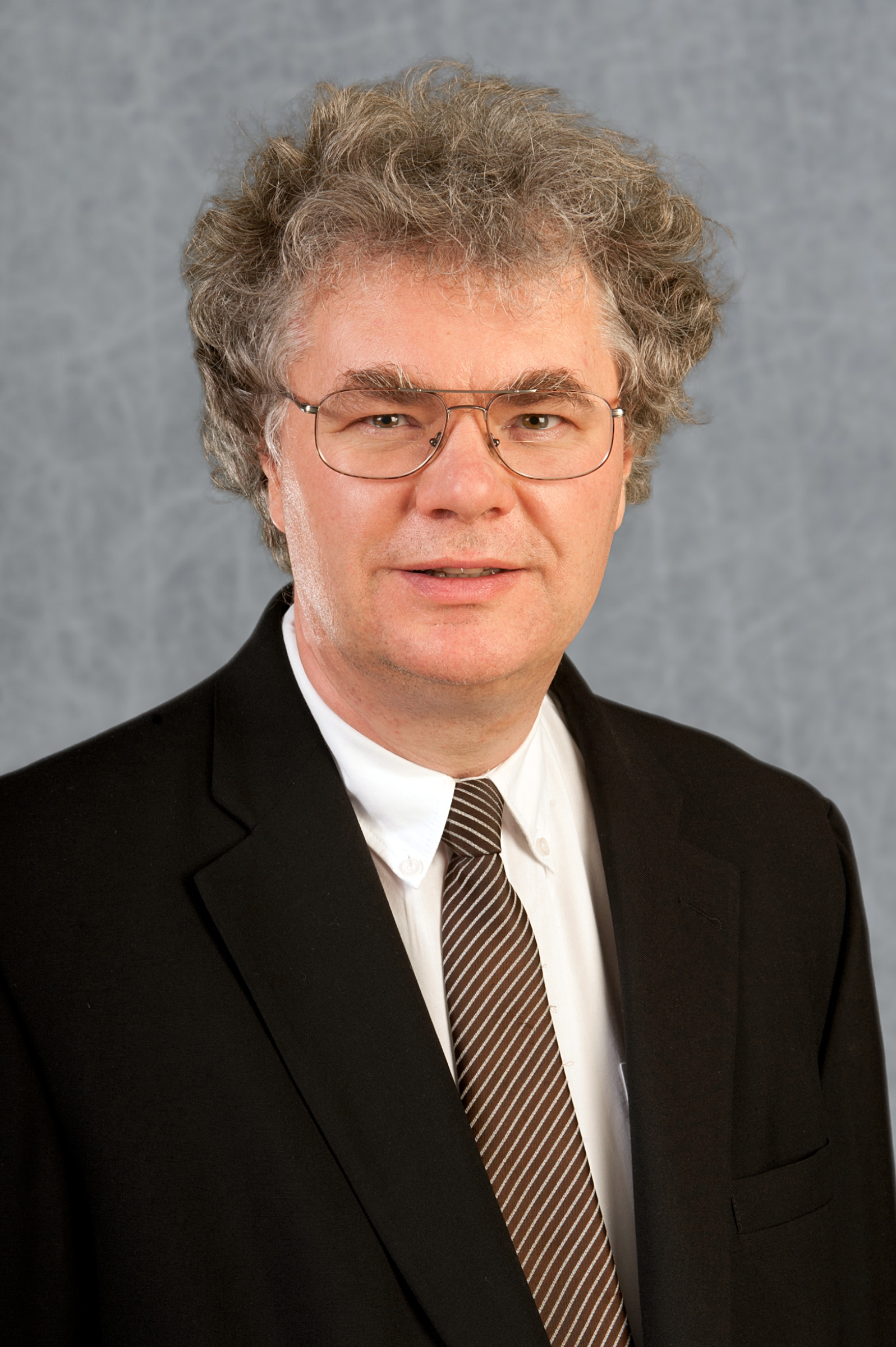
- Andrey Kuznetsov in 2019
- Born: Andrey Valerevich Kuznetsov; Magadan, Russia
- Education: Bauman Moscow State Technical University; Lomonosov Moscow State University; Russian Academy of Sciences
- Known for: Heat and mass transfer; porous media; nanofluids; bioconvection
- Awards: ASME Fellow; Humboldt Research Award
- Scientific career
- Fields: Mechanical engineering
- Workplaces: North Carolina State University
- Website: www.mae.ncsu.edu/people/avkuznet/

Andrey Valerevich Kuznetsov is a Russian-American mechanical engineer and professor in the Department of Mechanical and Aerospace Engineering at North Carolina State University. His research is in thermal sciences, fluid mechanics, porous media, nanofluids, bioconvection, and mathematical modeling in biological systems.

== Education and career ==
Kuznetsov received a master's degree in mechanical engineering from Bauman Moscow State Technical University in 1988 and a master's degree in applied mathematics from Lomonosov Moscow State University in 1990. He earned a Ph.D. in mechanical engineering from the Mechanical Engineering Research Institute of the Russian Academy of Sciences in 1992.

He joined North Carolina State University in 1998 and is a professor in its Department of Mechanical and Aerospace Engineering. He background as a Russian-American helps him to provide his students with real-life examples of heat transfer problems, like the Salyut 7 Rescue Mission, where the Cosmonauts timed how long it took for spit to freeze in order to measure the temperature in the station.

== Research ==
Kuznetsov's research has addressed convection and heat transfer in porous media, nanofluid transport, bioconvection, and biological transport modeling. He has also co-edited academic books on heat transfer, fluid flow, and transport processes in biological media.

== Awards and honors ==
- Fellow, American Society of Mechanical Engineers, 2009
- Humboldt Research Award, Alexander von Humboldt Foundation, 2013
