= Trefilov =

Trefilov (Russian: Трефилов) is a Russian masculine surname, its feminine counterpart is Trefilova. It may refer to

- Andrei Trefilov (born 1969), Russian ice hockey goaltender and a sports agent
- Dmitrijs Trefilovs (born 1987), Latvian gymnast
- Georgy Trefilov (born 1971), Russian businessman
- Natalia Trefilova (born 1971), Russian swimmer
- Vera Trefilova (1875–1943), Russian dancer
- Vladimir Trefilov (born 1949), Russian scholar
- Yevgeni Trefilov (born 1955), Russian handball coach
