= Win Thapyay Tun =

Burmese dancer and actress

Win Tha Pyay Tun
- ဝင်းသပြေထွန်း
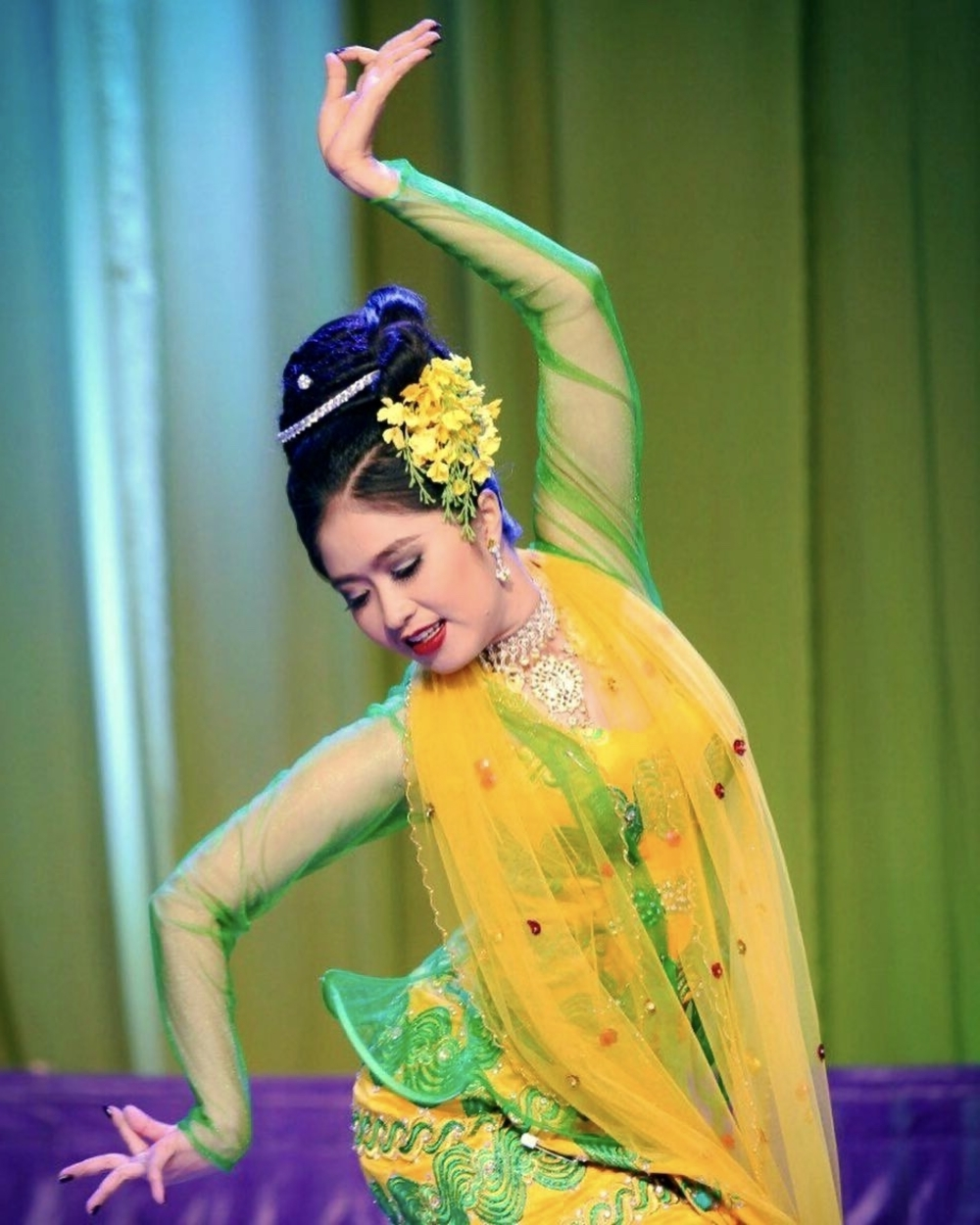
- Win Tha Pyay Tun performs traditional Burmese dance
- Born: May Ki Ki Tun; 30 June 1985 (age 41); Mandalay, Burma
- Other name: Ki Ki
- Education: State School of Fine Arts, Mandalay
- Occupations: Traditional dancer, actress
- Years active: 2005–present
- Height: 5 ft 0 in (1.52 m)
- Parent(s): Khayan Win Tun; Myanmar Malay Thapyay
- Relatives: R Yone Oo (brother)

Win Tha Pyay Tun (Burmese: ဝင်းသပြေထွန်း; born May Ki Ki Tun on 30 June 1985) is a prominent Burmese traditional anyeint dancer and actress. She has performed over 300 dance concerts in Myanmar and 17 overseas countries. In 2015, she received a gold medal from Bauman University from Russia and was presented an honorary cultural award from the Russia Federation.

== Early life and family ==
Win Tha Pyay Tun was born on 30 June 1985 in Mandalay, Myanmar. She comes from the traditional thabin family, all of her family member are traditional anyeint dancers and actors. Her grandparents are also anyeint dancers. Her father Khayan Win Tun, a retired anyeint dancer and her mother Myanmar Malay Thapyay, a retired anyeint dancer and vocal coach at the State School of Fine Arts, Mandalay. Her younger brother R Yone Oo, is also an anyeint dancer. She graduated from the State School of Fine Arts, Mandalay.

== Career ==
After graduated, she worked as an officer at the Department of Culture, Mandalay for four years. Afterwards, she debuted as an anyeint dancer in her mother's anyeint concerts. She performed as a lead dancer in the Shumawa anyeint for two years. And then, she founded the anyeint troupe Shwe Maung Nama (The Golden Siblings) together with her younger brother. She has flourished as an anyeint dancer since 2005. Her first international concert was in Mexico. Throughout her career, she has performed over 300 dance concerts in the local and 17 countries.

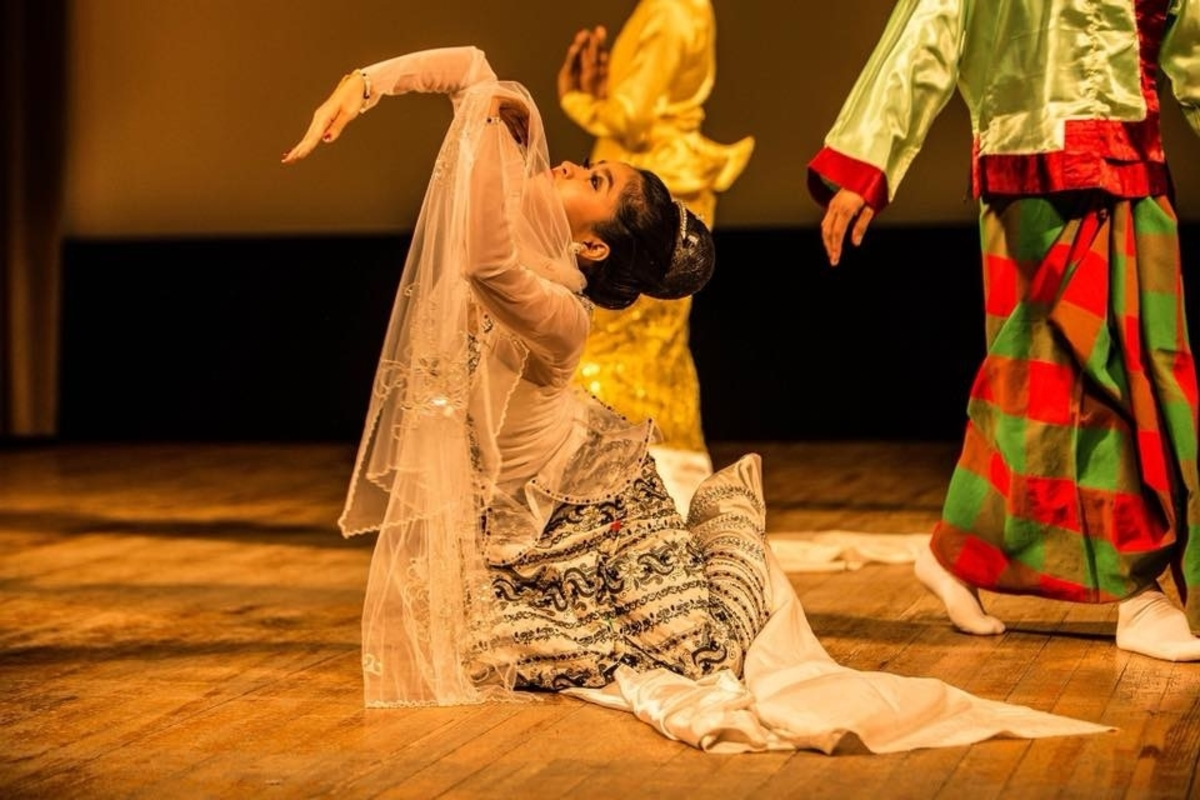
Win Tha Pyay Tun performs traditional dance in Anyeint

Win Tha Pyay Tun made guest appearances in film Koe Se Sa Thar Laint Me in 2007. She then starred in television series Ywar Ma Gyi, aird on Myawaddy TV in 2009. Her hard work as a dancer and supporting roles in films was noticed by the film industry and soon, film casting offers came rolling in. In 2010, She made her leading role debut in the film Ta Bawa San, alongside June Ko. She has since starred in big-screen films Naung Twin Au Htan Twin Say Ta Dee, screened in 2018 and Thaung Tike Ka Kyar Say Thar, screened on 30 January 2020.

In 2019, she starred in thriller film Mya Mya, playing a girl whose body entered by Mya Mya's spirit. The film was premiered in Myanmar cinemas on 6 February 2020 and became one of highest-grossing films in Myanmar.

== Filmography ==
=== Film (Cinema) ===
- Koe Se Sa Thar Laint Me (ကိုးဆယ်ဆသာလိမ့်မယ်) (2007)
- Naung Twin Au Htan Twin Say Ta Dee (နောင်တွင် ဥဒါန်းတွင်စေသတည်း) (2018)
- Thaung Tike Ka Kyar Say Thar (သောင်းတိုက်ကကြားစေသား) (2020)
- Mya Mya (မြမြ) (2020)

=== Film ===
Over 10 films, including

- Ta Bawa San (တစ်ဘဝစံ) (2010)
- Tu Thaw Akyoe (တူသောအကျိုး) (2012)
- Atwin Sate (အတွင်းစိတ်) (2012)
- Latt Ma Yount (လက်မရွံ့) (2015)
- Yarzawin Aoe (ရာဇဝင်အိုး) (2016)
- BSA Moe Kaung and Bicycle Thar Gi (ဘီအက်စ်အေမိုးကောင်းနှင့် ဘိုင်စကယ်သာဂိ) (2017)

=== Television series ===
Year	English title	Myanmar title	Role	Network	Notes
2009	Ywar Ma Gyi	ရွာမကြီး	Main role	Myawaddy TV	
