= Vasiliy Tairov =

Armenian viticulturist

Vasiliy Egorovich Tairov
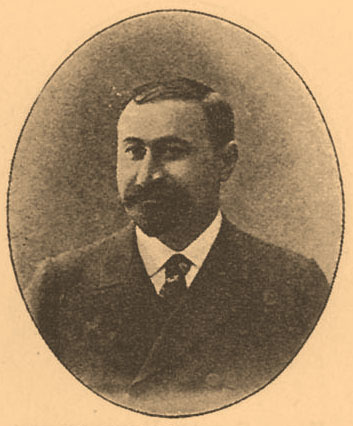
- Tairov between 1890 and 1907
- Born: November 1, 1859; Karakilisa, Russian Empire
- Died: April 23, 1936 (aged 76); Odesa, Ukrainian SSR
- Known for: Winemaking

Vasiliy Egorovich Tairov (or Vasyl or Vasil; 1859–1938) was a Soviet and Armenian viticulturist and scientist. After studying winemaking in France, he and his cousin Nerses Tairan opened the first brandy factory in Armenia. Tairov founded the Winemaking Bulletin, a journal, in Odessa, Ukraine in 1892. In 1905, he founded what would become the V.Ye. Tairov Institute of Viticulture and Winemaking. It was the first scientific winemaking institution in Odessa. A memorial in his honor was erected in Odessa to celebrate his 185th birthday.

== Early life and education ==
Tairov was born on 20 October 1859 (Old Style) / 2 November 1859 (New Style) in the municipality of Karakilisa (now the city of Vanadzor, Armenia). He was the fifth of six children, and had four brothers and one sister. His family name was originally Tairian. When Tairov was eight years old, he went to a local school in his village, then was taken to Yerevan by his aunt for further education when he turned ten. He graduated from Yerevan Classical High School in 1875, then from Tbilisi Real School in 1878.

In 1878, Tairov enrolled in the Imperial Moscow Technical School, but left after only one year. He graduated from the Petrovsky Academy of Agriculture and Forestry in 1884, specialising in forestry. He presented a dissertation on wood vinegar, but subsequently turned his attention to viticulture.

Tairov became a member of the Department of Agriculture and Agricultural Industry of the Scientific Committee of the Ministry of State Property in 1885.

From 1885 to 1887, Tairov travelled to Western Europe to learn the processes of winemaking. He studied at the Federal College of Viticulture and Pomology in Klosterneuburg, Austria, under viticulturist August Wilhelm von Babo, as well as at the Istituto Agrario di San Michele all’Adige under von Babo's associate Edmund Mach. He also studied at the Geisenheim Grape Breeding Institute under Swiss botanist Hermann Müller-Thurgau, and in the laboratories of German chemist Carl Remigius Fresenius in Wiesbaden, Germany under Eugen Borgman, where Tairov performed his first analyses of wines from the Yerevan and Kakheti regions. He also visited some other institutions in Switzerland and Northern Italy. In early 1887, Tairov moved to Montpellier, France, to study at the National School of Agriculture of Montpellier, headed by French viticulturist Gustave Foëx, where he continued to research the wines of his home regions, while also visiting the wine-growing regions of France to learn more about viticulture.

== Career ==
In 1888, Tairov returned to the Ministry of State Property. His work there included determining measures to improve the winemaking industry in the country. At the time, Phylloxera insects were a significant issue plaguing vineyards in what is now Ukraine, which Tairov worked to combat by convincing the Ministry of Agriculture to introduce techniques he had learned in Western Europe, such as grafting American vines with Phylloxera-resistant rootstock. In 1892, Tairov founded the Winemaking Bulletin journal in Odesa, the centre of the largest winegrowing region in Ukraine, which he used to further combat grape diseases by allowing subscribers to send him samples which he could then test.

Another significant viticultural issue in the Russian Empire during this time was wine fraud. As part of his work with the Ministry of State Property and the Winemaking Bulletin journal from 1899 to 1901, Tairov consulted with law professors from Novorossiysk University and other specialists to develop provisions for a draft bill to combat fraud of food products, including wine, by adulteration. The final version of the bill was signed into law by Tsar Nicholas II in 1914, and provided the first official definition of the term "wine" in Russian law, as well as official definitions of wine quality.

Additional responsibilities that Tairov worked on during this time included determining the taxation of wines in Russia by excise and (from 1908 onwards) collecting annual statistics from all the wine-growing regions of Russia, to be published in the Bulletin.

In 1899, Tairov proposed the development of a winemaking institute in the Bulletin, and formed a committee to do so in 1903. With the support of the municipal government of Odesa, the institute was established at the city's New Bazaar on February 5, 1905. It was originally known as the Wine-Making Station of Russian Grape Growers and Winemakers, and its mandate was to research grapevine diseases, conduct soil analyses for winegrowers, investigate the chemistry of wine, and develop new methods of viticulture and winemaking. With a gift of 5 acres (2.0 hectares) of land on the Sukhyi Estuary in 1909 from two landowners, the institute expanded and built an experimental demonstration vineyard and winery on the new site. By 1917, the institute had become a fully-developed scientific institute, with departments of microbiology, chemistry, and phytopathology of wine, and the institute was renamed the V.Ye.Tairov Institute of Viticulture and Winemaking after him in 1922.

Following the Russian Revolution, the institute fell under the control of the new Soviet government. Tairov was investigated and fired from his position as head of the institute in 1926. He was officially reinstated in 1936, but due to a combination of declining health and the memory of how he had been treated, he became a consultant with the institute instead.

Tairov died on April 23, 1938. He is buried in Odessa 2nd Christian Cemetery.

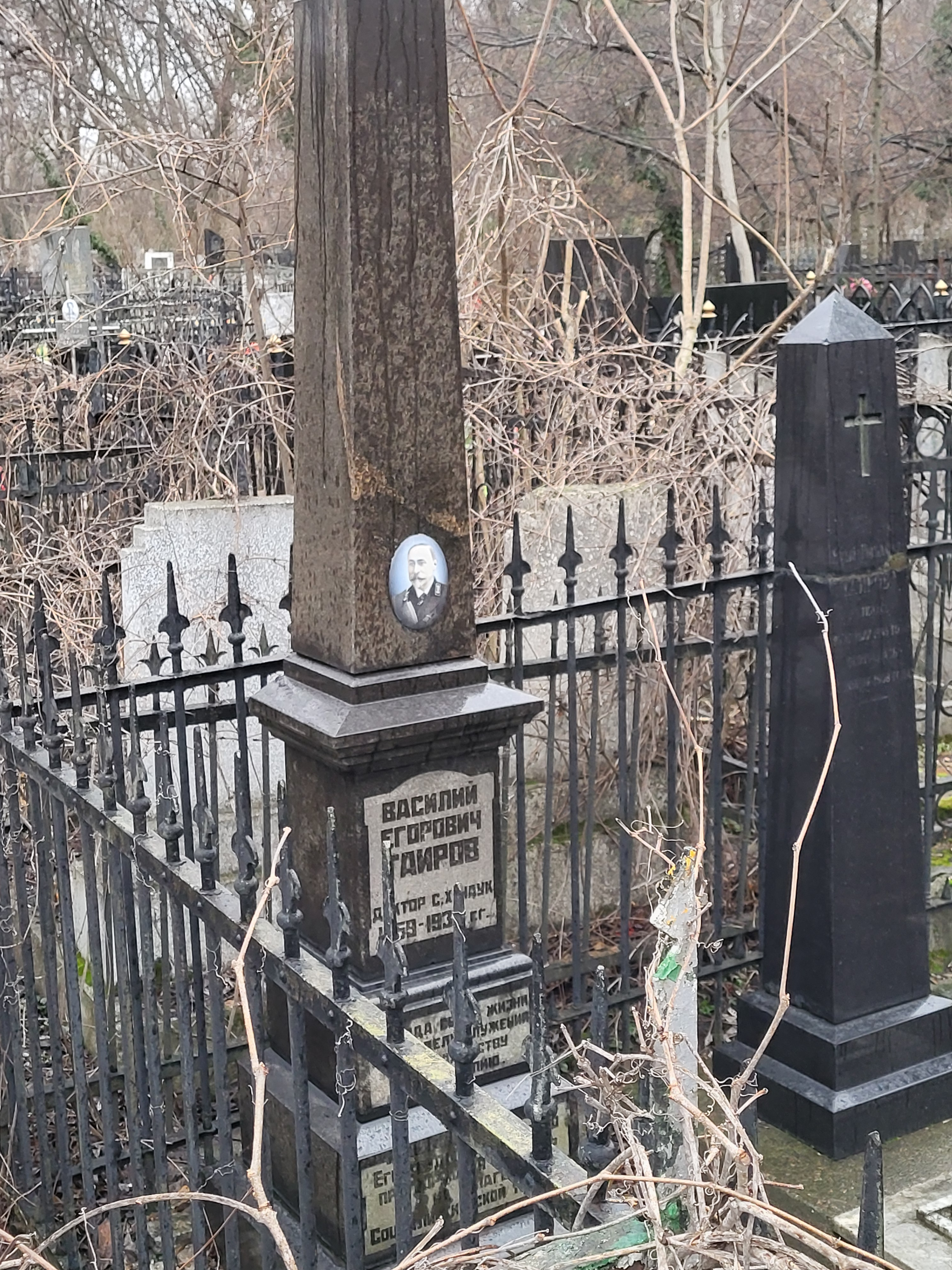
Vasiliy Tairov grave
