= Vladimir Uzhva =

Russian educator (born 1950)

- Born: April 18, 1950; Riga, Latvia
- Occupation: Vice-rector at National Research Nuclear University MEPhI

Vladimir Vasilievich Uzhva (Russian: Владимир Васильевич Ужва; born 18 April 1950) is a Russian educator, currently employed as Vice-rector at National Research Nuclear University MEPhI.

== Education ==
Vladimir Uzhva graduated from Bauman MSTU in 1973, earning diploma with honours in the field of Mechanics and Construction. In 1978 he received a PhD degree in Technical science.

== Professional career ==
Vladimir Uzhva started his academic career in 1973 as research assistant in Bauman Moscow State Technical University. In 1978 he joined the faculty of Moscow State University of Mechanical Engineering (MAMI), where he worked as a research assistant, senior lecturer and docent. Between 1985 and 1989 he was assigned as a lecturer in Algeria. In 1994 he was appointed as Dean of Pre-university faculty. Between 1999 and 2015 he held several administrative positions in MAMI, including:

- Vice-rector on Pre-university Education (1999–2002)
- Vice-rector on Educational Affairs (2002–2008)
- First Vice-rector (2008–2015)

Since 2015 he works as Vice-rector of National Research Nuclear University MEPhI. During his scientific and administrative career Vladimir Uzhva published more than 50 scientific papers and study guides.

== Awards ==
Vladimir Uzhva was awarded the Medal "In Commemoration of the 850th Anniversary of Moscow" and title “Honoured Worker of Higher Education of the Russian Federation”.
