= Mya Mya =

2020 Burmese horror film

- Film poster
- Burmese: မြမြ
- Directed by: Nyo Min Lwin
- Written by: Thar Htike
- Produced by: Daw Sandar Lwin
- Starring: Thinzar Wint Kyaw; Min Taw Win; Dee Dee; Win Tha Pyay Tun
- Cinematography: Tint Hsan
- Edited by: Nyein Htike
- Production companies: Night School Film Production, Sein Htay Film Production
- Release date: February 6, 2020
- Running time: 100 minutes
- Country: Myanmar
- Language: Burmese

Mya Mya (Burmese: မြမြ) is a 2020 Burmese horror film starring Thinzar Wint Kyaw, Min Taw Win, Dee Dee, and Win Tha Pyay Tun. The film, produced by Night School Film Production and Sein Htay Film Production, premiered in Myanmar on February 6, 2020.

The character Mya Mya was based on the death of a feisty Yangon factory worker and strike-organiser before her death – from further humiliation is that, while haunting the men who raped and murdered her, she does not do so half-naked.

== Plot ==
The rape-revenge tale of Mya Mya was inspired by a viral Facebook video. The video features a young woman employed in a Yangon factory who, the viewer is invited to believe, is being possessed by the ghost of Mya Mya, a raped and murdered factory worker.

== Cast ==
- Thinzar Wint Kyaw as Mya Mya
- Min Taw Win as Thuta Min Myat
- Dee Dee as Ye Lwin
- Khin Htwe Su Hlaing as Hnin Si Aye
- Win Tha Pyay Tun as Khin Zarchi Lwin
- Myo Hlaing Win as Hla Thein, A Thein or Sein Gaw Li
- Lin Nay as Aung Ko Oo, Nga Oo or Aung Gyi
- Ko Sai as Kyaw Oo, Tayoke Gyi
