= Vladimir Zotikov =

Russian and Soviet scientist (1887–1970)

- Владимир Евгеньевич Зотиков
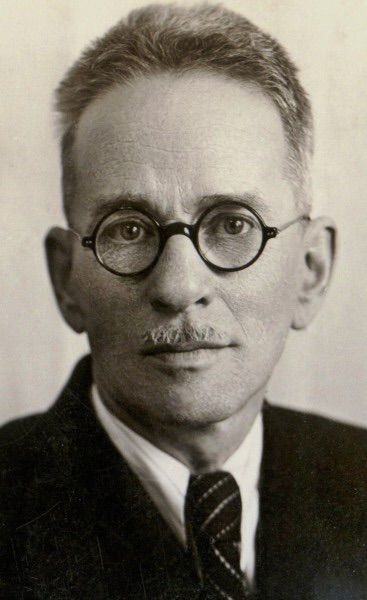
- Born: 23 January 1887; Yalta, Russian Empire
- Died: 12 November 1970 (aged 83); Moscow, Russian SFSR, Soviet Union
- Education: Imperial Moscow Technical School or IMTS
- Known for: Theory of cotton-spinning
- Awards: Order of Saint Stanislaus (House of Romanov) 3rd class (1915); Order of Saint Anna 3rd class (1915); Order of Saint Stanislaus (House of Romanov) 2nd class (1916); Order of Saint Anna 2nd class (1916); Medal "For the Defence of Moscow" (1944); Medal "For Valiant Labour in the Great Patriotic War 1941–1945" (1945); Medal "In Commemoration of the 800th Anniversary of Moscow" (1948); Order of Lenin (1953); Order of the Badge of Honour (1961)
- Scientific career
- Fields: Textile manufacturing
- Workplaces: Moscow Textile Institute

Vladimir Evgenievich Zotikov (Russian: Влади́мир Евге́ньевич Зо́тиков) (January 23 [O.S. January 10] 1887 – November 12, 1970) was a prominent Russian and Soviet scientist and textile engineer best known for having developed the theory of cotton-spinning. He devoted his life to the study and improvement of mechanical technology of fibrous materials.

== Life and work ==
Born in Yalta, Crimea, his parents were Evgeny Zotikov, a mechanical engineer, and Elizaveta Zotikova née Savitskaya. He was educated first at home, then studied at Moscow private Realschule (Реальное училище) and Imperial Moscow Technical School (1911). He then began working at the cotton-spinning factory of Ramenskoye, and by 1913 had become a master of spinning and was permitted to travel abroad to study textile machinery.

He died on 12 November 1970.

== Honors ==
Honored Worker of Science and Technology of RSFSR (1963).
