= Bauman Moscow State Technical University =

Public technical university (Polytechnic), Moscow, Russia

- Московский государственный технический университет им. Н. Э. Баумана
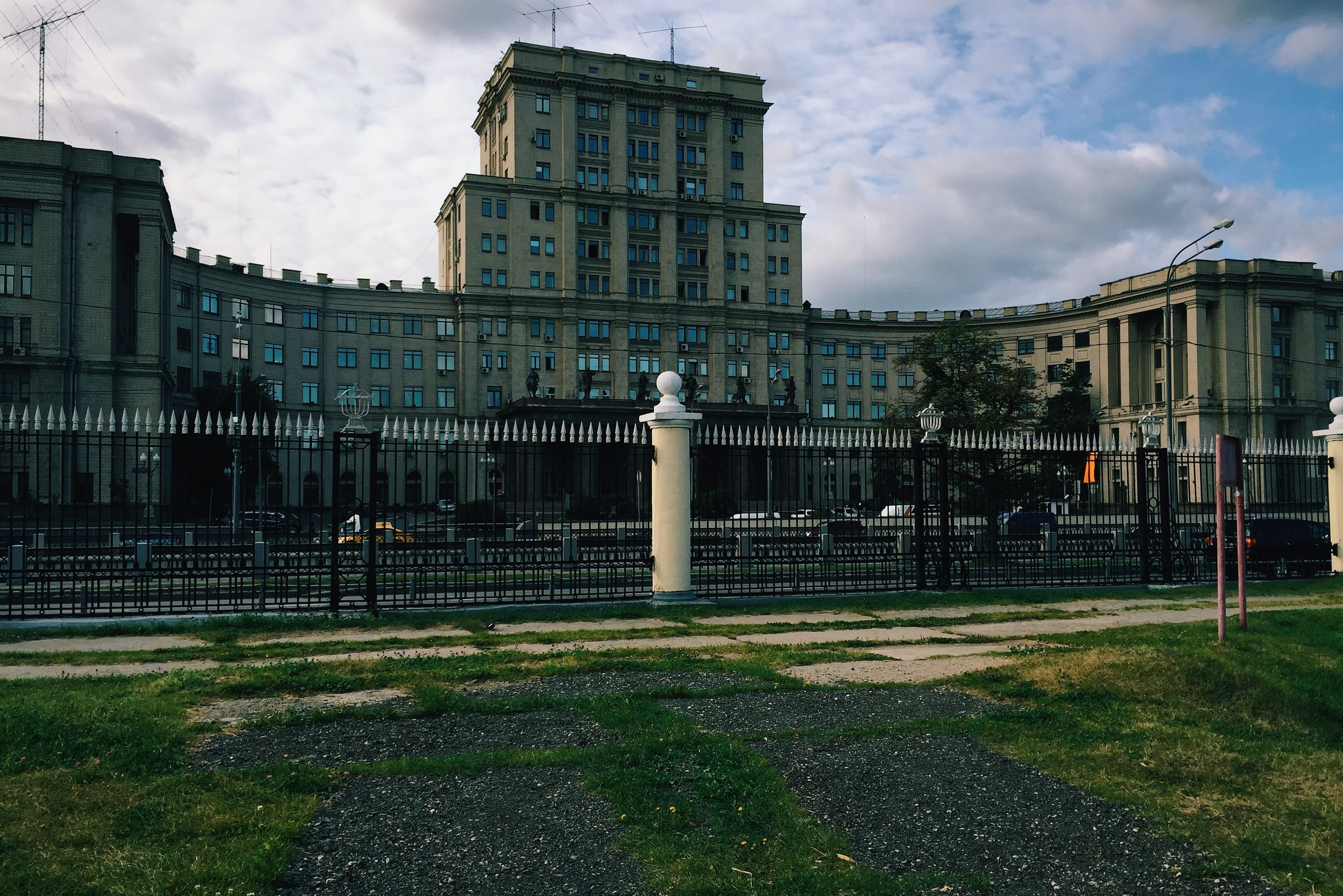
- Motto: «Мужество, Воля, Труд, Упорство!» "Courage, will, labor, perseverance!"
- Type: Public
- Established: 1830; 196 years ago
- President: Anatoly Aleksandrov
- Rector: Mikhail Gordin
- Faculty: 3,500
- Students: 19,000
- Postgraduates: 1,000
- Location: 2-nd Baumanskaya, 5, Moscow, 105005, Russia; 55°45′57″N 37°41′5″E
- Campus: Urban
- Website: www.bmstu.ru

University rankings

Global – Overall
- QS World: 320 (2026)
- USNWR Global: 1,758 (2023)

Regional – Overall
- QS Emerging Europe and Central Asia: 25 (2022)

The Bauman Moscow State Technical University (BMSTU; Russian: Московский государственный технический университет им. Н. Э. Баумана, МГТУ им. Н. Э. Баумана), sometimes colloquially referred as the Bauman School or Baumanka (Бауманка), is a public technical university (polytechnic) located in Moscow, Russia. Bauman University offers B.S., M.S & PhD degrees in various engineering fields and applied sciences. In 2023, US News & World Report ranked it #1,758 in the world.

== History ==
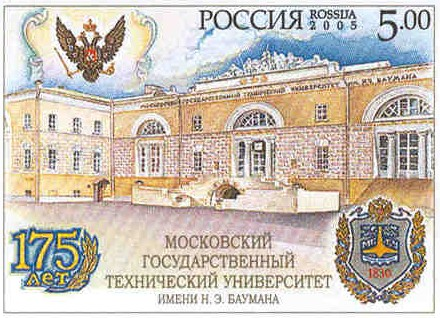
Russian anniversary postage stamp with the Main Building of the Bauman University, 2005

Bauman University is the second oldest educational institution in Russia after Lomonosov Moscow State University (1755). In 1763, the Russian Empress Catherine II founded the Educational Imperial House. On October 5, 1826, the dowager Empress Maria Feodorovna issued a decree to establish "great workshops for different crafts with bedrooms, a dining room, etc." as a part of the Moscow Foundling Home in the German Quarter. All craft pupils were moved from an Orphanage there. On July 1, 1830, Emperor Nicholas I approved the Statute of Moscow Craft School.

Russia's developing industry needed skilled labor in many trades with the aim of the new school being to train artisans with a theoretical background to improve and spread skills in various trades all over Russia. New schools were created to teach crafts as well as basic sciences. In 1868 MCS was reorganized into the Imperial Moscow Technical School (IMTS) under the directorship of Victor Della-Vos. The main purpose of IMTS was to "educate construction engineers, mechanical engineers and industrial technologists".

The IMTS was financially supported by the Government and industrialists. Its management was democratic. A key feature of the new institution was its educational system called the "Russian method", which unifies a broad and intensive theoretical preparation with a deep practical education closely connected with industries. The school participated in the Universal Exposition in 1873 in Vienna and the Philadelphia Centennial Exhibition of 1876. It proved to be influential on John Daniel Runkle when he introduced manual training alongside theoretical training at the Massachusetts Institute of Technology. It was also applied to other American technical universities. Many scientists taught in IMTS, such as D. Mendeleev, N. Jukovsky, P. Chebychev, S. Chaplygin, A. Yershov, D. Sovetkin, F. Dmitriev, A. Letnikov, A. Gavrilenko.

In the Soviet period IMTS was renamed Bauman Moscow Higher Technical School (BMHTS), after revolutionary Nikolay Bauman, who was killed near the building of this university. BMHTS continued education of engineers for machine and instrument building. In 1938, new military departments were created in MHTS such as tank, artillery, and ammunition. In 1948 a rocket department was added.

During the first half of the 20th century, Bauman University formed and founded more than 70 technical universities in the USSR. Some of them are now well known institutions, such as Moscow Aviation Institute, Moscow Power Engineering Institute, Moscow University of Civil Engineering, Moscow Chemical Institute, Moscow Communication and Informatics University, Central Aerohydrodynamics Institute TSAGI, and the Military Academy of Aviation Engineering Joukovski.

On 27 July 1989 USSR State committee for peoples education conferred on Moscow Higher Technical School a name of Bauman Moscow Technical University (BMSTU). BMSTU was honored to be the first Russian technical university. Nearly 200,000 students graduated from the university. Most of them chose to become scientists or engineers in leading research centers, universities, private and government owned companies. Many of government officials, chief designers, CEOs of big enterprises, and cosmonauts are Bauman graduates, as noted below in the alumni section.

Many Bauman University graduates are world-renowned: Sergei Korolev for the first satellite in space and first man and woman in space, Andrey Tupolev for the world first supersonic passenger plane, Nikolay Dollezhal for the world first civil nuclear plant, Vladimir Shukhov for the first method and the world first petrol cracking plant as well as for the first hyperboloid structures in architecture, Nikolay Zhukovsky for the foundation of aerodynamics and hydrodynamics sciences, Pavel Sukhoi for the foundation of Sukhoi Aerospace Design Bureau. Some of the specialized departments of BMSTU are located outside Moscow in cities of Moscow Oblast: Krasnogorsk (Russian: Красногорск), Reutov (Russian: Реутов), Korolyov (Russian: Королёв). There is also a large branch of the university in Kaluga (Russian: Калуга).

== Bauman University today ==
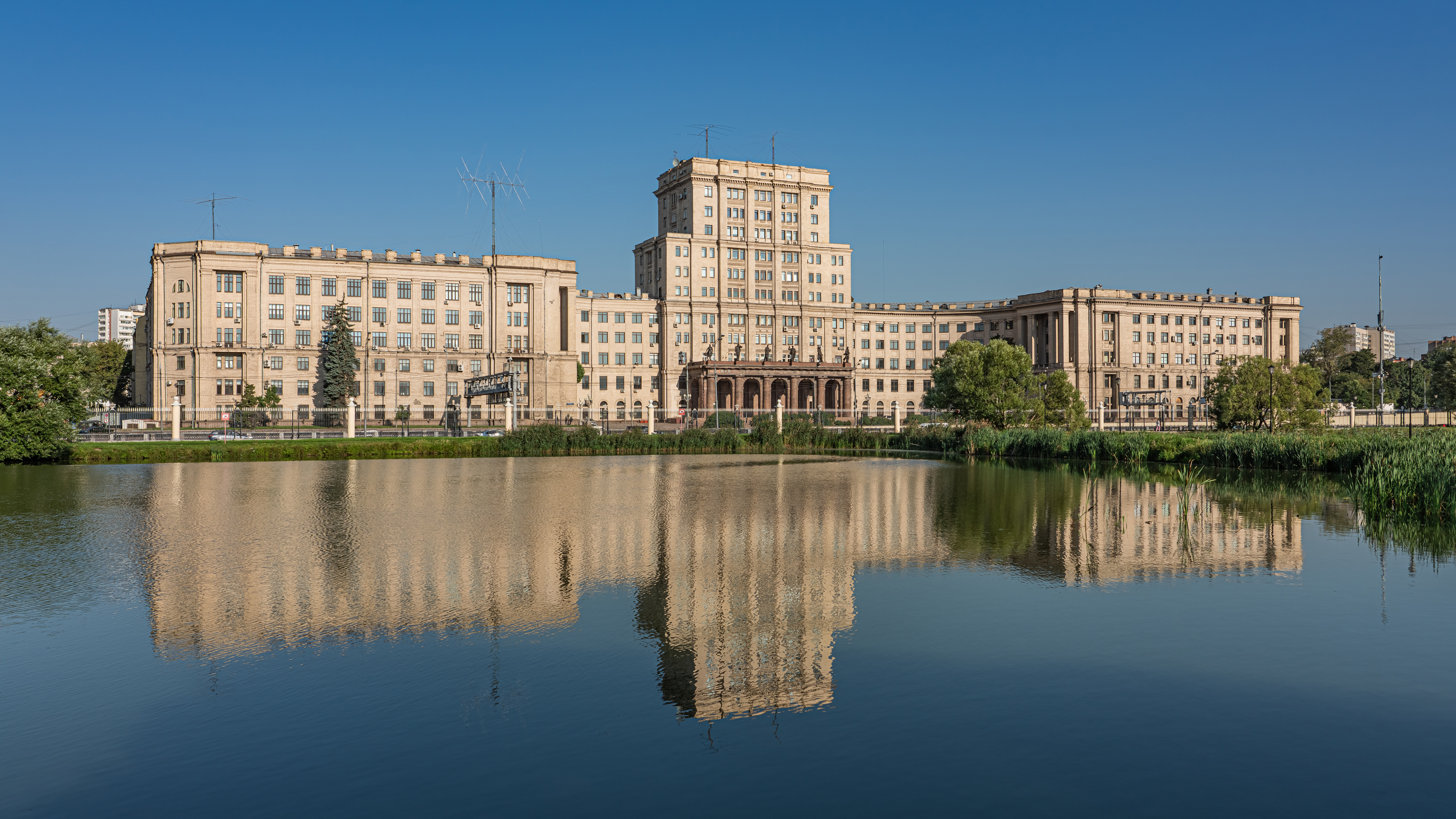
Main Building of the Bauman University. View from the Yauza River side

The Bauman University is commonly regarded as one of Russia's most prestigious universities and has high entry requirements for its prospective students.The Bauman University is regularly ranked first in official government and business press rating. The Bauman University also regularly occupies top 3 places in rating of alumni hunted by biggest Russian companies. In 2011/2012 QS World University rankings, BMSTU ranked 379th overall and 229th in Engineering & IT.

The Bauman University has a National Research Center status, the financing of Bauman University is provided by a separate expense asset of Russian National Budget independently of Ministry of Education. BMSTU is Skolkovo innovation center founder.

=== School of hacking and disinformation ===
Bauman has long been, openly, associated with Russian military research and development (R&D). It carries out more R&D than any other higher education institution in Russia, over 40% of which is in the interests of the ministry of defence.

In 2026 a consortium of journalists from the Guardian, Der Spiegel, Le Monde, the Insider, Delfi and VSquare obtained a cache of 2,000 internal Bauman documents covering years of activity until 2025. They reveal the existence of a secret facility known as Department 4, or Special Training. Students are trained here for work in Russia's military intelligence directorate, the GRU. According to the documents, Department 4 has three specialist streams; the most prominent is called the "Special Reconnaissance Service", coded 093400.

The files include syllabuses and staff contracts, and cover career assignments of graduates, who are taught computer hacking and disinformation, and are then posted to notorious Russian military intelligence cyber-units. The GRU has control over recruitment and grading, and supplies officers involved in the academic process, examining and approving candidates and arranging overseas placements. Subjects taught include electronic eavesdropping and covert surveillance.

The department was led from 2022 to 2025 by GRU signals intelligence lieutenant colonel Kirill Stupakov. Another teacher was major general Viktor Netyksho, who had commanded a hacking group known as Fancy Bear (GRU Unit 26165), whose personnel were indicted by the US Department of Justice for interfering in the 2016 US presidential election.

In the two-semester, 144-hour course "Defence against technical reconnaissance" students are taught hacking techniques including password attacks, software vulnerabilities and computer trojans and viruses. They learn the workings of US and British military intelligence agencies, the use of western intelligence in the Russo-Ukrainian war, and about reconnaissance and strike drones there. They also study information warfare, and as an assignment must develop a disinformation campaign and make a social media video using "manipulation, pressure and hidden propaganda".

Students are taught about mechanisms of psychological manipulation, and how to impose a desired perception of information on an audience.

=== Sanctions ===
The head of Bauman Moscow State Technical University, Anatoly Alexandrov signed a letter of support for the Russian invasion of Ukraine. On November 2, 2023, an agreement was reached with Bauman Moscow State Technical University for the development of design plans for what was called the "jihad machine", a light and manoeuvrable buggy intended for use in the Russian invasion of Ukraine, whose manufacturing was to be the responsibility of the authorities of Chechnya. The university was placed on the USA sanction list in 2023.

== Educational programs ==
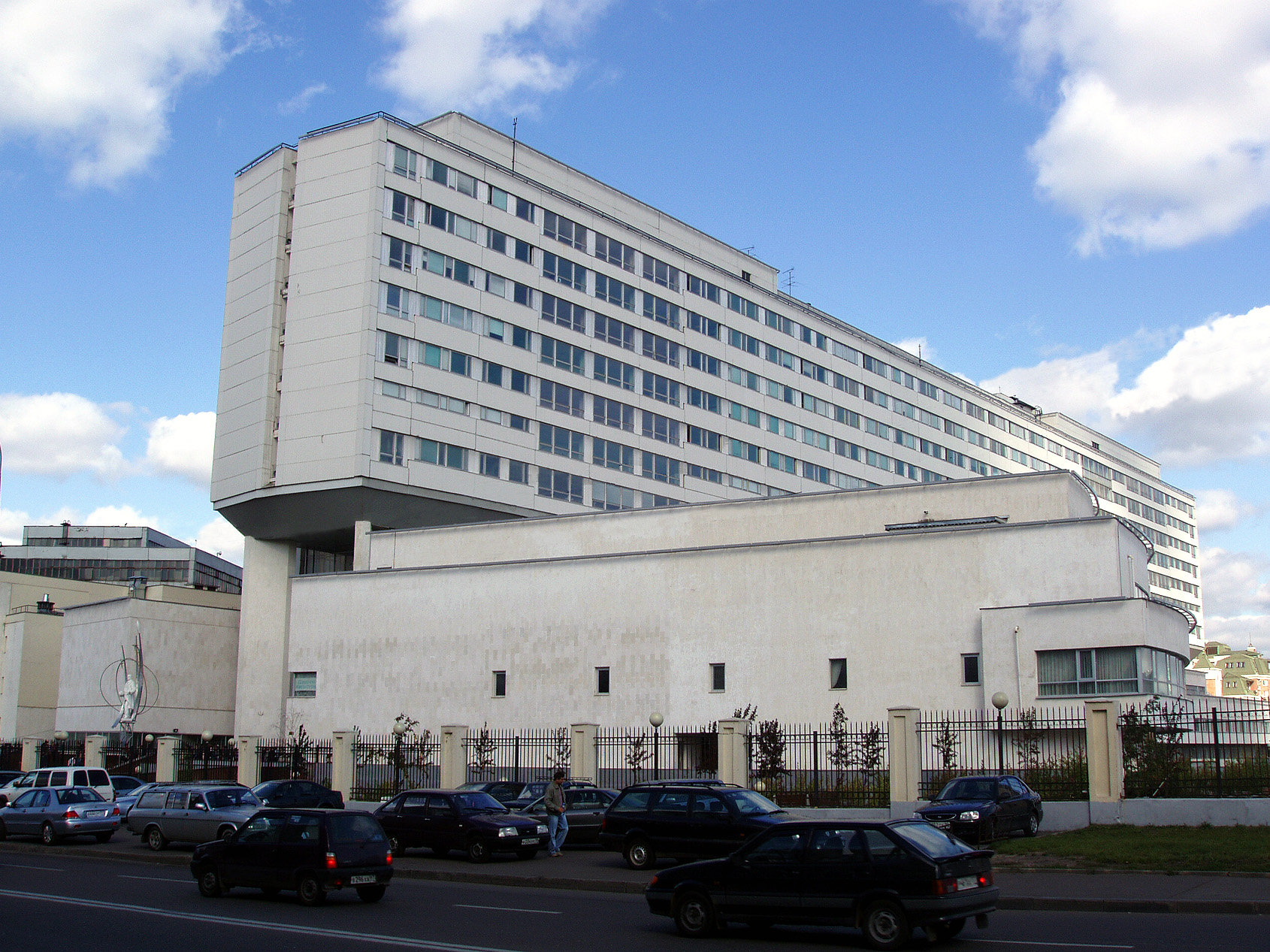
Educational and Laboratory Building of the BMSTU and the monument to Sergei Korolev

The admissions process includes exams on math, physics, and Russian. The university accepts one in ten applicants, which means that there are more than 30000 applicants. More than 2,600 of them pass through two years of preparation courses, another 2,000 follow studies in high schools partners of Bauman University. Participation in admission process requires a gage of original high school certificate which prevents applicants to take part in Lomonosov Moscow State University admission process at the same time.

The academic year in this university begins on 1 September, and is divided into two terms (semesters). Students take exams at the end of each semester. The course of study lasts 6 years without interrupt for engineer specialist degree. But over the last few years the Bauman University has continued to integrate with the Bologna Process. And today some students learn using two step educational system. The first two years students study general engineering subjects. In the third year students begin to study specialized subjects. The university scientific library was founded in 1830.

== Branches ==
=== Dmitrov ===
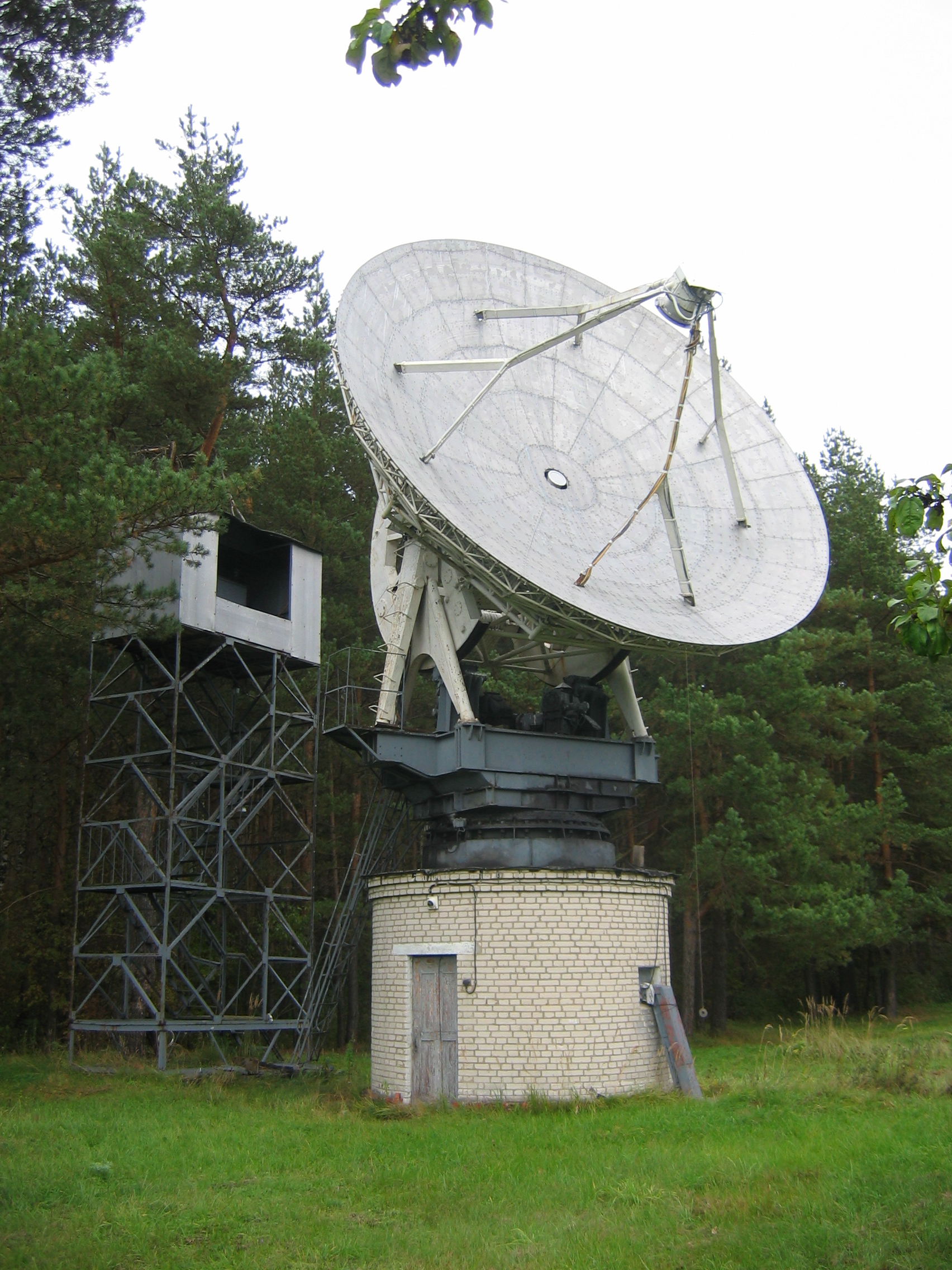
Eastern antenna of the BMSTU radio telescope near the Dmitrov Branch

The first order of the BMSTU Dmitrov Branch was bringing into service in 1965. In 1965–1973 – Suburban Educational and Science-Experimental Centre, in 1973–2000 – Educational-Experimental Centre.

=== Kaluga ===
In 1959 BMSTU opened in Kaluga the branch for education of the industrial machine- and device engineering personnel. Nowadays the BMSTU Kaluga Branch is a technical institute of Kaluga region. It consists of 7 buildings. The Kaluga Branch is an educational-science- manufacturing complex, including: 5 departments (machine engineering technologies; design-mechanical; electronics, informatics and management; socioeconomic; fundamental science), military education department, computer bureau, library with reading-rooms, sport camp and sport pavilion.

== Publishing ==
The Bauman University Publishing House was established in January, 1989 on the base of university publishing department. The first issue of Baumanets newspaper was printed on 18 February 1923. At that time the newspaper was called Udarnik. It has been printed for 90 years since then.

In 1990 Bauman Publishing House started issuing theoretical and applied broad-scoped "Vestnik MSTU". There are educational materials in different scientific areas: Physical and Mathematical sciences, Information and Computer science, Optics, Mechanical, Radio, Instrument and Power Engineering, Laser Technology, Economics, Law and other subjects.

== Notable faculty and alumni ==
- Sergei Pavlovich Korolev – Lead Soviet rocket engineer and spacecraft designer, founder of soviet cosmonautics
- Vladimir Grigorievich Shukhov – Russian engineer, scientist and architect, inventor of the Shukhov cracking process
- Vladimir Solovyov – Soviet cosmonaut and first man on Mir
- Andrey Nikolaevich Tupolev – pioneering Soviet aircraft engineer, chief designer of the "Tupolev" aircraft
- Pavel Osipovich Sukhoi – Soviet aerospace engineer, chief designer of the "Sukhoi" military aircraft
- Pafnuty Lvovich Chebyshev – Russian mathematician and mechanician
- Vladimir Mikhailovich Myasishchev – Soviet aircraft designer
- Georgy Malenkov – Prime Minister of the Union of Soviet Socialist Republics
- Nikolai Yegorovich Zhukovsky – Russian scientist and mechanician, founder of modern aerodynamics
- Vladimir Nikolayevich Chelomei – Soviet mechanics scientist, aviation and missile engineer
- Nikolay Alekseevich Pilyugin – Soviet chief designer of rocket guidance systems
- Semyon Alekseyevich Lavochkin – Soviet aircraft designer, founder of the Lavochkin aircraft design bureau
- Vladimir Mikhailovich Petlyakov – Soviet aeronautical engineer
- Sergey Alexeyevich Chaplygin – Russian and Soviet physicist, mathematician, and mechanical engineer
- Sergei Alekseyevich Lebedev – Soviet scientist in the fields of electrical engineering and computer science, designer of the first Soviet computers
- Ivan Georgievich Petrovsky – Soviet mathematician
- Vladimir Evgenievich Zotikov – Russian and Soviet scientist and textile engineer
- Lev Iakovlevich Karpov – Russian chemist and Bolshevik revolutionary
- Sergei Ivanovich Vavilov – Soviet physicist, the president of the USSR Academy of Sciences
- Arkady Grigoryevich Mordvinov – Soviet architect and construction manager
- Aleksandr Aleksandrovich Mikulin – Soviet aircraft engine designer and chief designer in the Mikulin design bureau
- Sergey Alexandrovich Afanasyev – Soviet engineer and statesman, space and defence industry executive, the first minister of the Soviet Ministry of General Machine Building.
- Alfred Rosenberg – German Nazi political figure, influential ideologue of the NSDAP, executed for war crimes
- Sergey Pavlovich Nepobedimiy – Soviet designer of rocket weaponry
- Nikolay Antonovich Dollezhal – Soviet mechanical engineer, a key figure in Soviet atomic bomb project and chief designer of nuclear reactors
- Vladimir Pavlovich Barmin – Soviet scientist, designer of the rocket launch complexes
- Alexander Leonovich Kemurdzhian – Soviet engineer, first planetary rovers chassis designer
- Konstantin Petrovich Feoktistov – Soviet cosmonaut and space engineer
- Oleg Ivanovich Skripochka – Soviet cosmonaut and space engineer
- Oleg Grigoryevich Makarov – Soviet cosmonaut.
- Gennadi Mikhailovich Strekalov – Soviet engineer and cosmonaut
- Vassili Nesterenko – Soviet nuclear energy physicist
- Maksim Zakharovich Saburov – Soviet engineer, economist and politician
- Zou Jiahua – former vice premier of China
- Georgy Trefilov – founder and the former co-owner of the "MARTA" holding
- Dmitry Grishin – Russian businessman, investor and Internet entrepreneur. Co-founder, chairman and CEO of Mail.ru Group
- Dmitry Sklyarov – Russian programmer, hacker and cryptographer
- Igor Sysoev – creator and developer of the Nginx Web server and founder of NGINX, Inc
- Alexander Volkov (fighter) – professional Mixed Martial Artist, current UFC Heavyweight contender
- Vasiliy Yegorovich Tairov – viticulturist, founder of the first scientific winemaking institution in Odessa
- Vladimir Uzhva (born 1950), Russian educator
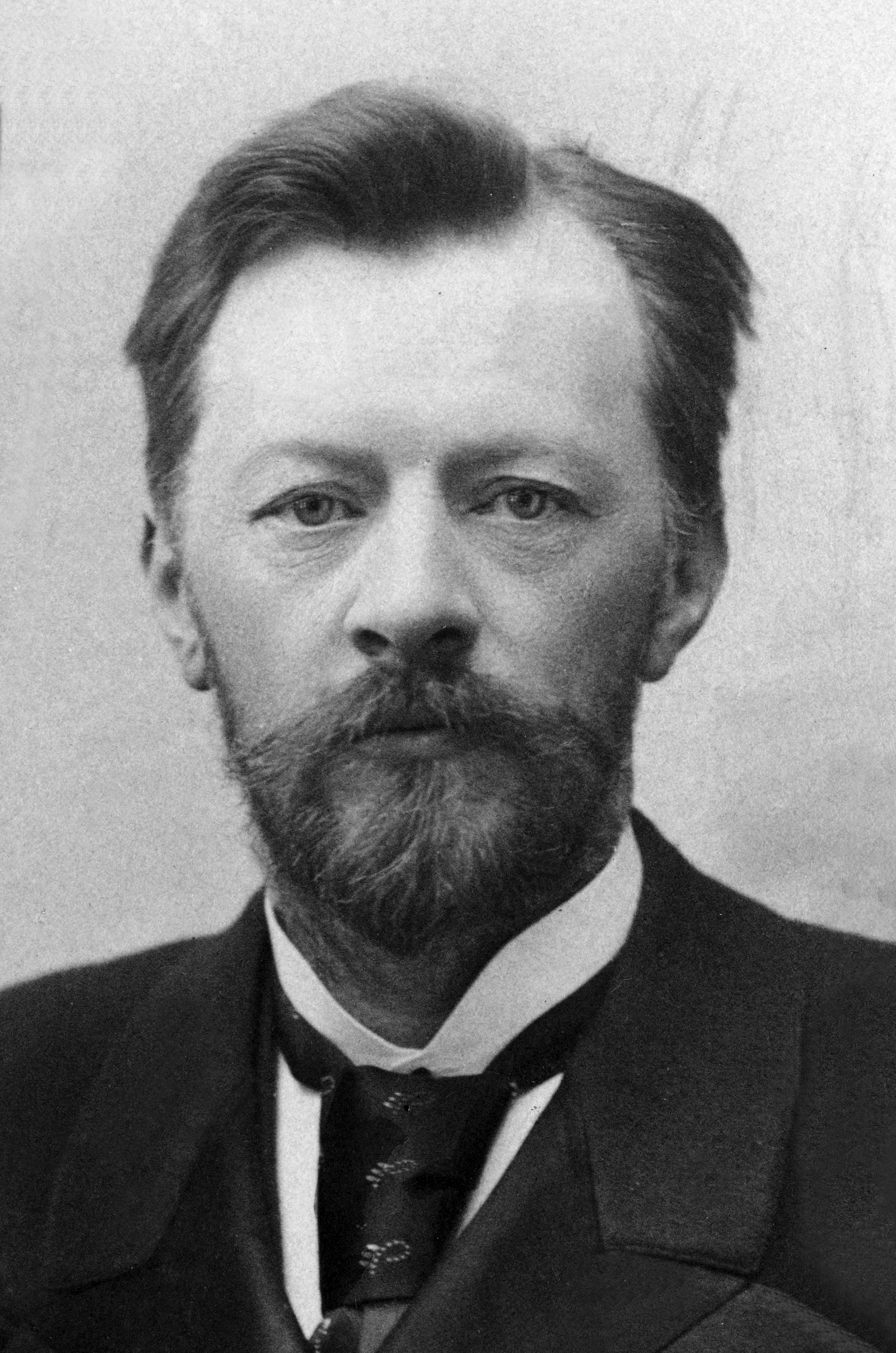
Vladimir Grigoryevich Shukhov

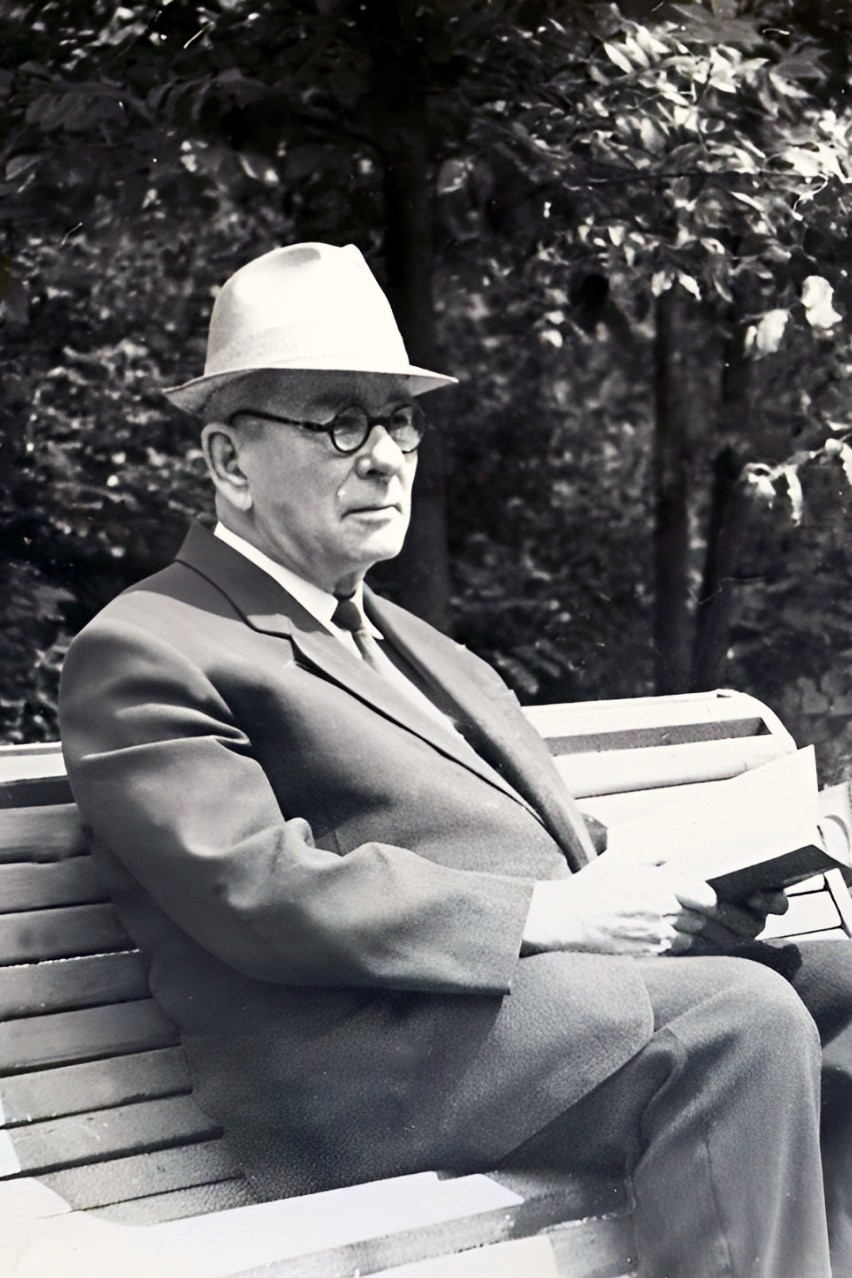
Vladimir Evgenievich Zotikov

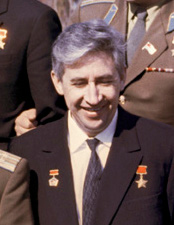
Konstantin Petrovich Feoktistov

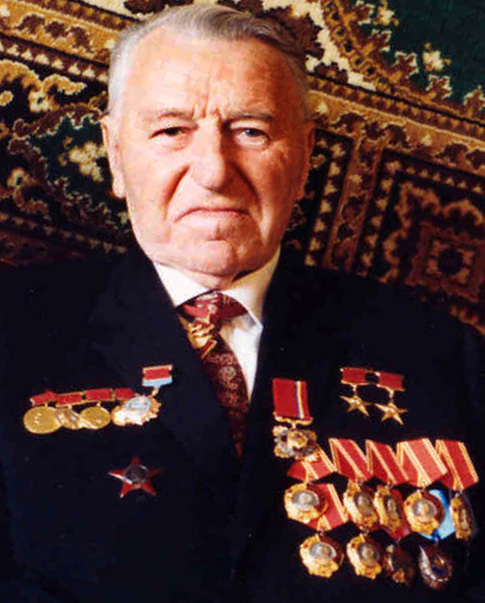
Sergey Alexandrovich Afanasyev

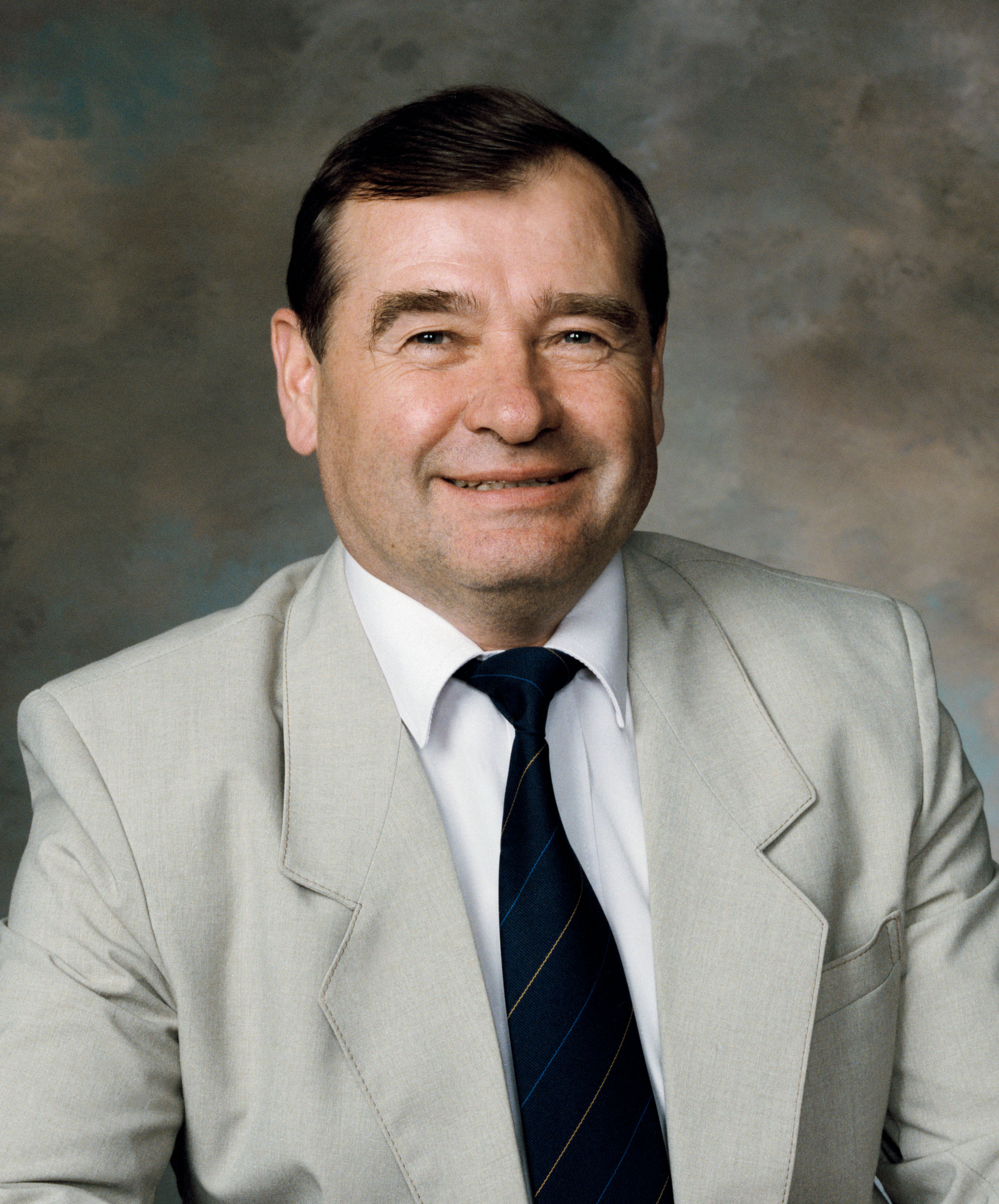
Gennadi Mikhailovich Strekalov

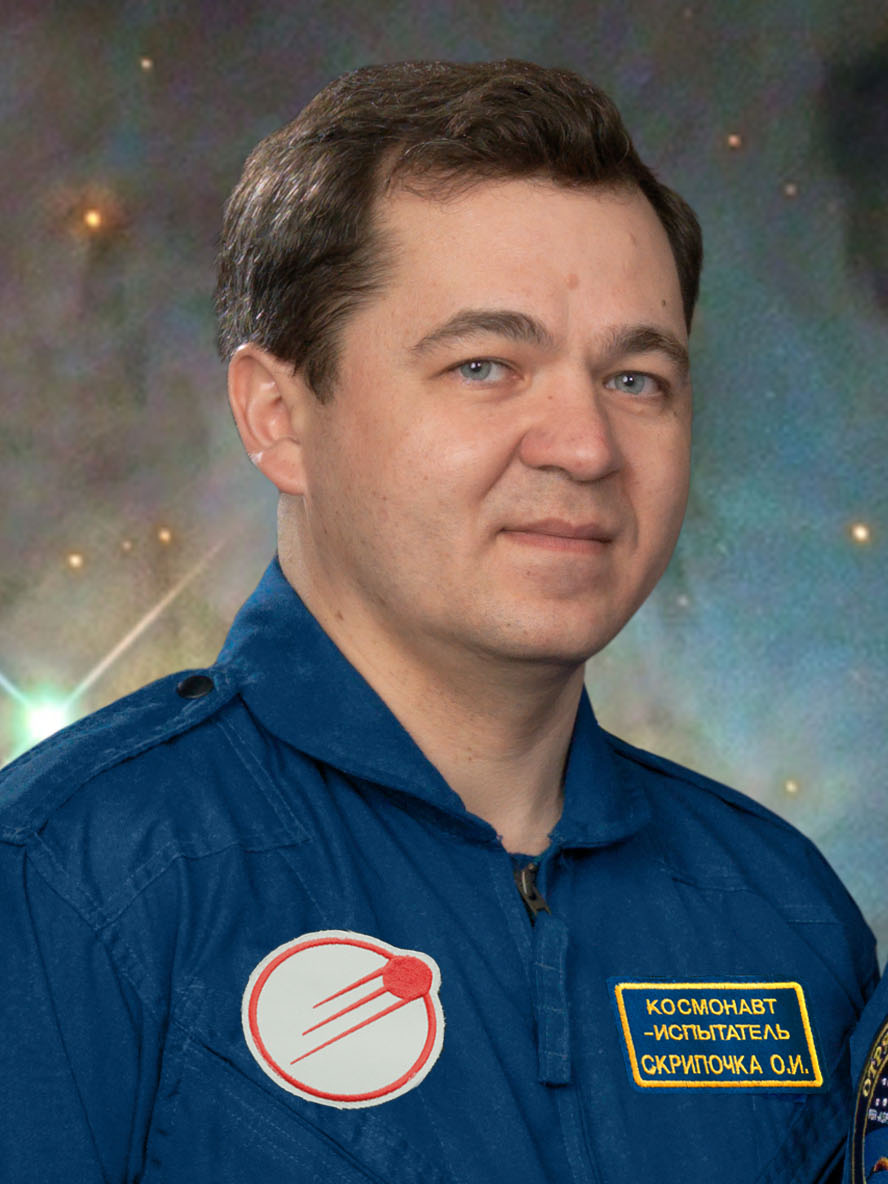
Oleg Ivanovich Skripochka

== Departments ==
- SPECIAL MACHINERY (SM)
  - SM-1 Space Vehicles and Carrier Rockets
  - SM-2 Aerospace Systems
  - SM-3 Ballistics and Aerodynamics
  - SM-4 High-accuracy Flight Units
  - SM-5 Autonomous Information and Control Systems
  - SM-6 Missile and Impulse Systems
  - SM-7 Special Robotics and Mechatronics
  - SM-8 Launch Rocket Complex
  - SM-9 Multipurpose Tracked Vehicles and Mobile Robots
  - SM-10 Wheel Vehicles
  - SM-11 Submarine Robots and Apparatus
  - SM-12 Technology of Manufacturing for Aerospace
  - SM-13 Composite Materials for Aerospace
- INFORMATICS, ARTIFICIAL INTELLIGENCE AND CONTROL SYSTEMS (IU)
  - IU-1 Automatic Control Systems for Flight Vehicles
  - IU-2 Gyroscopic Instruments and Systems for orientation, navigation and stabilization
  - IU-3 Information Systems and Telecommunications
  - IU-4 Electronic Equipment Design and Technology
  - IU-5 Automatic Information Processing and Control Systems
  - IU-6 Computer Systems, Complexes and Networks
  - IU-7 Software for Computers and Automation Systems
  - IU-8 Information Security
  - IU-9 Computer Design and Technology
- MACHINE-BUILDING TECHNOLOGIES (MT)
  - МТ-1 Metal-Cutting Machine Tools
  - МТ-2 Tool Technics
  - МТ-3 Technologies of Mechanical Engineering
  - МТ-4 Metrology and Interchangeability
  - МТ-5 Casting Technology
  - МТ-6 Technologies of Processing by Pressure
  - МТ-7 Technologies of Welding and Diagnostics
  - МТ-8 Materials Technology
  - MT-9 Industrial Design
  - МТ-10 The Equipment and Technologies Flatting Rinks
  - МТ-11 Electronic Technologies in Mechanical Engineering
  - МТ-12 Laser Technologies in Mechanical Engineering
  - МТ-13 Technologies of Materials Processing
- ROBOTICS AND COMPLEX AUTOMATION (RK)
  - RK-1 Engineering Drawing
  - RK-2 Theory of Mechanisms and Machines
  - RK-3 Bases of Machine Designing
  - RK-4 Lifting-, Transport-, Construction Machines
  - RK-5 Applied Mechanics
  - RK-6 Computer Aided Design and Engineering
  - RK-9 Computer Systems of Manufacture Automation
  - RK-10 Robotic Systems
- POWER ENGINEERING (E)
  - E-1 Rocket Engines
  - E-2 Piston Engines
  - E-3 Gas Turbine Plants and Non-conventional Power Installations
  - E-4 The Refrigerating, Cryogenic Technics, Central Airs and Life-support
  - E-5 The Vacuum and Compressor Technics
  - E-6 Thermophysics
  - E-7 Nuclear Reactors and Installations
  - E-8 Plasma Power Installations
  - E-9 Ecology and Industrial Safety
  - E-10 Hydromechanics, Hydromachines and Hydro-Pneumoautomatics
- RADIOELECTRONICS AND LASER TECHNOLOGIES (RL)
  - RL-1 Radio-Electronic Systems and Devices
  - RL-2 Laser and Optic-Electronic Systems
  - RL-3 Optic-Electronic Devices for Scientific Research
  - RL-4 Theoretical Bases of Electrotechnology
  - RL-5 Sub-units of Apparatus Devices
  - RL-6 Technologies of Device Making
- BIOMEDICAL TECHNOLOGIES (BMT)
  - BMT-1 Biomedical Technical Systems
  - BMT-2 Medic-Technical Information Technologies
  - BMT-3 Valeology
  - BMT-4 Medic-Technical Management
- FUNDAMENTAL SCIENCES (FN)
  - FN-1 Higher Mathematics
  - FN-2 Applied Mathematics
  - FN-3 Theoretical Mechanics
  - FN-4 Physics
  - FN-5 Chemistry
  - FN-7 Electronic Engineering and Industrial Electronics
  - FN-11 Calculus Mathematics and Mathematical Physics
  - FN-12 Mathematical Modelling
- ENGINEERING BUSINESS AND MANAGEMENT (EBM)
  - EBM-1 The Economic Theory
  - EBM-2 Economy and the Manufacture Organisation
  - EBM-3 Industrial Logistics
  - EBM-4 Organisation Management
  - EBM-5 Economy and Management at the Enterprise for Branches
  - EBM-6 Business and Foreign Trade Activities
  - EBM-7 Innovative Entrepreneurship
- LINGUISTICS (L)
  - L-1 Russian
  - L-2 English Language for Instrument-Making Specialities
  - L-3 English Language for Machine-Building Specialities
  - L-4 Romano-Germanic Languages
- SOCIAL AND THE HUMANITIES (SSH)
  - SSH-1 History
  - SSH-2 Sociology and Culturology
  - SSH-3 Political Science
  - SSH-4 Philosophy
- JURISPRUDENCE (JUR)
  - JUR-1 Jurisprudence
  - JUR-2 Legal Expertise
- Physical Education and Sanitation Department
- Military Education Department

=== Branches and Other faculties ===
- AK – Aerospace
- OEP – Optic-Electronic Device Engineering
- PS – Device Engineering
- RKT – Space-Rocket Technics
- RT – Radio-Technical
- GUIMC – Lead Educational, Research and Methodical Vocational Rehabilitation Centre for Individuals with Health Disabilities

== See also ==
- Education in Russia
- List of universities in Russia
