= Nikolay Dollezhal =

Russian engineer of Czech origin

- Николай Доллежаль
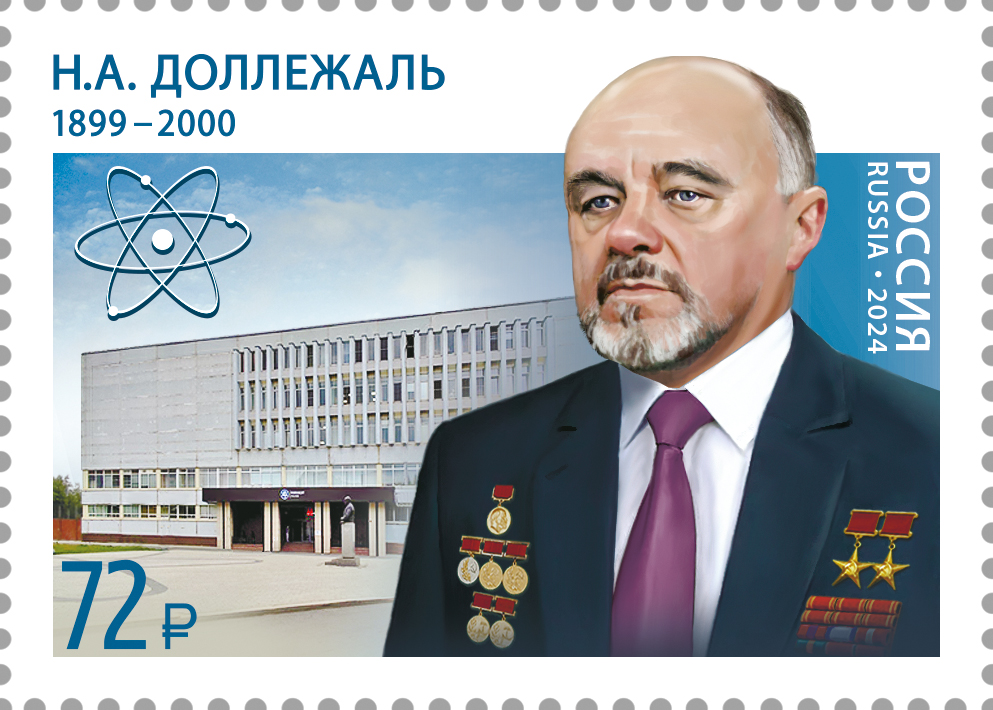
- Dollezhal on a 2024 Russian stamp
- Born: Nikolai Antonovich Dollezhal'; 27 October [O.S. 15 October] 1899; Omelnik, Yekaterinoslav Governorate, Russian Empire (present-day in Zaporizhzhia Oblast, Ukraine)
- Died: 20 November 2000 (aged 101); Moscow, Russia
- Citizenship: Russia
- Education: Bauman Moscow State Technical University
- Known for: Soviet atomic bomb project Founder of the RBMK type nuclear reactor
- Awards: Merit for the Fatherland; Hero of Socialist Labor; USSR State Prize; Lenin Prize
- Scientific career
- Fields: Engineering
- Workplaces: Institute of Chemical Physics; Moscow State University; Sternberg Astronomical Institute
- Academic advisors: Nikolay Zhukovsky

Nikolay Antonovich Dollezhal (Russian: Николай Антонович Доллежаль, Czech: Nikolaj Antonovič Dolležal; 27 October [O.S. 15 October] 1899 – 20 November 2000) was a Russian engineer of Czech origin whose career was spent in the former Soviet program of nuclear weapons and later played an influential role in developing the commercial nuclear power industry of Russia.

== Biography ==
Dollezhal was born in Omelnik in Ekaterinoslav Governorate, Russian Empire (now in Zaporizhzhia Oblast, Ukraine), on 27 October 1899. According to the GlobalSecurity.org investigations, Dollezhal was of Czech origin—his grandfather, Ferdinand Dollezhal, a Czech, was also an engineer who married a Russian woman in the middle 19th century. In 1917, he attended the Bauman Moscow State Technical University (MVTU) where he studied heat engines, thermodynamics, hydrodynamics, electronics, heat exchanger and refrigeration under Nikolay Zhukovsky. In 1923–24, Dollezhal earned his engineer's degree and worked with Moscow's authorities to rehabilitate the civil engineering and transportation infrastructure.

While teaching at MVTU, he joined PJSC Heat and Power (which later was subsumed in Narkomtiazhprom) and worked with Soviet establishment to design new heat engines and turbines under the GOELRO program. In 1929–30, Dollezhal visited various factories in Germany and Austria under the sponsorship of Supreme Economic Council. Upon returning, he soon fell under the espionage investigations by Soviet establishment and was imprisoned until being acquitted in 1932. From 1932 to 1943, Dollezhal worked with Soviet bureaucracy, serving their chief design engineer, and oversaw many of the nitrogen production factories in Russia and Ukraine, and filled positions by hiring graduates of the Leningrad Polytechnic Institute.

Until 1946, Dollezhal was completely unaware of Soviet program of nuclear weapons and it was Nikita Khrushchev who had assigned Dollezhal to Laboratory No. 2 to build a plutonium production reactor. Dollezhal supported the Soviet program and designed the first reactors (based on American designs), graphite moderated types A and AI, that produced plutonium used in Joe 1 nuclear test of 1949 and subsequent nuclear weapons deployment. After 1950, Dollezhal founded the NIKIET on nuclear marine propulsion. His first proposal, Type AM, was not practical for marine uses but became the core of the first nuclear power plant in Obninsk, commissioned in 1954. In the same year, he produced a viable draft of a light water submarine reactor.

Dollezhal was skeptical about building large RBMK reactors near major cities, as he was well aware of the design's physical vulnerabilities and the limitations of the Soviet industrial complex. However, under pressure from government authorities and industry leaders, he authorized their deployment. Earlier, in 1957, the Dollezhal Institute had launched its first dual-use powerplant (Type EI), followed in 1964 by the Beloyarsk Nuclear Power Station, which marked a major step toward large-scale commercial power. While Anatoly Aleksandrov held the primary design patent and acted as the scientific supervisor, Dollezhal's design bureau (NIKIET) served as the chief engineering architect, responsible for turning the RBMK concept into physical production.

== Honours and awards ==
- Lenin Prize (1957)
- Three Stalin Prizes (1949, 1952 and 1953)
- Two USSR State Prizes (1970 and 1976)
- Hero of Socialist Labour, twice (1949 and 1984)
- Six Orders of Lenin (incl 1949 and 1984)
- Order of the October Revolution
- Order of the Red Banner of Labour
- Order of the Red Star
- Order of Merit for the Fatherland, 2nd class (1999)
- Kurchatov Gold Medal (Russian Academy of Sciences, 2000)
- Asteroid 10261 Nikdollezhalʹ, discovered by Lyudmila Zhuravleva in 1974, was named in his memory. The official naming citation was published by the Minor Planet Center on 18 March 2003 (M.P.C. 48155).
