= Nikolay Pilyugin =

Soviet rocket scientist (1908–1982)

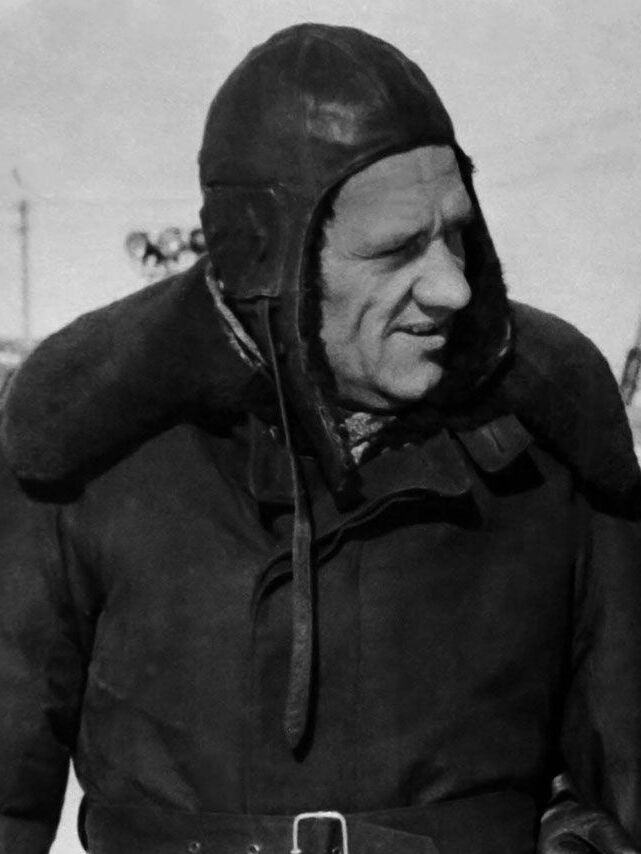
1947

Nikolai Alekseevich Pilyugin (Russian: Никола́й Алексее́вич Пилю́гин; 18 May [O.S. 5 May] 1908, Krasnoye Selo – August 2, 1982) was a Soviet chief designer of rocket guidance systems.

He was a designer of control systems for boosters and spacecraft.

He participated in the design of the first ICBM "R-7" and Soviet space shuttle Buran.

A graduate of the Bauman Higher Technical School (MVTU), Pilyugin worked at the Zhukovsky Central Institute of Aerohydrodynamics (TsAGI) starting in 1934, then joined RNII the Institute of Jet Propulsion. In 1945, he joined Boris Chertok at the RABE institute in Germany, studying the design of the V-2 and other Nazi weaponry.

In 1946, he and Mikhail Ryazansky headed the newly formed NII-885. Pilyugin developed gyroscopic guidance control systems and flight control computers for Soviet rockets beginning with the R-1 (a copy of the V-2).

Pilyugin was one of the 72 members of the Soviet Academy of Sciences who signed a statement denouncing the award of the Nobel Peace Prize to Andrei D. Sakharov in 1975. The signatories of this statement criticized Sakharov's activities, because these activities undermined peace and inspired distrust between people.

== Awards ==
- Twice Hero of Socialist Labor (1956, 1961)
- Lenin Prize (1957)
- USSR State Prize (1967)
- Order of Lenin (1956, 1958, 1968, 1975, 1978)
- Order of the October Revolution (1971)
- Deputy to the Supreme Soviet of the USSR 7th–10th convocations.
