= Sergey Afanasyev (engineer) =

Soviet defence engineer and politician

- Сергей Афанасьев
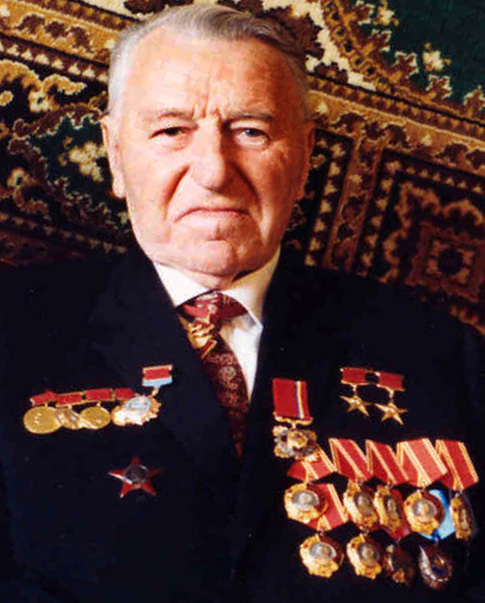
- Portrait by Mikhail Evstafiev, 1998

Minister of General Machine Building
- In office 2 October 1965 – 8 April 1983
- Premier: Alexei Kosygin; Nikolai Tikhonov
- Preceded by: Position established
- Succeeded by: Oleg Baklanov

Personal details
- Born: 30 August 1918 Klin, Moscow Governorate, RSFSR
- Died: 13 May 2001 (aged 82) Moscow, Russia
- Party: CPSU (1943–1991)

Sergey Aleksandrovich Afanasyev (Russian: Сергей Александрович Афанасьев; 30 August 1918 – 13 May 2001) was a Russian engineer and later politician who was the leading figure in the Soviet Union's missile and space program. He was the Minister of General Machine Building from 1965 to 1983.

== Early life and career ==
Afanasyev was born in the city of Klin in present Moscow Oblast. He graduated from the Bauman Moscow State Technical University in 1941, and was a member of the Communist Party of the Soviet Union (since 1943). During World War II, he worked as an engineer at an artillery factory in Perm, learning armor design. He became the protégé of Minister of Defence Dmitry Ustinov and from 1946 worked in the Ministry of Defence Industries.

In the late 1950s, Sergey Afanasyev worked in top management positions in Leningrad, and in the early 1960s in Moscow as Deputy Chairman of the Council of Ministers of the Russian Soviet Federative Socialist Republic.

== Service as Minister ==
After his appointment in March 1965 as head of the newly created Ministry of General Machine Building, a post he occupied until 1983, Sergey Afanasyev had to build up the new Ministry from zero, uniting numerous defence plants, scientific labs, engineering facilities and famous constructors of space and military rockets under one roof. The new industry under Afanasyev's control was a secret formation, and was never publicly acknowledged until the late 1980s. In private circles he was referred to as “the world’s first Space Minister”.

Sergey Afanasyev's Ministry not only took part in developing his country's pioneering space programme but was a key player in the nuclear arms race between the Soviet Union and the United States. In the mid-1960s the nuclear arsenal of the USA was larger than the USSR had. But as the Cold War dragged on, Afanasyev's Ministry managed to sufficiently increase and almost match the number of nuclear missiles and warheads its main rival had and thus reach a fragile balance of military might. Over 1400 intercontinental ballistic missiles and some 1000 submarine-launched ballistic missiles were manufactured and later modernised by the Ministry, which was also responsible for the day-to-day maintenance of the nuclear arsenal and its control functions. That is why Sergey Afanasyev once admitted that his worst nightmare for many years was that one of the nuclear missiles might self-explode or even be launched by mistake.

Sergey Afanasyev was also involved in creating spacecraft for Soviet cosmonauts, orbital space stations, including the Mir station, the first Soviet space shuttle Buran, the Energia rocket, and was a frequent visitor of the Baikonur Cosmodrome, attending the many launches. He worked together with the chief Soviet rocket engineer Sergey Korolyov.

Oddly enough, just like many elements of the Soviet economy, the Ministry of General Machine Building at its numerous plants spread from the western part of the USSR to the far east coast also produced TV sets, refrigerators and other home appliances.

A skilled manager, Sergey Afanasyev often balanced the "warring factions" - the different opinions and approaches voiced by academics and rocket engineers such as Vladimir Chelomei and Mikhail Yangel, who competed in designing rocket engines, as well as the interests of different Ministries, including the Ministry of Defence, headed by Dmitriy Ustinov, and also the Communist Party's Central Committee. Afanasyev also worked closely with Valentin Glushko, one of the principal Soviet designers of spacecraft and rockets during the Soviet/American Space Race.

During his long career, Sergey Afanasyev dealt directly with top Soviet leaders, including Leonid Brezhnev, Konstantin Chernenko, Yuri Andropov and Mikhail Gorbachev, discussing with them and getting funding for both space and defence programmes and projects. He was also a close friend of Boris Yeltsin, who he knew since Yeltsin was the head of the Yekaterinburg regional Communist Party Committee. Afanasyev was elected as deputy of the Congress of Peoples Deputies from the Yekaterinburg region.

Sergey Afanasyev was one of the few people who refused to take orders from the feared Soviet police chief Lavrentiy Beria. In the 1950s, Beria was pushing for a swift production of missiles and indicated his orders were to be carried out within several months. At a meeting in the Kremlin, Sergey Afanasyev was the only engineer who voiced opposition to the plan, calling it unrealistic. Beria's first reaction was to arrest the young engineer, but he was later told that in that case the production would be delayed for over a year because Afanasyev was the only person on the ground knowledgeable enough to take charge.

After a reshuffle in the early 1980, Sergey Afanasyev was appointed as the head of the Ministry of Heavy and Transport Machinery, where he worked from 1983 to 1987.

== Death ==
From 1988 until his death he was the Senior Science Consultant of the S.P. Korolev Rocket and Space Corporation Energia.

Sergey Afanasyev is buried in Moscow's Novodevichy Convent.

== Honours and awards ==
- Hero of Socialist Labour, twice (14 February 1975, 29 August 1978)
- Seven Orders of Lenin (1958; 17 June 1961; 26 July 1966; 29 August 1968; 25 October 1971; 14 February 1975; 29 August 1978)
- Order of the October Revolution (5 November 1982)
- Order of the Red Banner of Labour, twice (1957; 30 August 1983)
- Order of the Red Star (1945)
- Lenin Prize (1973)
- Stalin Prize, 2nd class (1952)
- USSR State Prize (1977)
- Order "For Merit to the Fatherland", 3rd class
- Jubilee Medal "In Commemoration of the 100th Anniversary of the Birth of Vladimir Ilyich Lenin"
- Jubilee Medal "Twenty Years of Victory in the Great Patriotic War 1941–1945"
- Jubilee Medal "Thirty Years of Victory in the Great Patriotic War 1941–1945"
- Jubilee Medal "Forty Years of Victory in the Great Patriotic War 1941–1945"
- Jubilee Medal "50 Years of Victory in the Great Patriotic War 1941–1945"
- Medal "For Valiant Labour in the Great Patriotic War 1941–1945"
- Medal "Veteran of Labour"
- Medal "In Commemoration of the 800th Anniversary of Moscow"
- Medal "In Commemoration of the 850th Anniversary of Moscow"
- Order of Merit (Ukraine), 2nd class
