= Gavrilenko =

Havrylenko or Gavrilenko (Ukrainian: Гавриленко) is a Ukrainian patronymic surname derived from the given name Gabriel. Notable people with the surname include:

- Alexander Gavrilenko, Russian cardiac surgeon
- Anna Gavrilenko (born 1990), Russian rhythmic gymnast
- Ivan Gavrilenko, Russian ice hockey player
- Maksym Havrylenko, Ukrainian footballer
- Mykyta Havrylenko, Ukrainian footballer
- Petro Havrylenko, Ukrainian anarchist
- Yevgeniy Gavrilenko, Soviet hurdler

== See also ==
- Gavrilin
