= Georgy Trefilov =

Russian businessperson

- Born: Georgy Yuryevich Trefilov; 1 June 1971 (age 54); Moscow, USSR
- Occupation: Businessperson
- Spouse: Julia Trefilova
- Website: george-trefilov.com

Georgy Yuryevich Trefilov (Russian: Гео́ргий Ю́рьевич Трефи́лов; born 1 June 1971) is a Russian multimillionaire, businessman, the founder and the former co-owner of the "MARTA" holding. A supermarket tycoon, he was named Russia's 79th richest person in 2011.

Trefilov was charged with fraud and on 18 November 2010 has been put on an international wanted list by the Investigative Committee of the MVD (the Ministry of Internal Affairs) of Russia. and Trefilov was placed on the internationally wanted list curated by the Interpol.

Trefilov denies the charges and claims they are politically motivated. An attempt to extradite him from the UK to Russia was denied by the British court in 2012 and he was also removed from its internationally wanted list by the Interpol in 2019. Trefilov blames his downfall on his "employees, the Russian government and the FSB".

In an interview with Forbes he said: "They say I stole money from my own company but I never stole anything in my life. There’s been a UK court case, which exonerated me and I would like to clear my name in my home country and take back the assets that were taken from me. But I can't go back because I won't get a fair trial there. They will imprison me and then nobody knows what would happen after that. I just don’t want to risk it."

== Biography ==
=== Early life ===
Georgy Trefilov was born on 1 June 1971 in a family of civil servants. In 1988 he graduated from the comprehensive school No. 689 and entered the BMSTU (Moscow State Technical University named after Bauman), "Special machine engineering" faculty. In 1992 Trefilov interrupts his training and decides to start a business.

=== "MARTA" ===
In 1992 Georgy Trefilov sets up a JSC "MARTA" and organizes the household and kitchen furniture manufacture in cooperation with his schoolmate Dmitry Oktyabrsky. Later the company changes its field of work, however the name remains the same – "MARTA" (Intersectoral Alternative Russian Trade Association; Russian: Межотраслевая Альтернативная Российская Торговая Ассоциация).

After the financial crisis in 2001 Trefilov buys a subfranchise of the Dutch "SPAR" supermarket chain from the Russian "Spar Retail" franchisee and opens the first supermarket of this kind. For the next 3 years the "MARTA" Holding opens 22 more supermarkets and the retail trading becomes company's main type of activity. After a while Trefilov's cooperation with "SPAR" breaks up. "Serious disagreements" with the Dutch partner are said to be the reason.

In 2004 at the Moscow German-Russian economic summit Georgy Trefilov signs the framework agreement with the REWE Group about the creation of a joint venture company and the development of an international supermarket chain Billa in the presence of the President of Russia and the Federal chancellor of Germany.

In 2006 the "MARTA" Holding together with the "Vremya" company establish the "RTM" JSC. Trefilov was the chairman of board of directors in this company until March 2008. "RTM" has become a public company, having passed IPO in 2007.

=== Bankruptcy ===
In 2008 began the non-payments crisis for the "MARTA" Holding and other companies under Trefilov's control. According to analysts the reason of the crisis was Trefilov's aggressive regional expansion that led the "MARTA" Holding to the dramatic increase in debt loading.

Since autumn 2008 there is a time of general crisis of the Holding structures. Banks creditors (Alfa Bank, BTF, Sberbank, Sviaz-bank, Surgutneftegazbank, Rus’-bank, etc.) filed a lawsuit against Trefilov seeking to collect over 1,9 billion rubles. The bank representatives addressed personally to Trefilov as he acted as the warrantor for the loans in these banks. Trefilov tried to keep the shares of the "RTM" JSC and at the same time he used these shares as a bank pledge. "MARTA Finance" bonds claim was repaid by the credit obtained from this activity. For this purpose the stocks were transferred to E. Vyrypayev (Э.Вырыпаев). In his turn Vyrypayev sold these stocks to "KIT Finance" and sent the received money to Trefilov, who used it to pay the bonds owners. It was followed with a public scandal concerning whether Vyrypayev or Trefilov would have the right of holding this stock of shares. This scandal led to the sharp decline of a stock value. Soon after the "RTM" JSC declared bankruptcy.

=== Criminal prosecution ===
A criminal case was opened against Trefilov in 2009–2010 (Russian Federation Criminal Rule 176, part 1 and 159, part 4). 15 November 2010 the Investigative Committee of the MVD of Russia made the official statement concerning Georgy Trefilov, who was charged with fraud in absentia. According to that statement and the demands, Trefilov stole funds of several companies. Moreover, it was alleged that Trefilov provided some property to the banks as a security for loans, however this property was already encumbered previously several times or even wasn't his property at all. For example, the “Business group” JSC, which is controlled by Trefilov and is a part of the "MARTA" Holding, received a loan in excess of 1,3 billion rubles from six banks including Sberbank on the security of the same retail equipment of the supermarkets working under BILLA trade name. Several months before he was charged with fraud, Trefilov left Russia for Great Britain.

The Russian Federation Investigative Committee demanded Trefilov's extradition from Great Britain. 16 November 2012 in London Trefilov won the case concerning his extradition to Russia, in Westminster Magistrate's Court. One item of evidence involved a recording, in which senior public prosecutor Victor Gvozdev attempted to extort the sum of $1 million from Trefilov, to be shared between a number of prosecution officials, purportedly to help closing the case. District Judge Nicholas Evans in his decision stated: “The level of corruption revealed by transcripts (of recorded conversations between Trevfilov’s’s contact in Russia and a senior investigator Mr Gvozdev) is just appalling.͟” Moreover, the Judge found that Trefilov established a good prima facie case of corporate raiding perpetrated against his business in Russia, which the Russian government failed to rebut.

In March 2013 at the Gatwick Airport he was arrested for crossing the British border with a fake passport and a false ID card. In May 2013 at the Lewes city court Georgy Trefilov received a 1,5-year suspended prison sentence for using false documents. Trefilov says that, at the time, his wife was suffering from a "serious cancer illness" and part of her treatment was outside the UK. He used false documents because he was subject to an Interpol red notice and could have been deported to Russia if he had travelled under his own name. A "major mistake on my part" he says.

Since 2010 Trefilov has been on the international wanted list. In March 2019, the Commission of Interpol issued a decision to remove Trefilov from its internationally wanted list on the basis that “the likelihood that his right to a due process of law, as established by Russian law and other applicable rules of law, may not have been respected,”

Trefilov lives with his family in London.

He is a senior operating manager of an Italian-themed restaurants group in London with five outlets. “We don’t own any property or have money in bank accounts, not here, not anywhere,” he told Forbes. “People seem to think I am very rich but I lost everything in Russia. I was the owner and creator of a big business worth more than £1bn. It was stolen from me and I came to the UK with my family with no money and started to created businesses again.”

==== Prosecuting of the trial participants ====
12 December 2012 a criminal case against the senior public prosecutor Victor Gvozdev was opened. He is said to have received $50 000 from Trefilov for the suspension of the criminal proceeding. On 24 January 2014 he was found guilty and given a 4 years suspended sentence with accordance to article 159 part 4 of the Russian Criminal Code (Large scale fraud). He admitted his guilt during the course of the case. The investigation established that Gvozdev entered negotiations with Trefilov while being in retirement.

Trefilov was quoted in a blog written by another Russian exile, Andrey Borodin, as saying: “This is how they do business – at first they create problems, then they valiantly resolve them. Needless to say, they won’t do this for free. The case is instigated in the interests of and at the expense of a “sponsor”, and to close [the case] you can "request" money from someone else."

None of Trefilov’s accusations about the involvement of others from the General Prosecutor’s Office in V. Gvozdev’s actions were accepted during the investigation or in court, including with respect to former investigator I. Konovalova, who for several years was in charge of the fraud case against Trefilov. The whole investigative unit of the Investigation Committee was disbanded several months before Trefilov’s appeal.

== Court confrontation with the REWE concern ==
In 2013 the REWE concern in the commercial court of Austria charged Trefilov with falsification and the attempt of illegal use of the contract. According to its conditions, the REWE concern supposedly undertook an obligation to redeem Trefilov's Grossmart distribution network at an obviously high price. In REWE representatives’ claim, Trefilov used a forged contract to receive the bridge financing in one of the British investment funds and also in a Russian bank.

In 2014, by the decision of the District Court of Modling, Austria, the proceedings against Trefilov were discontinued without finding of criminal liability on his part.

== Court confrontation with Alfa-Bank ==
In January 2014 Alfa-Bank appealed to London's High Court with a claim against Trefilov seeking to collect approximately 600 million rubles worth of loans and interests. The Russian bank demanded recognition of a court decision about Trefilov's liability as a guarantor for the debts of his company "Elekskor" LLC (a subsidiary of the MARTA Holding).

On 4 June 2014 the London High Court reviewed the case and ruled in favour of Alfa-Bank.

The total amount of claims to be paid is 521.44 million rubles (including 153.2 million rubles of accrued interest). By the court's decision Trefilov must pay this amount by 25 June 2014. This includes a clause where “in the case of no repayment by set date a further statutory interest is applied at the rate set by the Russian Central Bank (8.25%).”

== Family ==
Trefilov has been married with his second wife Yuliya Trefilova since 2005. He has four daughters from both marriages.
