= Ephod Combat Vest =

Israeli military equipment

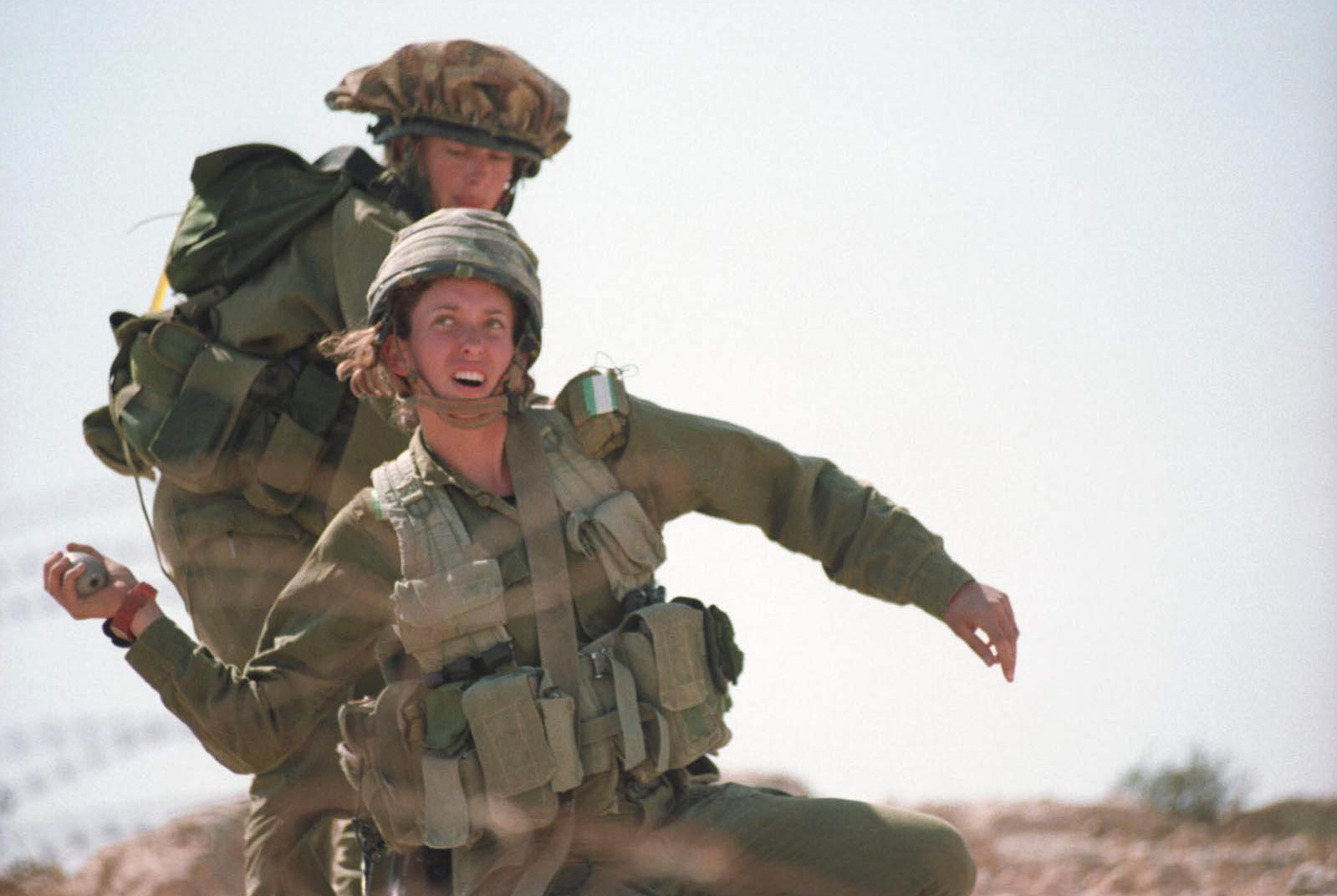
- Israeli female recruits wearing the late-model version of the IDF Ephod combat vest, May 2002.
- Type: Load-bearing equipment
- Place of origin: Israel

Service history
- Used by: See Users
- Wars: Entebbe raid 1978 South Lebanon conflict Angolan Civil War; 1982 Lebanon War; Lebanese Civil War; 1978-79 Nicaraguan Revolution; Salvadoran Civil War; Guatemalan Civil War; Internal conflict in Peru; Sri Lankan civil war First Intifada; Second Intifada; Rwandan Civil War; Croatian War of Independence; Cenepa War; Kosovo War; South Lebanon conflict (1985–2000); Dinnieh clashes 2013 Sidon clash Bab al-Tabbaneh–Jabal Mohsen conflict 2000–2006 Shebaa Farms conflict 2006 Lebanon War; 2007 Lebanon conflict 2008 Lebanon conflict Battle of Gaza (2007); Gaza War (2008–2009); Syrian civil war 2014 Gaza War; Gaza war

Production history
- Designer: Rabintex Industries Ltd
- Designed: 1970s
- Manufacturer: Rabintex Industries Ltd; Hagor Industries Ltd; Israeli Weapons Ltd; Marom-Dolphin; Johsen Equipment Company (Singapore); Begadi GmbH (Germany)
- Produced: 1976–present

The Ephod Combat Vest, also designated variously the A10 Model Infantry Load-bearing Rig, Individual Carrying Equipment, and "New style" Load Bearing Equipment, is a personal equipment system issued to the Israel Defense Forces (IDF) of the State of Israel since the mid-1970s. It replaced the modular-based 1950s "Old style" tan-khaki cotton canvas equipment (similar in design to the British Army's 58 pattern webbing) and a variety of load-carrying waistcoats and assault vests used by Israeli infantry and elite units during the 1967 Six-Day War, the 1967-1970 War of Attrition, and the 1973 Yom Kippur War.

== History and development ==
The IDF load-bearing system or Ephod ("apron" or "avantail" in Hebrew) is the direct result of the long experience acquired over the years with the "commando web gear" originally worn by Israeli recon paratroopers during the War of Attrition, who made crude but comfortable Khaki or Olive Green waistcoats and assault vests incorporating many small canvas or Nylon pouches. Known as the "New style" Load Bearing Equipment, the Ephod was designed by the Israeli private firm Rabintex Industries Ltd of Herzeliya near Tel Aviv in 1975–76, who allegedly developed it from an American prototype.

=== Description ===
The "New style" Load Bearing Equipment prototype presented in 1976 by Rabintex was made entirely of olive green (OG) Cordura-type nylon and consisted of wide unpadded shoulder straps or suspenders and an "X"-back harness or "yoke" system fitted with three chest/side and back panels fitted with a detachable foam rubber-padded waist-band or "belt", secured at the front by two strap-and-buckle attachment loops. One novel feature of the Ephod is that its yoke spread the weight to be borne over the shoulders and was not secured to a conventional waist belt. Its suspenders were joined in the area of the shoulder-blades by a lateral piece to which was stitched a rectangular web loop with eyelets for attaching a U.S.-type entrenching tool, a feature also found in the "Old style" web gear suspenders.

Another feature of the Ephod was its wide cushioned waist-band fitted at the back of the panels by snap buttons, which distributed the weight well all around the waist. Many Israeli soldiers in the field had found the canvas material of the IDF standard issue "Old style" web gear and the load they carried to be very uncomfortable, and so wore padding underneath the pistol belt and waist pouches; this aspect was taken into consideration by the designers of the Ephod, who devised a unique system in which the ammunition pouches, the grenade carriers and other equipment rest on three foam rubber pads tied together by parachute cord lacing at four points, allowing infinite adjustment to individual size. Like the front extremities of the yoke, they were not secured to the cushioned waist-band but to the pouches instead.

The pouches came in three sets, left, right, and back. Each consists of a nylon base panel, in which a total of nine integral nylon pouches of five different sizes, comprising four large magazine pouches, two individual hand grenade carriers, one smoke grenade carrier, one First aid kit pouch and one rear pouch for carrying binoculars or night-vision equipment are stitched. All pouch flaps are fitted with Velcro Hook-and-loop fastener strips reinforced by a single metal eyelet and the larger magazine pouches each had at the lower end a nylon frog with two eyelets for additional pouches fitted with US-type M1910 hooks. In addition, the Ephod's back panel has two and the chest/side panels four snap loops for attaching the "Old style" web pistol belt and two detachable canteen pouches.

Designed to be worn over a flak vest, the Ephod Combat Vest is usually worn rather high and it can be put on and off in one piece, like a jacket. Its magazine pouches can hold up to twelve M16, IMI Galil or AK-47 series magazines, along with additional pouches for medical equipment, 7.62mm FN MAG machine gun belts, 40mm rounds and attachments for packs. In addition, the asymmetrical arrangement of ammunition of the Ephod allows increased comfort when in firing position, providing the soldier with an elbow rest when holding a rifle. These characteristics made the Ephod considerably well regarded at the time by some specialists

== Variants ==
=== Second-model Ephod vest ===
A new version of the Ephod was introduced in 1980–81, in which the earlier "X"-harness shoulder yoke was replaced by an "H"-harness with a double strap-and-buckle attachment loop on the front of the carrying straps and on the side pouches' panels, in lieu of the parachute cord lacing adjusters, though the pouches' arrangement remained unchanged.

=== Armoured Corps Web Gear ===
When the Ephod was issued to IDF Armoured Corps crewmen in 1978, they found that the standard combat vest was very cumbersome while operating in the confines of an armoured vehicle, so a special set was developed. Based on the ChiCom AK-47 chest rig, the Ephod HaShan or Ephod Heil HaShiryon ("Armoured Corps web gear" in Hebrew) load-bearing equipment is a variation of the Ephod and consists of four frontal rectangular magazine chest pouches designed specifically for the "sitting" tank soldiers, complete with two regular pouches for rectangular canteens worn on either side.

=== Advanced Ephod ===
The Advanced Ephod is a late-model variant of the classic Israel Defense Forces (IDF) load-bearing combat vest (Ephod/A10 system), originally designed by Rabintex Industries in the mid-1970s

== Combat use ==
=== Israeli service ===
The Ephod made its operational début during the famous Entebbe raid in July 1976 and was introduced the following year into Israeli forces, though its massive use by Israeli troops came only during the 1978 South Lebanon conflict and the subsequent June 1982 Israeli invasion of Lebanon.

=== Latin America ===
The Ephod also began to be marketed to foreign recipients of Israeli military aid in the late 1970s and early 1980s, and the first Latin American country to receive it was Nicaragua in 1977–78. With the adoption of Israeli-made small-arms in 1976, the Somoza Regime ordered substantial quantities of the Ephod to equip the elite and infantry units of its Nicaraguan National Guard. Later during the 1978-79 Nicaraguan Revolution, captured Ephod vests were also worn by Sandinista National Liberation Front (FSLN) guerrillas.

Guatemala also received the Ephod for the Guatemalan Army's Parachute Brigade and Kaibiles, while Ecuador adopted it for its Naval Infantry Corps troops and Peru acquired Ephod vests to equip its Army and Naval Infantry units. Argentina also adopted the Ephod for the Argentine Army's 8th Mountain Cazadores Company of the 8th Mountain Infantry Brigade.

=== Middle East ===
During the Lebanese Civil War, the pro-Israeli militias in Lebanon, the Christian Lebanese Forces (LF) and the South Lebanon Army (SLA) also began to receive the Ephod in substantial quantities to equip their troops at the late 1970s, with captured examples eventually finding their way into the hands of militiamen from other Lebanese factions throughout the 1980s and 1990s. Photographic evidence taken at the time do show the Israeli combat vest being used by fighters from the Christian Marada Brigade, the Shia Amal Movement and Hezbollah, the Druze People's Liberation Army (PLA), the Syrian Social Nationalist Party (SSNP), the Lebanese Army and even the Syrian Army Commando troops stationed in the Country. The vest proved so popular during the War that the Lebanese soon began producing an unlicensed local copy, which was adopted in the mid-1990s by the Lebanese Army as standard web gear for its infantry troops and elite forces, such as the Lebanese Commando Regiment, the Counter-sabotage Regiment, the Lebanese Airborne Regiment and the Republican Guard Brigade.

Recently, Lebanese-produced Ephod vests have been encountered among regular soldiers of the Syrian Army and their adversaries of the Free Syrian Army and other rebel factions currently engaged in the ongoing civil war in Syria.

Iran also produces its own version of the Ephod since the 1980s, and Iranian soldiers were currently seen using clones of the vest, along with many other harnesses.

=== Asia ===
The Sri Lanka Army (SLA) adopted in the 1980s-1990s the Ephod for its infantry, commando and special forces units equipped with the AKM assault rifle, who battled the Liberation Tigers of Tamil Eelam (LTTE) insurgency during the Sri Lankan civil war (1983-2009).

In the early to mid-1990s, the Singapore Armed Forces (SAF) began to introduce their own version of the Ephod, known as the Skeletal Battle Order (SBO), for its infantry units. Manufactured primarily by the Johsen Equipment Company of Singapore, the early models were direct copies of the original Israeli combat vest, featuring four large magazine pouches capable of accommodating eight 30-round M16S1 assault rifle magazines, two narrow side pouches meant to store pen flares, two hand grenade carriers, one smoke grenade carrier, and a small butt-pack with two smaller side pouches. Later models of the SBO combat vest replaced the metal size adjusters in the suspenders and side panels with plastic buckles, and featured larger magazine pouches designed to hold the new plastic magazines for the SAR 21 assault rifle which were more voluminous than those of the M16S1. The Ephod-based SBO continued to be issued to SAF infantry battalions until 2006–2007, when it was replaced a new model of load-bearing vest (LBV) based on the MOLLE/Pouch Attachment Ladder System (PALS).

=== Africa ===
Photos have documented Ephod clones produced in Cuban "grey-lizard" camouflage being used by Cuban FAR forces during the Angolan Civil War and the South African Border War in the 1980s. These appear to have been produced in limited numbers and were not widely issued.

=== Europe ===
The Italian Army adopted the Ephod in the early 1990s and issued it as standard web gear for the paratroopers of the Folgore Airborne Brigade deployed at the Iraqi Kurdistan in the cadre of Operation Provide Comfort on April–July 1991. The pathfinder (Italian: Incursori) unit of the Folgore Brigade later employed the Ephod in combat when they participated in Operation Silver Back in April 1994, the joint multi-national effort to evacuate foreign nationals from Kigali, Rwanda's capital city, during the Rwandan Civil War. The Ephod has also been extensively used by the Army's special force unit, the 9th Airborne Assault Rgt. "Col Moschin", during the mid to late 1990s NATO missions in the Balkans (IFOR and KFOR). From the end of the 1990s the Naval Infantry Regiment "San Marco" had also adopted a locally produced variant of the Ephod (distinguished by the presence of a holster on the right side in place of a magazine pouch) which it retained until 2005 (approximately) when newer vests have been adopted for combat use, although it remained in use for training purposes until 2010.

The French Armed Forces elite units of the Special Operations Command deployed to Rwanda in the cadre of Opération Turquoise on June–August 1994 were photographed wearing a unique set of Load Bearing Equipment remarkably similar in design to the Israeli Ephod Combat Vest.

The Estonian Land Forces adopted in the mid-1990s a locally designed set of Load Bearing Equipment inspired by the Ephod for its infantry units armed with the IMI Galil assault rifle.

The Croatian Forces seen with Ephod vests during Operation Maslenica in 1993.

A number of Ephod vests were sent to the Federal Republic of Yugoslavia in 1998 as aid from Israel, subsequently being issued to the Serbian Special Police Units during the Kosovo War. After the conflict, all the Ephod vests seem to have been transferred to the Special Operations Unit of the former Yugoslavian State Security Service (RDB), where they were mostly used for training purposes. Upon the disbandment of the Special Operations Unit, the fate of the Ephod vests becomes unknown; while some were seen being worn by the Serbian Gendarmerie, they were quickly retired from service and only a few examples remain in use.

== Users ==
- Argentina: used by the Mountain Cazadores.
- Ecuador: used by the Naval Infantry Corps.
- El Salvador: used by the Salvadoran Army.
- Estonia: used by the Estonian Land Forces.
- France: used by the Special Operations Command units.
- Guatemala: used by the Parachute Brigade and Kaibiles.
- Indonesia: used by the Indonesian Army Raider Battalions.
- Italy: used by the Folgore Brigade Paratroopers.
- Lebanon: used by the Lebanese Armed Forces.
- Palestine: used by the Palestinian National Security Forces (PNSF).
- Peru: used by the Peruvian Armed Forces and Peruvian Naval Infantry.
- Syria: used by the Syrian Army Commandos.
- Sri Lanka: used by the Sri Lanka Army.

=== Non-state users ===
- Arab Democratic Party (Lebanon): Used captured vests from the Lebanese Forces between 1983 and 1990, and locally made copies.
- Free Syrian Army: Used Lebanese-produced copies.
- Hamas (Izz ad-Din al-Qassam Brigades): used captured vests from the IDF and PNSF, and locally made copies.
- Hezbollah: used captured vests from the Lebanese Forces, SLA, and IDF between 1983 and 2000, and locally made copies.
- Islamic Unification Movement in Lebanon (Tawheed): locally made copies.
- Palestine (PLO armed factions in Lebanon, the Gaza Strip, and the West Bank): used captured vests from the Lebanese Forces, SLA, IDF, and PNSF, and locally made copies.

=== Former users ===
- Amal Movement: used captured vests from the Lebanese Forces, SLA, and IDF between 1983 and 2000, and locally made copies.
- Croatia
- Cuba: Locally produced clones used in the 1980s during Cuba's military intervention in Angola.
- Federal Republic of Yugoslavia: used by the Serbian Special Police Units during the Kosovo War, being used afterwards by the Special Operations Unit of the former Yugoslavian State Security Service (RDB) for training purposes, and briefly by the Serbian Gendarmerie between 1998 and 2003.
- Israel: used by the Israel Defense Forces and Israeli security forces. Replaced mainly with modern Plate Carriers though still being used by rear echelon troops.
- Marada Brigade: Used captured vests from the Lebanese Forces between 1982 and 1990.
- Nicaragua: Used by the National Guard between 1977 and 1979.
- Lebanese Forces: provided by Israel between 1978 and 1993.
- People's Liberation Army (Lebanon): used captured vests from the Lebanese Forces between 1983 and 1993.
- Sandinista National Liberation Front (FSLN): used captured vests from the Nicaraguan National Guard between 1978 and 1979.
- Singapore: locally made SBO versions used by the Singapore Armed Forces between 1995 and 2007.
- South Lebanon Army (SLA): Provided by Israel between 1978 and 2000.
- Syrian Social Nationalist Party in Lebanon (Eagles of the Whirlwind): used captured vests from the Lebanese Forces, SLA, and IDF between 1983 and 1990, and locally made copies.

== Gallery ==
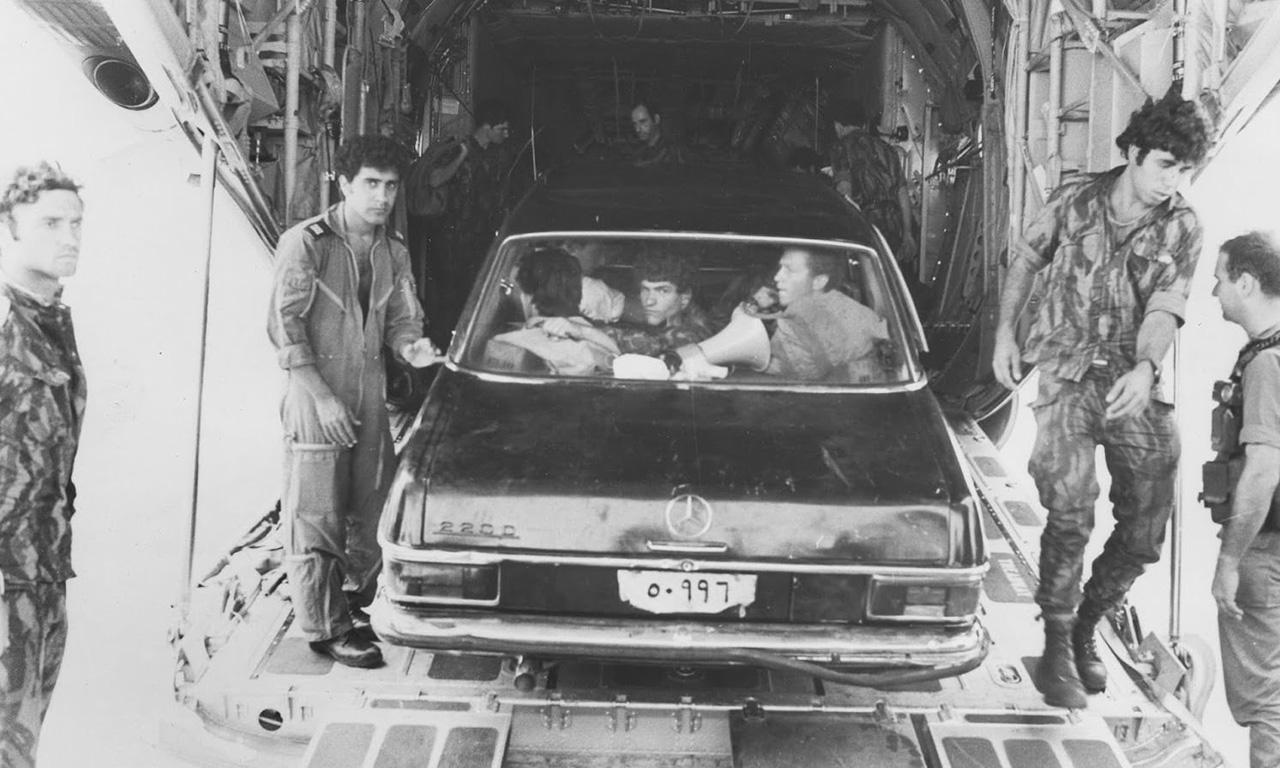
Israeli commandos from the Sayeret Matkal desembarking in Israel after Entebbe raid in July 1976, with the operator on the right wearing the first model of the Ephod Combat Vest.

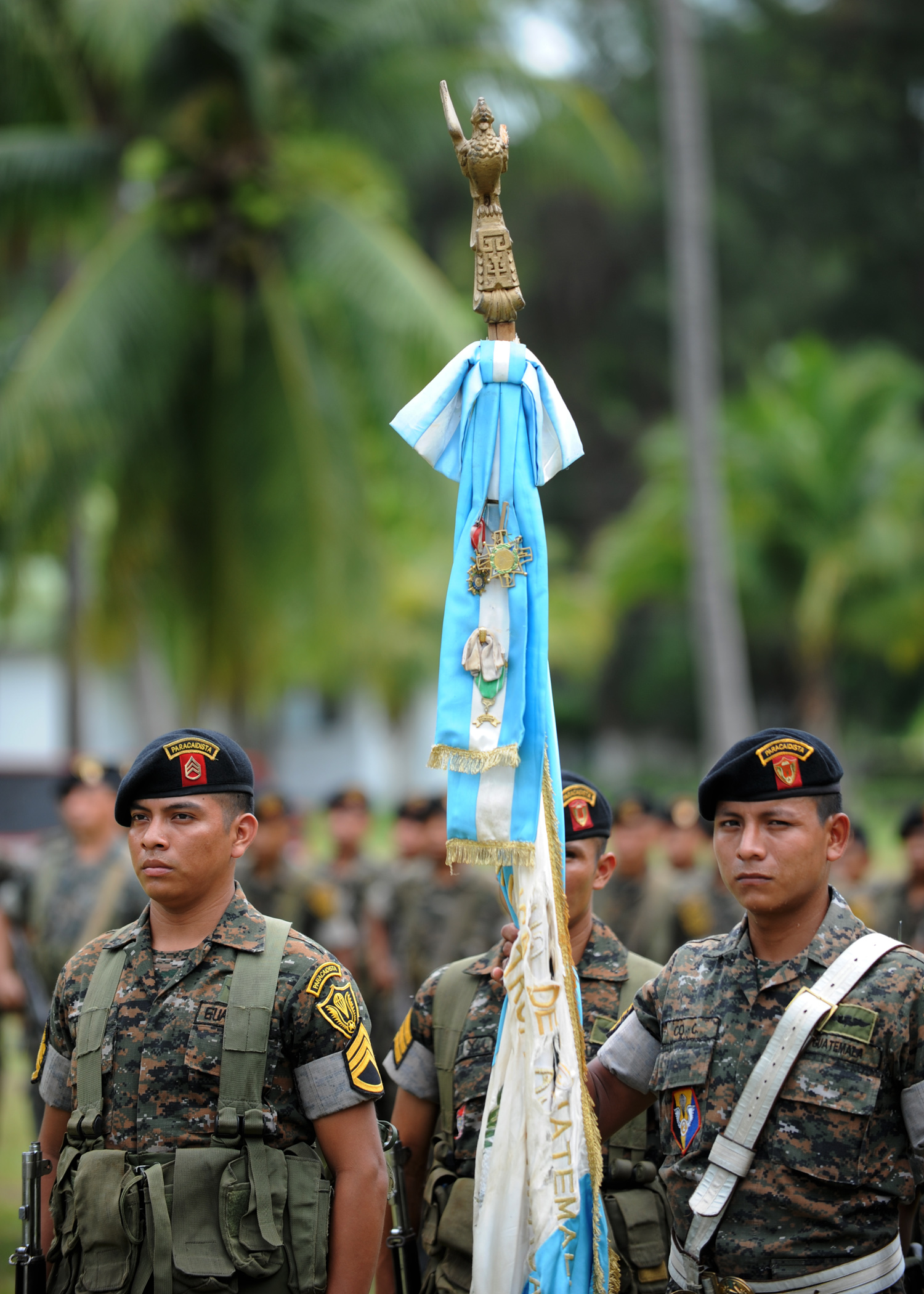
Guatemalan paratroopers from the Parachute Brigade wearing the Ephod Combat Vest parade in Puerto San José, Guatemala, 30 June 2011.

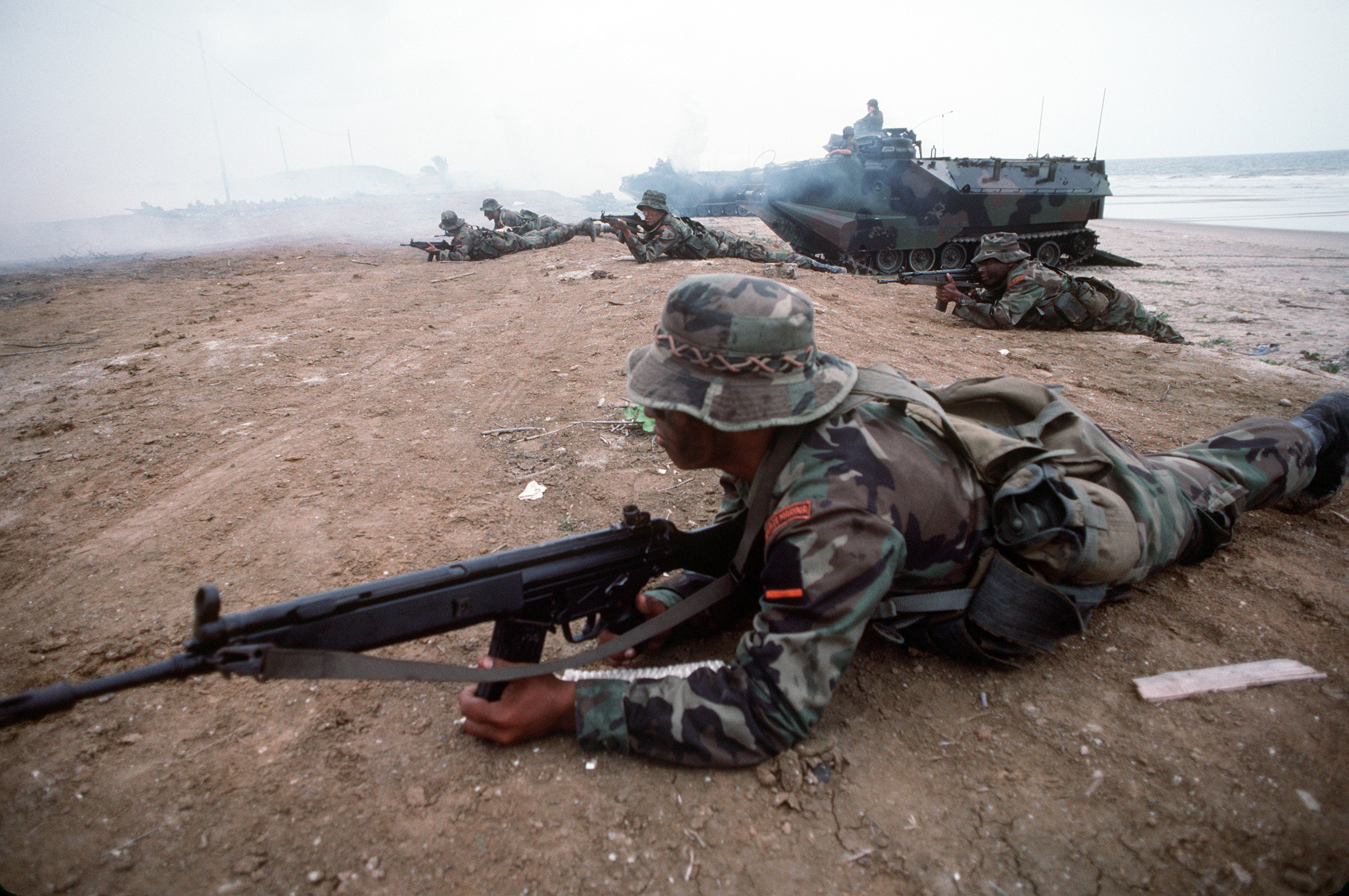
An Ecuadorian Marine wearing an Ephod Combat Vest during an amphibious assault exercise (UNITAS), 13 August 1991.

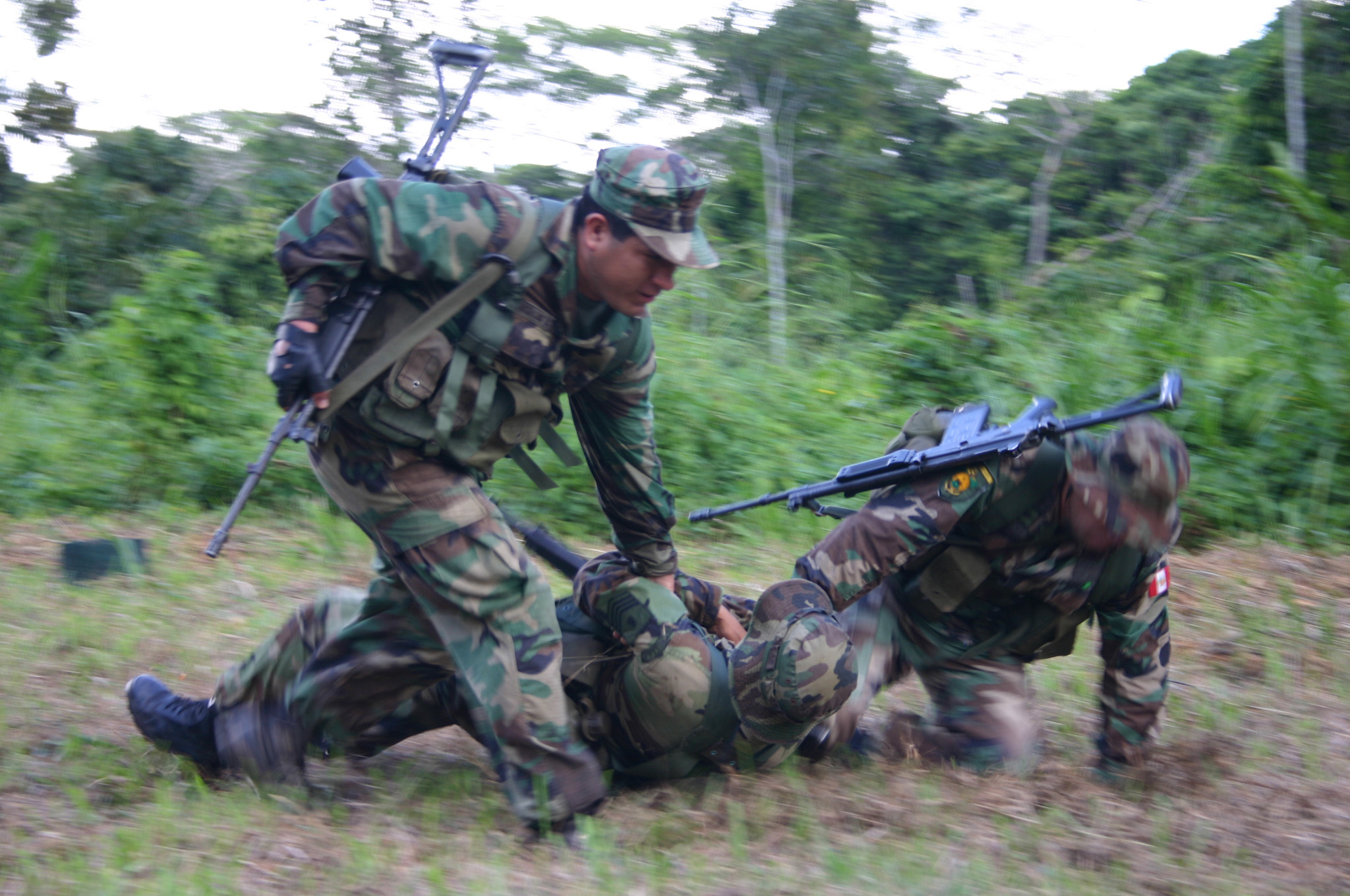
Peruvian marines during a training exercise wearing Ephod Combat Vests and armed with the 7.62mm Galil assault rifle, 12 June 2008.

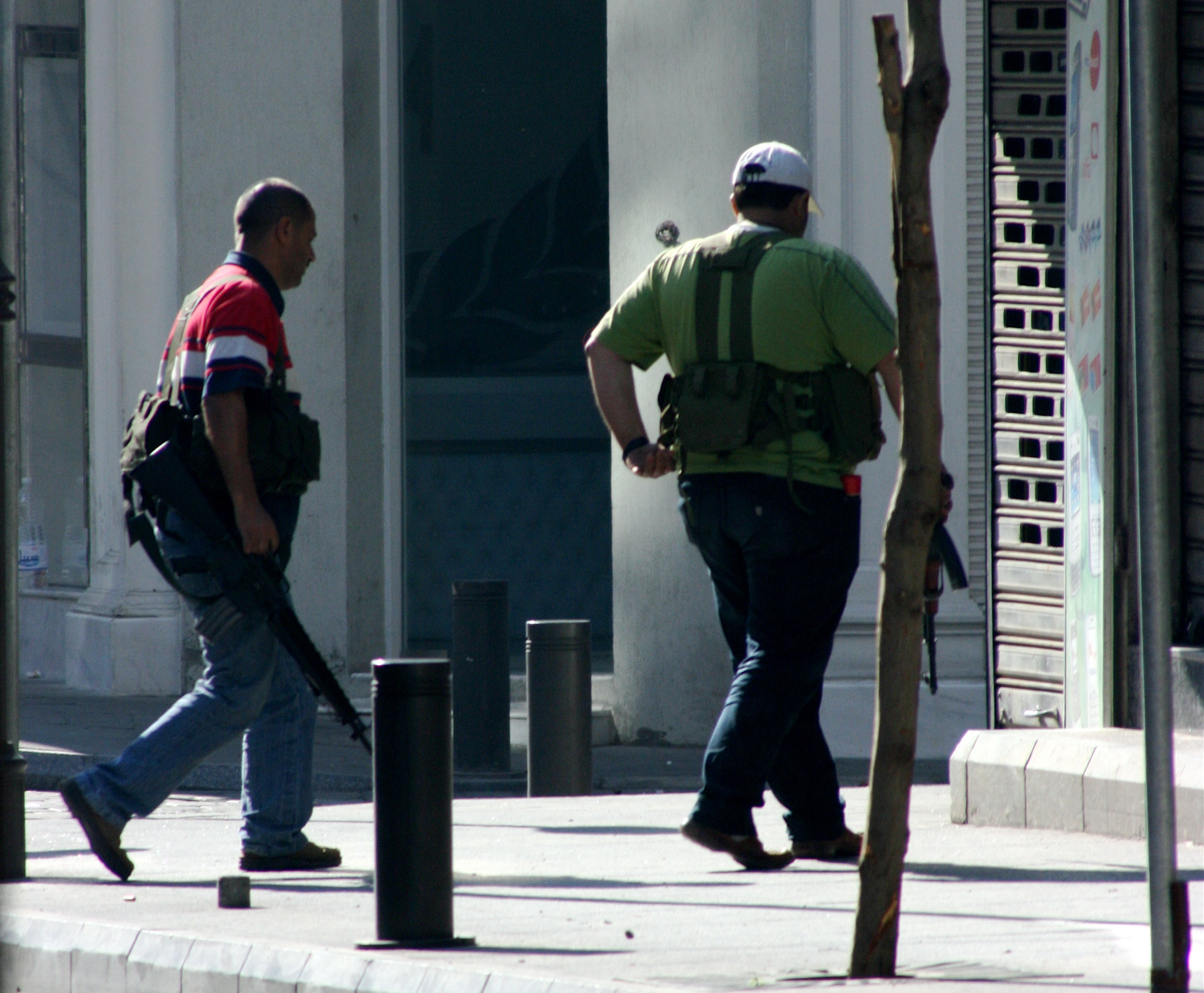
Armed Lebanese militiamen wearing locally produced Ephod Combat Vests running for cover near the Crown Plaza Hotel on the Hamra district in Beirut during the 2008 Lebanon conflict.

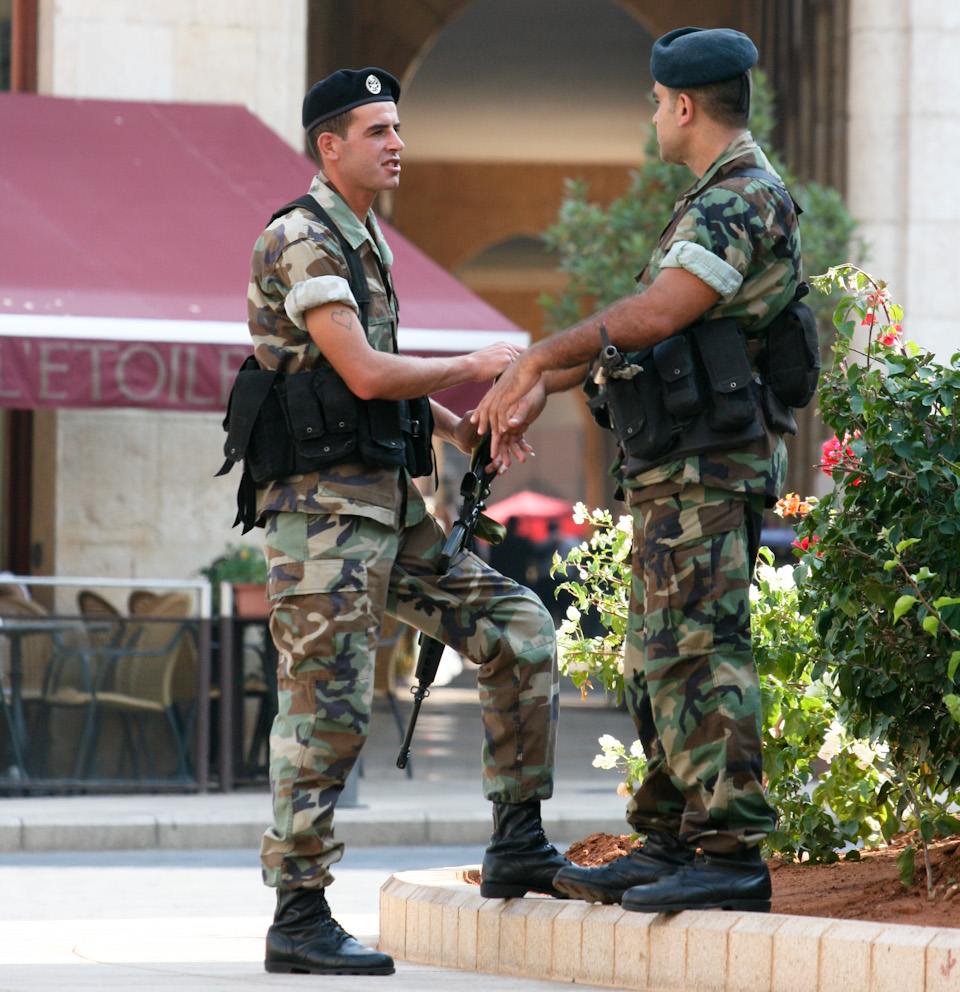
Lebanese Army soldiers on patrol wearing locally made black Ephod Combat Vests, Beirut, 20 August 2009.

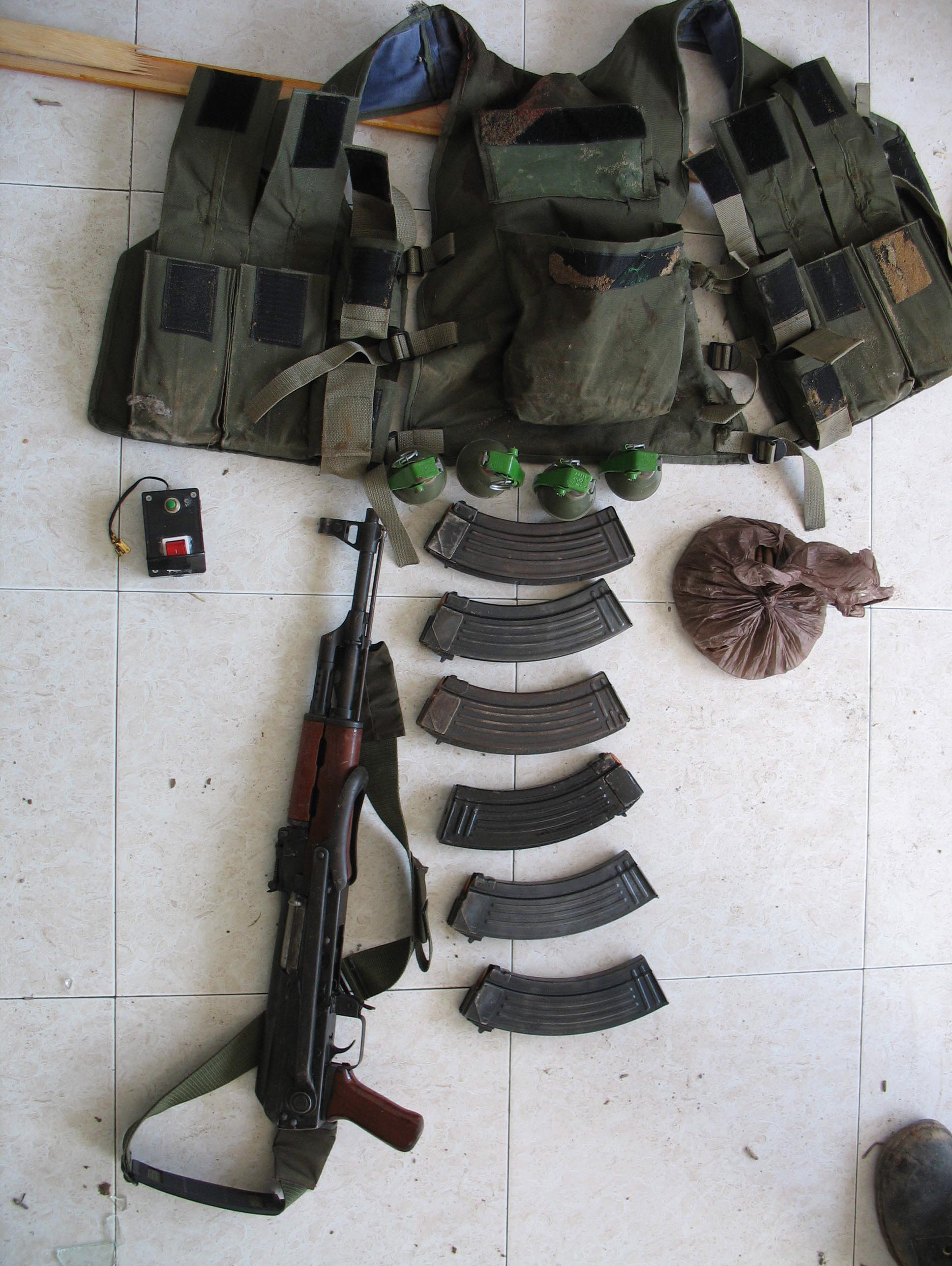
An example of a Palestinian-manufactured Ephod Combat Vest found at a Hamas weapons cache in northern Gaza, during the Gaza War (2008–09).

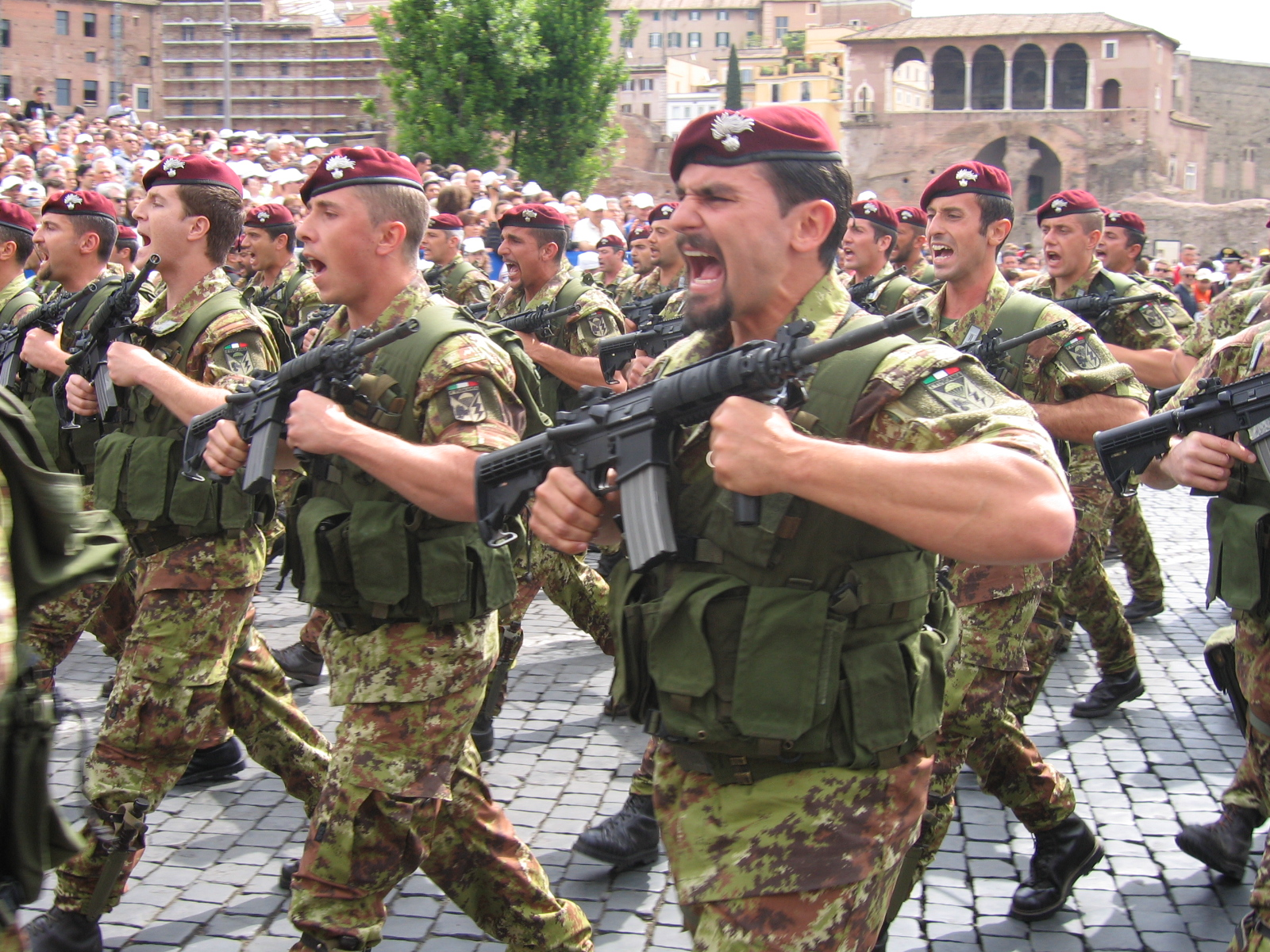
Italian paratroopers from the 1st Carabinieri Regiment "Tuscania" parade in Rome, equipped with late-generation Ephod vests, 2 June 2006.

== See also ==
- Doobon coat
- OR-201
