= Kaibiles =

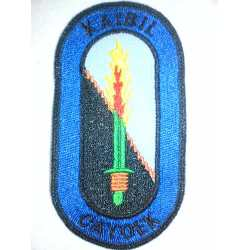
- Founded: 5 December 1974; 51 years ago
- Country: Guatemala
- Branch: Guatemalan Army
- Type: Special operations force
- Size: Brigade
- Garrison/HQ: Poptún, Petén Department
- Mottos: "If I advance, follow me. If I stop, urge me on. If I retreat, kill me."

The Kaibiles are a special operations wing of the Armed Forces of Guatemala. They specialize in jungle warfare tactics and counter-insurgency operations. Since 1974, more than 1,250 soldiers have graduated from the international training programme, which has a duration of eight weeks. Of this number, 85% were Guatemalan soldiers.

The corps' soldiers are distinguished from regular troops by maroon berets with patches bearing a blazing sword. Its motto, inspired by Henri de la Rochejaquelein, is: "If I advance, follow me. If I stop, urge me on. If I retreat, kill me."

== History ==
On 5 December 1974, Guatemala's military government created its Commando School (Escuela de Comandos). Three months later it renamed it the Kaibil Special Operations Training Centre (Centro de Adiestramiento y Operaciones Especiales Kaibil). The name "Kaibil" is derived from Kayb'il B'alam (Kaibil Balam), a Mam indigenous leader who evaded capture by the Spanish conquistadors under Pedro de Alvarado.

Initially, the Kaibil Centre was located on two estates, El Infierno ("Hell") and La Pólvora ("Gunpowder") in the municipality of Melchor de Mencos, Petén department. On 12 January 1989, it was moved to the former headquarters of Military Zone 23, in Poptún, Petén.

== Training ==
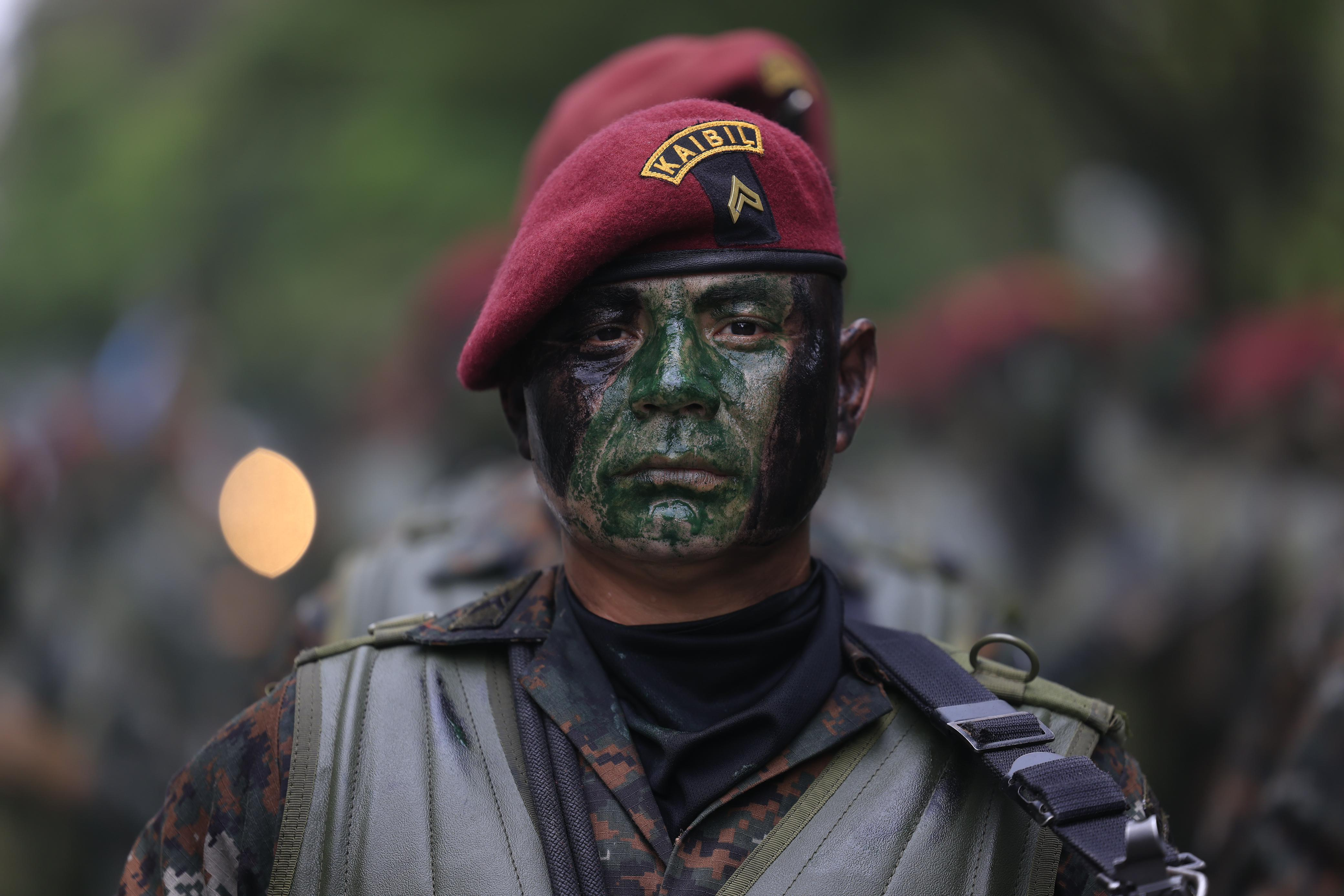
Kaibil at a military parade in Guatemala City, 2 July 2024.

According to the Ministry of Defence, the Kaibil Centre's mission is to train and develop elite commando forces: "To select, by means of arduous, difficult training under physical and mental pressure, members of the army capable of engaging in commando operations."

Recruitment is voluntary. However, several physical and psychological tests are required before entering. The training is given twice a year and lasts 60 days. Only 64 participants are allowed per training period, not older than 28 years of age. No more than 10 have graduated on a single period. Members of foreign military forces are sometimes selected to participate in training.

The commandos are trained in guerrilla warfare, counter-guerrilla operations, military behaviour, map reading, psychological preparation, military intelligence and counter-intelligence. Their training includes a special hand-to-hand combat system known as Temv-K'a (which means "Hands of Storm"), communications, survival techniques, obstacle courses, military hiking, special weapons, demolitions and emergency medical training. This includes aerial operations, day and night navigation, camp setup and security, evasion, escape, interventions and ambushes.

Training is extremely physically and mentally demanding, and takes place during both daytime and nighttime. Sleep is permitted for no longer than three hours a day, but only if the right is earned. The right to eat must also be earned; before being allowed to eat, soldiers must successfully climb a rope, do five pull-ups, ten push-ups and run two miles in 18 minutes or less wearing full combat gear, then duck walk to the mess hall, after which they are given 30 seconds to eat.

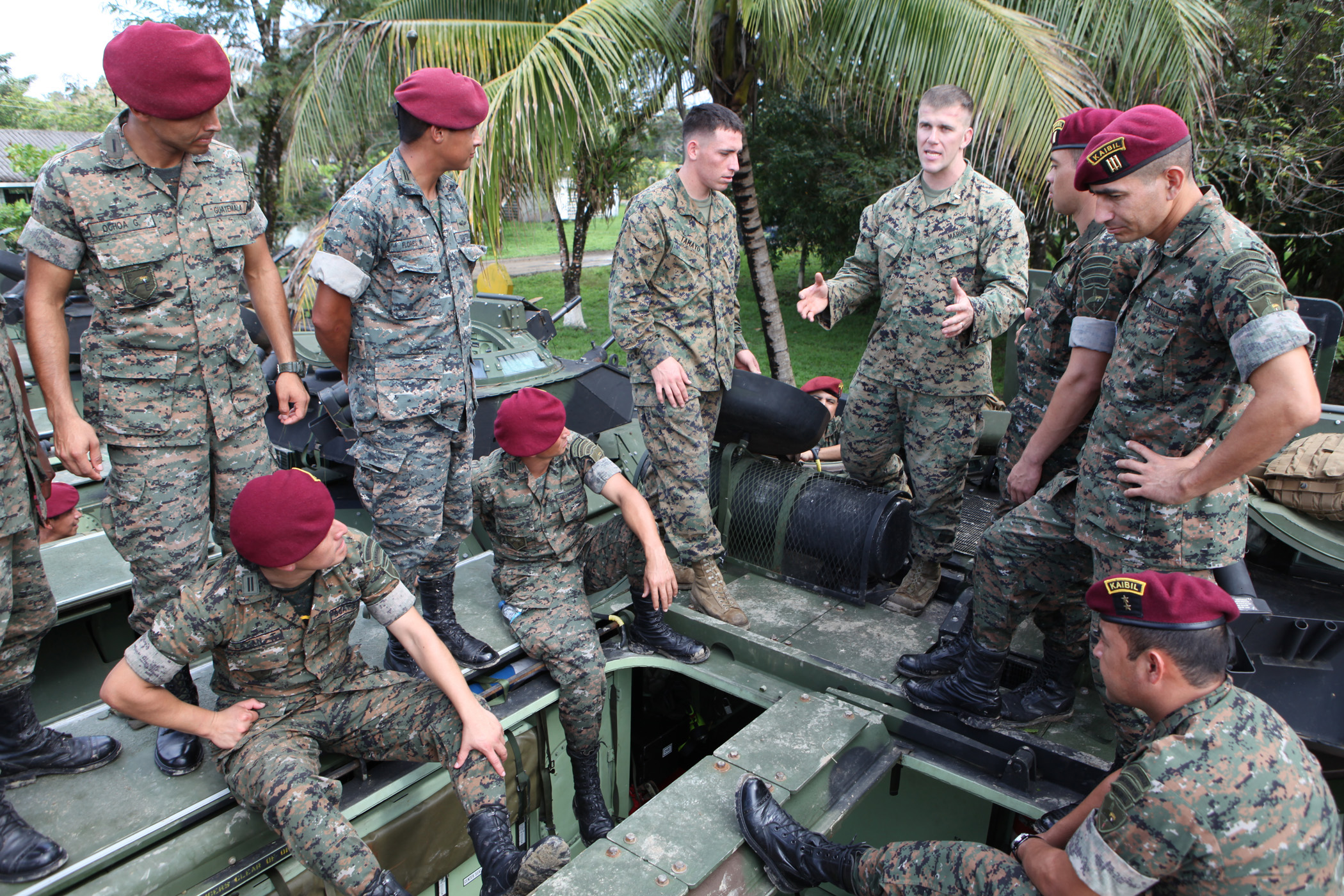
US Marines and Kaibiles during Southern Partnership Station 2011

The first stage of training, which lasts 21 days, consists of theory instructions and practical military training, where the military and morale levels of a candidate are tested. It is followed by hard military training in the jungle, which includes instruction in jungle warfare as well as demolition and detection and deactivation of landmines, scuba diving, waterborne operations, construction of improvised training, SERE training, basic air mobile techniques, small-unit patrols, react to contact, and ambush training. In addition, cadets are exposed to prisoner of war camp situations and survival courses. During the last stage, they are trained to eat "anything that moves", including snakes and ants, as well as roots, to collect dew drops from leaves, as well as how to execute annihilation attacks, intelligence maneuvers, and penetration into enemy territory. During this stage, candidates must patrol through thorn-filled brush wearing nothing but underwear, roll around in thorns to fortify the body to pain, and spend two days in neck-deep water without sleeping in extreme tropical heat. This stage is called El Infierno ("Hell").

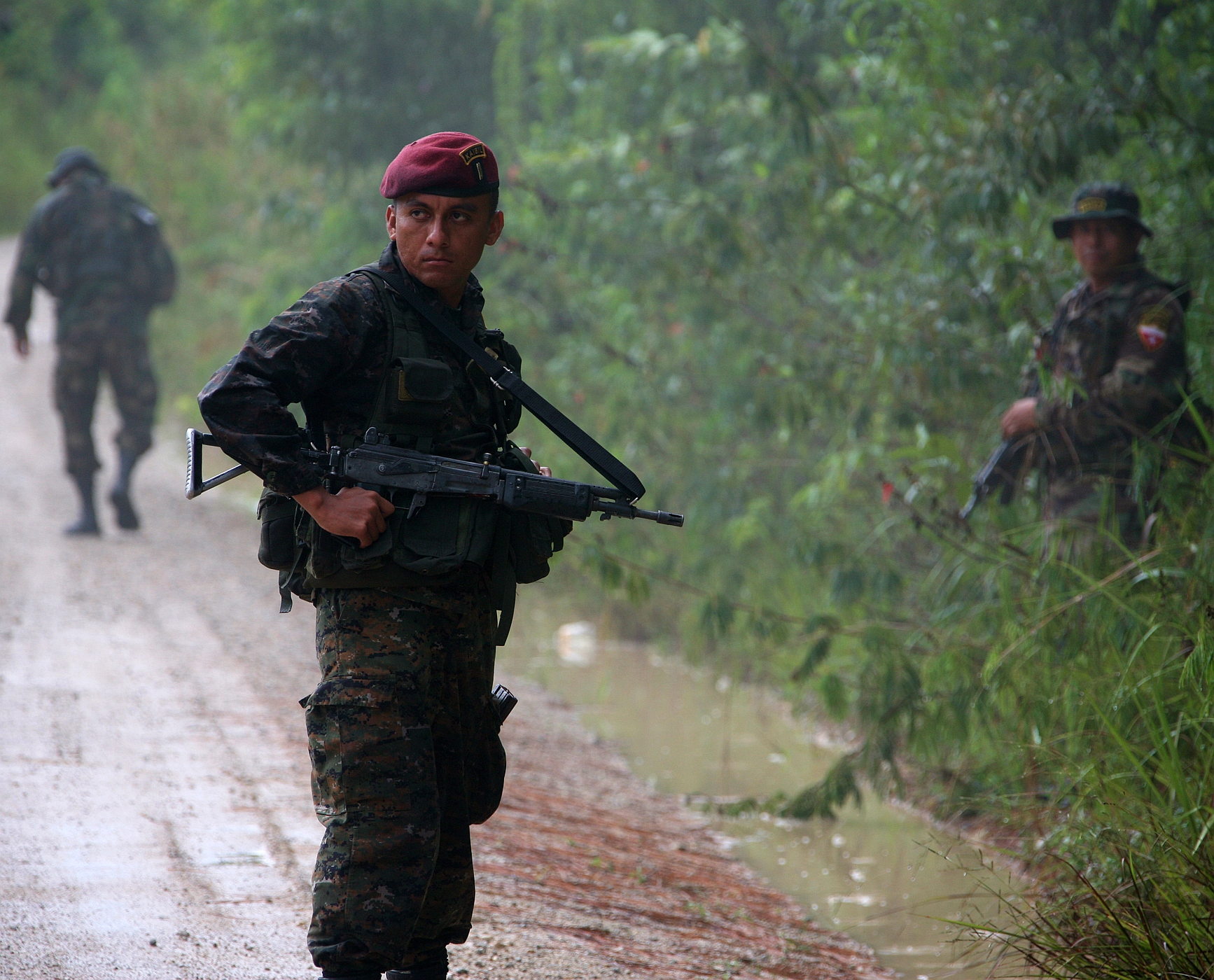
Kaibil special forces on a training mission in Poptún.

During training, every soldier has a cuas (which in Q'eqchi' means "brother" and spanish words of: "Compañerismo, Union, Apoyo, Seguridad") assigned for the rest of their training. They become partners: they sleep, eat, and work together all the time. If one makes a mistake, they are both punished for it.

The Kaibiles are infamous for their reputed practice of forcing recruits to kill animals, which includes raising a puppy and bonding with it before killing and eating it, as well as biting the heads off live chickens. In addition, recruits perform field surgery on themselves, and are forced to drink water out of recently fired artillery shells. As part of the course's finishing ritual, every recruit must drink "Bomb", a mix of tequila, whisky, rum, beer, water and gunpowder, served in a bamboo glass with a bayonet tied to it. Soldiers must drink it carefully, so as not to get drunk and cut themselves with the bayonet. Once they successfully complete this ritual, they are inducted into the Kaibiles.

Even though in the past they were meant to be an anti-guerrilla unit, today they are oriented towards anti-terrorism, anti-kidnapping and anti-narcotics efforts, in line with current needs.

=== Human rights issues ===
In February 1999, the Commission for Historical Clarification (Comisión para el Esclaracimiento Histórico, CEH), the truth and reconciliation body established under United Nations auspices by the 1996 Peace Accords that brought an end to the country's 35-year-long Civil War, called attention to the brutalising nature of the training conducted by the Kaibil Centre in its final report, Guatemala: Memoria del silencio ("Guatemala: Memory of Silence"):

The substantiation of the degrading contents of the training of the Army's special counter insurgency force, known as Kaibiles, has drawn the particular attention of the CEH. This training included killing animals and then eating them raw and drinking their blood in order to demonstrate courage. The extreme cruelty of these training methods, according to testimony available to the CEH, was then put into practice in a range of operations carried out by these troops, confirming one point of their decalogue: "The Kaibil is a killing machine."

The commission's report documented examples of massacres of civilians by the Kaibiles, most notably the December 1982 Dos Erres massacre.

In December 1996, shortly before the signing of the Peace Accords, President Álvaro Arzú spoke of his intention to preserve the Kaibiles in peacetime but to rededicate them to another war: the war on narcotics and crime. Addressing a Kaibil graduation ceremony in Poptún, he said: "Now this new army of peace will face an enemy that perhaps is much more powerful than the one we faced for many years. We are talking of drug traffickers and criminals who want to corrode the country; they are better armed, equipped, and trained than the enemies we had to face in the past." However, under the terms of the Peace Accords, the army was to have been restricted to defence from external attack, which would preclude involvement in the sort of domestic police actions proposed by President Arzú.

The Kaibiles' record and reputation led the Roman Catholic Church's Interdiocese Project for the Recovery of Historical Memory (Proyecto Interdiocesano de Recuperación de la Memoria Histórica, REMHI) to recommend that the group be disbanded in its April 1998 report, "Guatemala: Never Again" (Guatemala: Nunca Más).

According to Jane's Intelligence Review "The army has refused to disband the Special Forces Training and Operations Centre, housed at El Infierno, in the vicinity of Poptún, Petén." In December 1998, Jane's reported that there were three groups of Kaibiles, one consisting of instructors, and two consisting of 162 commandos apiece. Each group was divided into four 38-men platoons, further subdivided into squads of 9 soldiers.

== Recent history ==
=== United Nations Peacekeeping ===
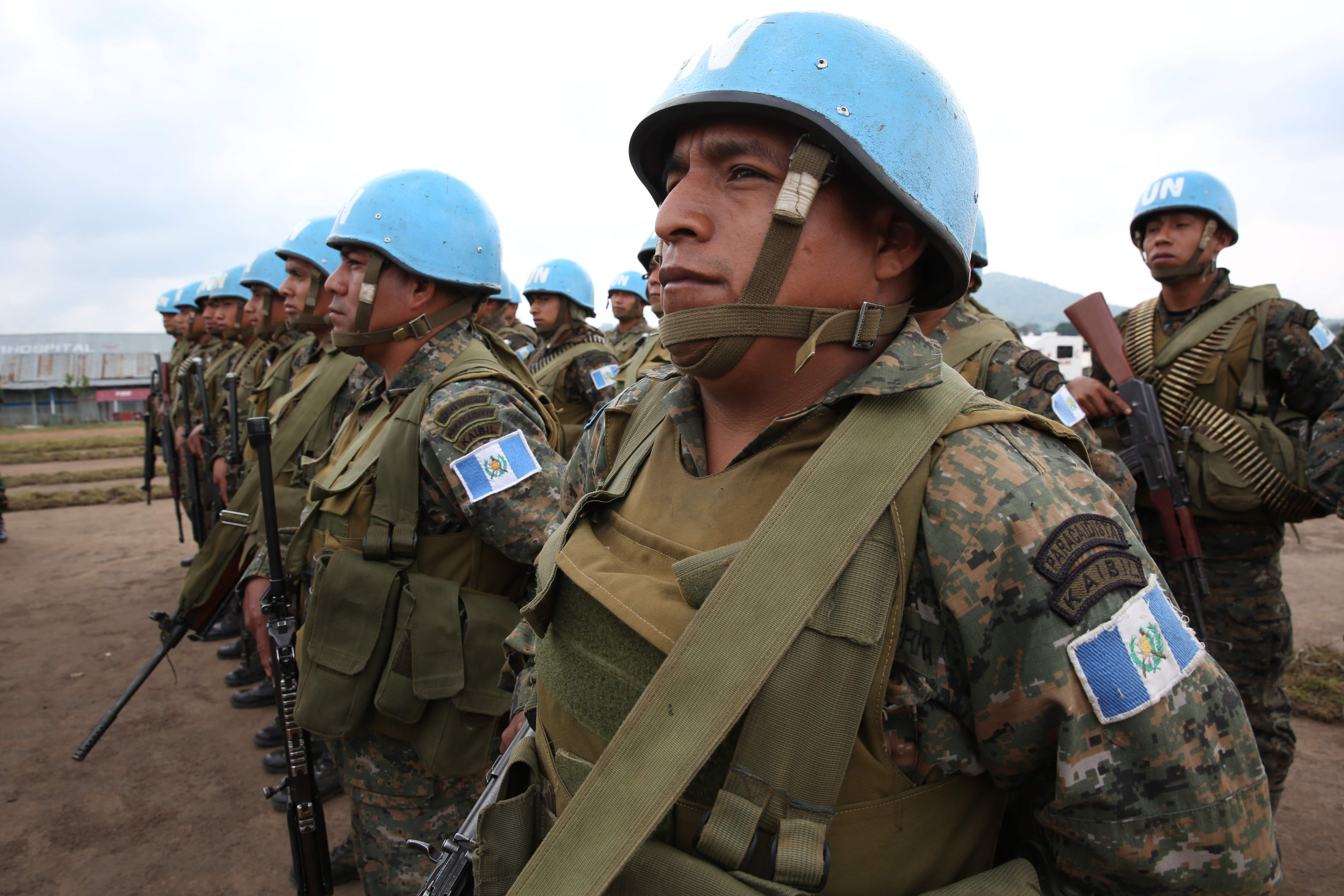
Kaibiles serving as UN peacekeepers as part of MONUSCO in the Congo

Currently there are Kaibiles stationed in the Democratic Republic of the Congo as part of the United Nations MONUSCO peacekeeping force. On 23 January 2006, a unit of 80 Kaibiles failed in an attempt to capture Vincent Otti, the deputy commander of Uganda's Lord's Resistance Army, in Congo's Garamba National Park. Eight Kaibiles and at least fifteen guerrillas were killed in the resulting gunfight.

=== Drug cartel membership ===
More recently, it has been alleged, some former members of the Kaibiles have formed relationships with the Los Zetas drug cartel. Los Zetas are a group of elite Mexican paratroopers and intelligence operatives who deserted their Special Air Mobile Force Group in 1999 and have since been hired as "enforcers" by the drugs traffickers of the Gulf Cartel. However, Los Zetas now operates as an independent organization since its rupture from the Gulf Cartel in early 2010.

== See also ==
- Ephod Combat Vest
- OR-201
