= Kaybʼil Bʼalam =

16th century Mayan ruler

Kaybʼil Bʼalam (alternatively written Kaibil Balam) was a 16th-century leader of the Mam people in the Maya kingdom in the western highlands of Guatemala. During the time of the Spanish invasion, the Mam population was mainly situated in Xinabahul (now modern-day Huehuetenango). However, due to the Spanish conquest, the people returned to the stone fortifications of Zaculeu for protection.

The city was attacked in 1525 by conquistador Gonzalo de Alvarado y Contreras, brother of Pedro de Alvarado. Kaybʼil Bʼalam and his warriors successfully repelled the attempted siege by the Spanish forces for several months until being forced to surrender after being reduced to the verge of starvation.

In 1975, the Guatemalan Army created a special operations force, the Kaibiles, named after Kaybʼil Bʼalam. The group is centered out of Huehuetenango ("Land of the Old") some 5 km from the original stand off site at Zaculeu.
