= OR-201 =

Kevlar combat helmet developed in Israel

Kasda OR-201
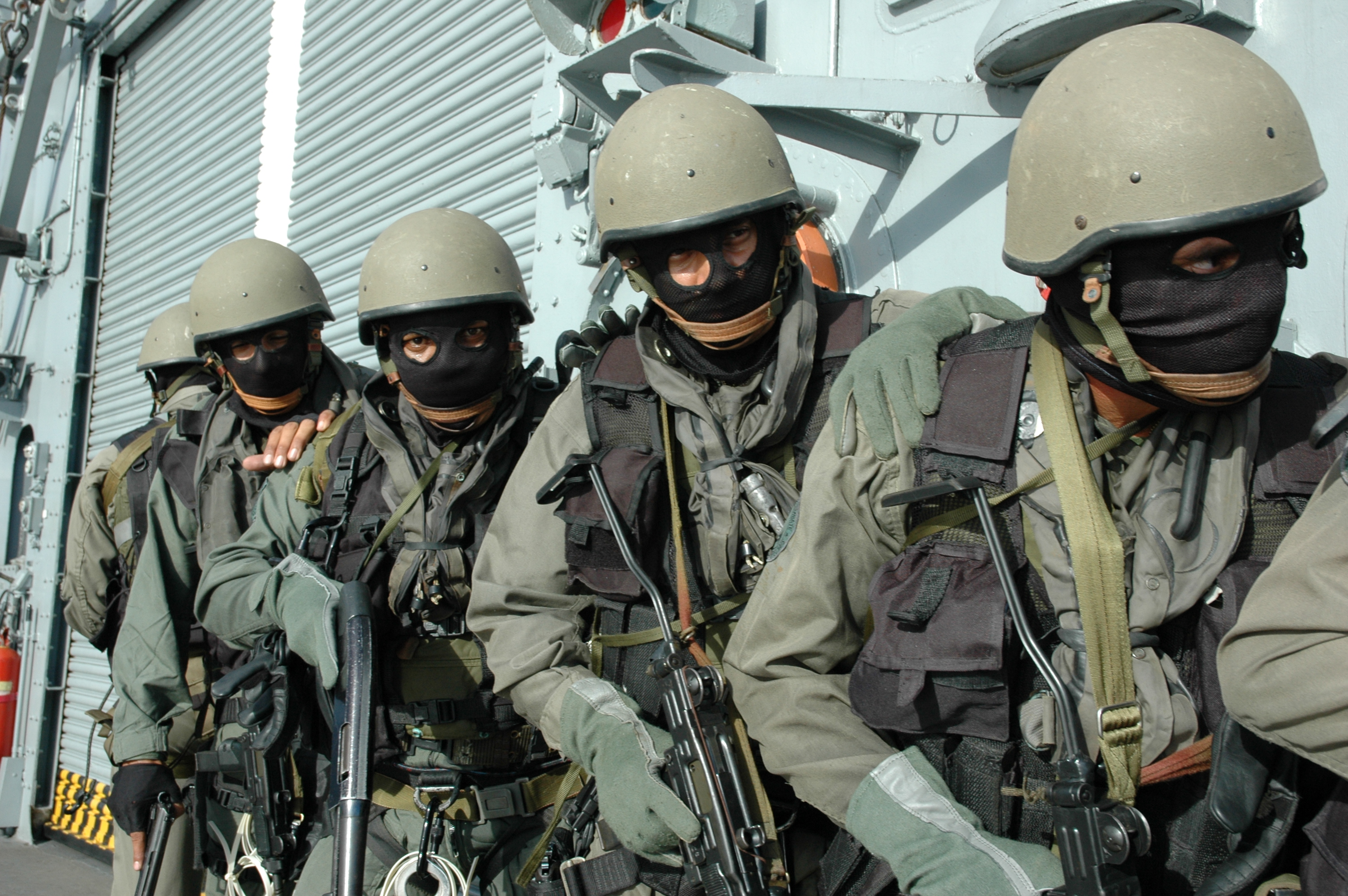
- Brazilian Navy GRUMEC frogmen wearing OR-201 helmets during a boarding exercise, 2006
- Type: Combat Helmet
- Place of origin: Israel

Service history
- Used by: See Users
- Wars: Operation Entebbe; 1978 South Lebanon conflict 1982 Lebanon War; Lebanese Civil War; 1978-79 Nicaraguan Revolution; Guatemalan Civil War; Salvadoran Civil War; Internal conflict in Peru; Sri Lankan Civil War; South African Border War; The Troubles; Cenepa War; First Intifada; Al-Aqsa Intifada; South Lebanon conflict (1985–2000); Dinnieh clashes 2013 Sidon clash Bab al-Tabbaneh–Jabal Mohsen conflict 2000–2006 Shebaa Farms conflict 2006 Lebanon War; 2007 Lebanon conflict 2008 conflict in Lebanon; Battle of Gaza (2007); Gaza War (2008–09); 2014 Israel–Gaza conflict Gaza war

Production history
- Designer: Orlite Industries Ltd
- Designed: 1970s
- Manufacturer: Orlite Industries Ltd; Hagor Industries Ltd; Rabintex Industries Ltd; SAPHI (South Africa)
- Produced: 1976-Present
- Variants: See Variants

The OR-201, also designated Kasda OR-201 Model 76 or M-76 for short, is a combat helmet of Israeli origin. Developed in the 1970s, the OR-201 was one of the world's first ballistic helmets. It was subsequently exported on a large scale and has been used by many militaries worldwide.

== History and development ==
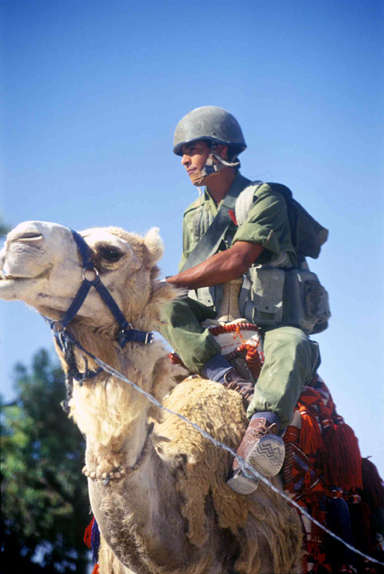
IDF soldier wearing a OR-201 helmet patrolling on a camel, June 1993.

The OR-201 helmet was developed in the early 1970s by the Israeli private firm Orlite Engineering Company (now Orlite Industries Ltd) of Ness Ziona near Tel-Aviv, and is the direct result of experience acquired with the steel types – the British Brodie helmet Mark II/Mark III, RAC Mk II modified helmet with chin web jump harness (used by paratroopers and similar to the HSAT Mk II/Mk III paratrooper helmets), US M1 helmet, and French Modèle 1951 helmet – previously worn by Israeli infantry and airborne troops from the late 1940s to the mid-1970s and early 1980s.

=== Variants ===
==== Model 76 ====
The prototype presented in 1976 by Orlite consisted of one-piece, glass-reinforced plastic (GRP) round shell 8mm thick, made of fiberglass fibers placed in an ethyl cellulose resin under high pressure. It had a black rubber rim-band 10mm thick and seven metal rivets – one placed at the front, four at the sides, and two at the back – to secure a helmet liner of "cradle" type. As the name implies, it consists of three 25mm Khaki-green synthetic fabric crossed straps attached to a very light tan head-band (or sweat-band) that is fitted within a cushion of four inner black high-density neoprene foam pads – two side, one front, and one rear – that help to secure the helmet in the wearer's head, while providing an impact- and shock-absorbing capability. The liner suspension is adjustable from medium to large using a metal buckle in the rear.

Copied after the HSAT Mk II paratrooper helmet harness, the chin-strap system is fitted directly to the helmet shell at three points by rectangular metal rings; made of 20mm Khaki-green synthetic canvas web, the harness is equipped with two metal friction buckles at the chin-straps and is reinforced by an integral tan leather chin-cup.

With a weight of 1.65 kg, the OR-201 is light, comfortable, and sturdy, being capable of stopping a 9mm round at close range. Production helmets, including those made for the export market, usually came in a smooth Khaki-grey, Khaki-brown or Khaki-green finish.

==== Model 76-85 ====
This helmet, also designated M76/85, OR 202-76 or OR-402, was introduced in 1985 as an improved variant of the earlier Model 76, which consists of one-piece, ballistic nylon or reinforced fiberglass and plastic Kevlar composite structure that weights 1.65 kg. In contrast to its predecessor, the Model 76-85 had its interior lined entirely by light tan fiberglass fabric and a shock-absorbing neoprene disc 60mm in diameter, is placed on the inside. The helmet is fitted with a new version of the "cradle"- type liner, now consisting of three 25mm black synthetic fabric crossed straps attached to a light tan sweat-band and features a new 20mm olive green nylon adjustable strap system provided with a black quick-release plastic buckle backed by a light tan triangular leather piece to protect the wearer's face. A set of light tan leather reinforcing strips is sewn around the chin-straps, since unlike its predecessor, the harness of the Model 76-85 is not reinforced by an integral leather chin-cup.

==== OR-404 ====
An upgraded version of the OR-201 developed and manufactured by Hagor Industries Ltd of Kiryat Aryeh, Petah Tikva, east of Tel Aviv, it was introduced in the mid-1990s and marketed as the Hagor IDF Ballistic Military Helmet (IIIA). Unlike its Model 76 and Model 76-85 composite predecessors, the OR-404 shell is entirely constructed from Kevlar capable of withstanding both shrapnel and small-arms fire rounds and weights 1.10 kg. It is fitted with a black cushioned helmet liner of "cradle" type secured to the shell by seven rivets, and features an advanced black nylon adjustable strap system with black quick-release plastic buckle and a set of black leather reinforcing strips sewn around the joints and chin-straps in the harness. Production helmets usually came in a textured Khaki-Sand finish.

==== RBH 100-series ====
Besides Orlite and Hagor, another Israeli private firm that manufactures its own variants of the OR-201 is Rabintex Industries Ltd of Herzeliya near Tel Aviv, which is responsible for the "100-series" modernized helmets – the RBH 101, RBH 102, and RBH 103 models. They are almost identical to the original Model 76 and Model 76-85 helmets, differing only in some minor details such as the strap system, whose harnesses lack an integral leather chin-cup, and contained a secondary set of synthetic canvas web or nylon reinforcing strips sewn around the joints and the chin-straps. The materiel used in their construction also varies according to the model – the lightweight RBH 101 is made of ballistic nylon and weights 750g, the RBH 102 is made of reinforced fiberglass (GRP) and weights 1.46 kg, and the heavier RBH 103 made entirely of Kevlar that weights 1.50 kg. All these "100-series" models are resistant to impact and shock, and offer protection against shrapnel. Production helmets usually came in a textured Ochre finish, although RBH 103 helmets exported to Chile were painted in smooth Olive Drab.

== Combat use ==
=== Israel ===
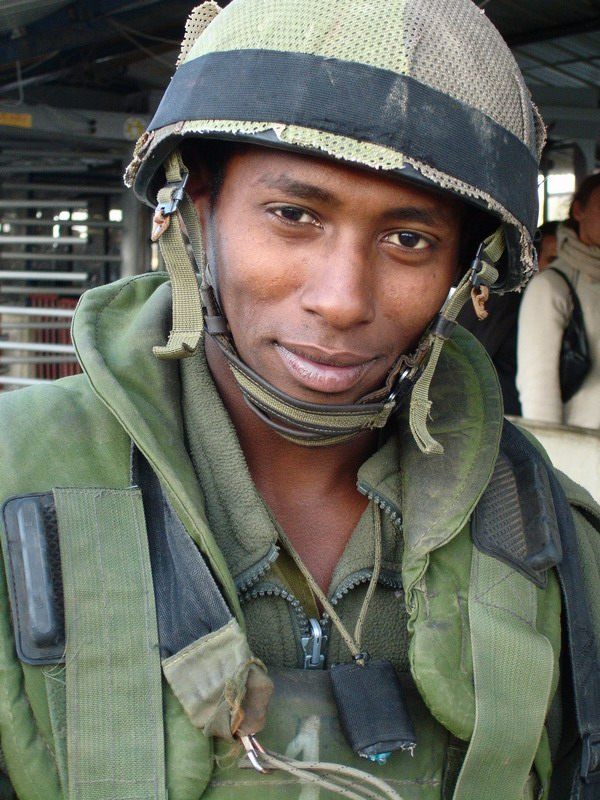
Israeli soldier wearing a OR-201 helmet near Nablus, April 2006.

The OR-201 combat helmet made its operational début during the famous Entebbe raid in July 1976 and was introduced the following year into Israeli forces, though its massive use by Israeli troops came only during the 1978 South Lebanon conflict and the subsequent June 1982 Israeli invasion of Lebanon.

=== Middle East ===
During the Lebanese Civil War, the pro-Israeli militias in Lebanon, the Christian Lebanese Forces (LF) and the South Lebanon Army (SLA) also began to receive the OR-201 Model 76 helmet in substantial quantities to equip their troops in the late 1970s, with captured examples eventually falling into the hands of militiamen from other Lebanese factions throughout the 1980s and 1990s. Photographic evidence taken at the time shows the Israeli combat helmet being used by fighters from the Christian Marada Brigade, the Shia Amal Movement and Hezbollah, the Druze People's Liberation Army (PLA), the Syrian Social Nationalist Party (SSNP), and even the Lebanese Army. The latter inherited a large stock of OR-201 helmets left behind by the LF and SLA militias after 1990 and 2000, being subsequently re-issued to the Lebanese Commando Regiment, the Counter-sabotage Regiment, the Lebanese Airborne Regiment and the Republican Guard Brigade.

=== Asia ===
The Sri Lanka Army adopted in the 1980s-1990s the OR-201 helmet for its infantry, commando and special forces units fighting the Liberation Tigers of Tamil Eelam (LTTE) insurgency during the Sri Lankan Civil War (1983–2009). India acquired limited quantities of the OR-201 helmet for the Indian special forces' units.

=== Africa ===
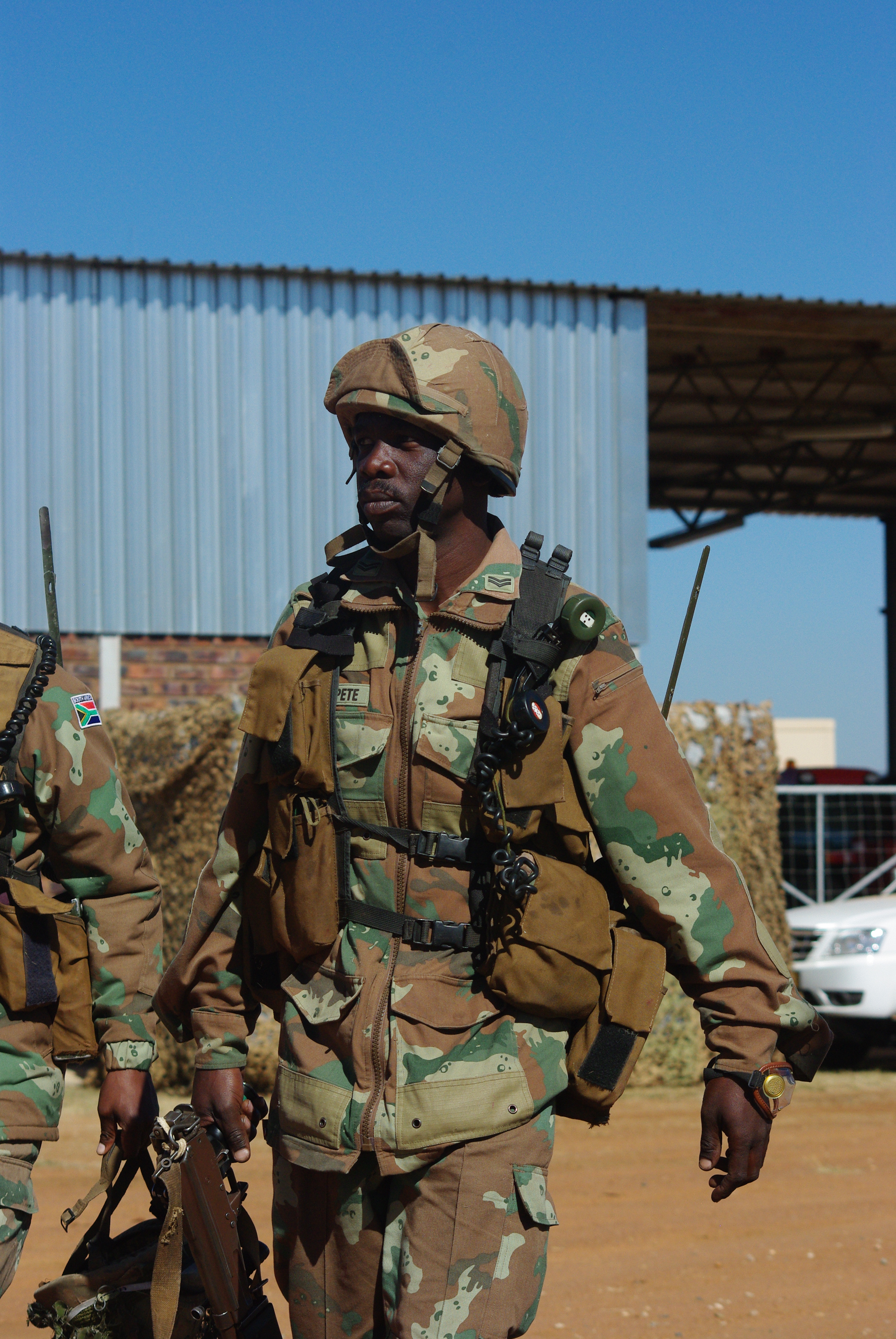
South African paratrooper wearing the SA M83 version of the OR-201 helmet at the Roodewal Weapons Range, 9 May 2013.

The South African Defence Force (SADF) adopted in 1983 the OR-201 Model 76 combat helmet as the SA M83, which was employed in combat by the Paratroopers and Recce Commandos during the South African Border War. Besides South Africa, limited quantities of the OR-201 helmet were also provided to the militaries of Egypt and Ghana.

=== Latin America ===
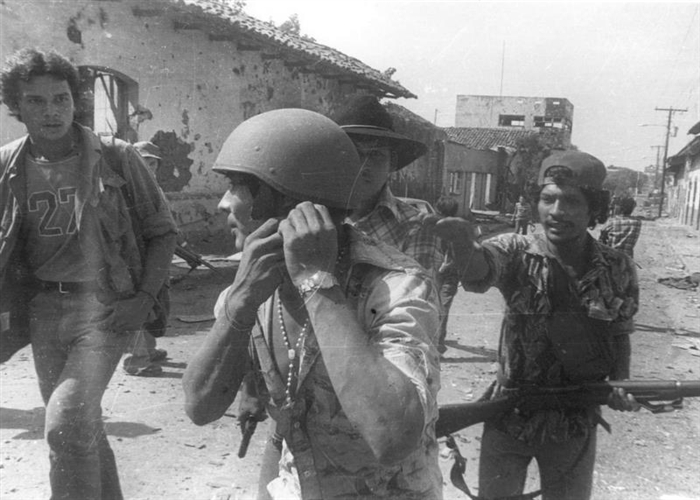
Sandinista rebel wearing a captured OR-201 helmet in León, Nicaragua, July 1979.

The OR-201 helmet began to be marketed to foreign recipients of Israeli military aid in the late 1970s and early 1980s, and the first Latin American country to receive it was Nicaragua in 1977-78. With the adoption of Israeli-made small-arms and equipment in 1976, the Somoza Regime ordered substantial quantities of the OR-201 Model 76 to equip the elite and infantry units of its Nicaraguan National Guard. Later during the 1978-79 Nicaraguan Revolution, captured OR-201 helmets were also worn by Sandinista National Liberation Front (FSLN) guerrillas.

Guatemala also received the OR-201 Model 76 for the Guatemalan Army's Parachute Brigade and Kaibiles, while Ecuador adopted it for its Naval Infantry Corps troops and Peru acquired Rabintex RBH-103 helmets to equip its Army and Naval Infantry units. Due to the arms embargoes imposed by the United States in the 1970s and 1980s to several Latin American countries because of the repressive nature of their military regimes, Israel stepped in and supplied since the mid-1970s the OR-201 Model 76 and Model 76-85 combat helmets to Mexico, El Salvador, Honduras, Colombia, Venezuela, Ecuador, Chile, Paraguay and Uruguay.

=== Europe ===
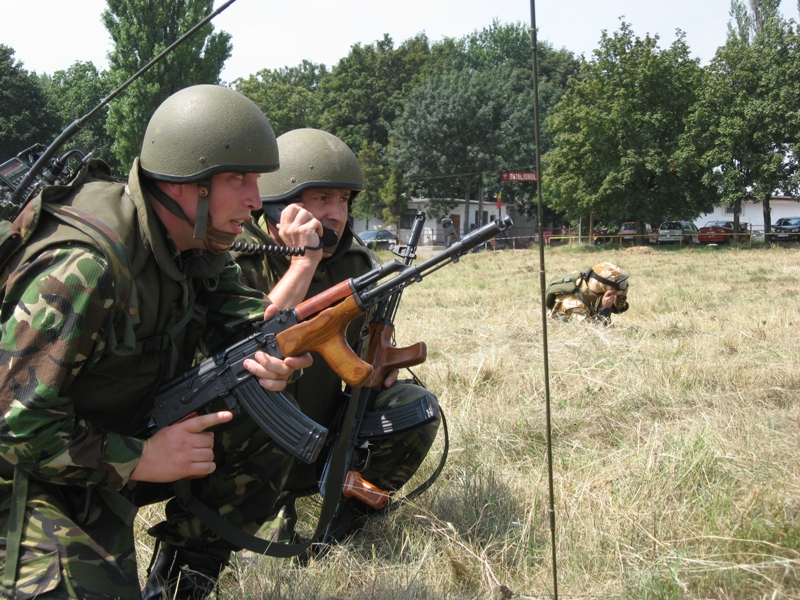
Romanian soldiers from the 151st Infantry Battalion wearing OR-201 helmets conduct training exercises.

The Irish Army adopted in the early 1980s the OR-201 Model 76-85 in ballistic nylon and issued it to infantry units in-country deployed on counter-insurgency operations along the border areas with Northern Ireland during The Troubles or those serving overseas with the Irish contingent of the United Nations Interim Force in Lebanon (UNIFIL) peace-keeping mission in southern Lebanon. They were sometimes used with either olive green or camouflage helmet covers. With the adoption of the Modern Irish Army camouflage uniform in the early 2000s, the Model 76-85 began to be phased out of service and in 2012 it was finally removed from issue, replaced by another Israeli model, the Rabintex RBH 303IE PASGT-shaped combat helmet in Kevlar plastic.

The Portuguese Marine Corps adopted the Rabintex RBH 103 model in the early 1990s, which remains in use.

The Romanian Land Forces also adopted the OR-201 combat helmet around the mid-1990s, replacing the older steel types dating back to the World War II and Cold War periods.

== Users ==
- Brazil
- Colombia
- Ecuador
- El Salvador: Orlite OR-201 Model 76 helmets used by the Salvadoran Army.
- Egypt
- Ghana: Used by the Ghana Army.
- Guatemala: Orlite OR-201 Model 76 and Model 76-85 helmets used by the Guatemalan Army (Parachute Brigade, Kaibiles).
- Honduras: Orlite OR-201 Model 76 and Model 76-85 helmets used by the Honduran Army (Paratroopers, Special Forces).
- India: Used by the Indian special forces.
- Israel: All variants used by the Israel Defense Forces and Israeli security forces.
- Lebanon: Orlite OR-201 Model 76 and Model 76-85 helmets were first used by the Lebanese Forces Christian militia (LF), and the South Lebanon Army (SLA), an ally of Israel. After the civil war, the helmets confiscated from the LF were transferred to Lebanese Armed Forces (Lebanese Commando Regiment, Counter-sabotage Regiment, Lebanese Airborne Regiment, Republican Guard Brigade).
- Mexico
- Palestine: Used by the Palestinian National Security Forces (PNSF).
- Peru: Rabintex RBH-103 helmets used by the Peruvian Armed Forces.
- Portugal: Rabintex RBH-103 helmets used by the Portuguese Marine Corps.
- Romania: Used by the Romanian Land Forces.
- South Africa: Used by Paratroopers and Recce Commandos as the M83 made by SAPHI and (initially) by Orlite.
- Sri Lanka
- Uruguay: Used by the Uruguayan Army Commandos.
- Venezuela

=== Non-state users ===
- Hamas (Izz ad-Din al-Qassam Brigades): Used captured helmets from the IDF and PNSF.
- Hezbollah: Used captured helmets from the SLA.
- Palestine (PLO armed factions in the Gaza Strip and the West Bank): Used captured helmets from the IDF and PNSF.

=== Civilian users ===
- Israel: Home Front Command
- Lebanese Red Cross

=== Former users ===
- Amal Movement: Used captured helmets from the Lebanese Forces, SLA, and IDF between 1983–1993.
- Ireland: Used by the Irish Defense Forces – Phased out in 2012 and replaced by the Rabintex RBH 303IE PASGT-shaped ballistic helmet.
- Chile: Rabintex RBH-103 helmets used by the Chilean Army, alongside Rabintex RBH-303 Golfo PASGT-shaped ballistic helmets.
- Marada Brigade: Used captured helmets from the Lebanese Forces between 1982–1990.
- Nicaragua: Orlite OR-201 Model 76 helmets used by the National Guard between 1977–79.
- Lebanese Forces: Orlite OR-201 Model 76 helmets provided by Israel used between 1982–1993.
- Paraguay: Used by the Paraguayan Army – Orlite Model 76-85 was replaced by the PASGT in the 90s.
- People's Liberation Army (Lebanon): Used captured helmets from the Lebanese Forces between 1983–1993.
- Sandinista National Liberation Front (FSLN): captured helmets from the Nicaraguan National Guard used by guerrillas between 1978–79.
- South Lebanon Army (SLA): Orlite OR-201 Model 76 and Model 76-85 helmets provided by Israel used between 1978–2000.
- Syrian Social Nationalist Party in Lebanon (Eagles of the Whirlwind): Used captured helmets from the Lebanese Forces, SLA, and IDF between 1983–1990.

== See also ==
- Doobon coat
- Ephod Combat Vest
- GOLFO
- MPC-1
- Bangtan Helmet: A similar helmet inspired by the OR-201
