= GOLFO =

Chilean Army combat helmet

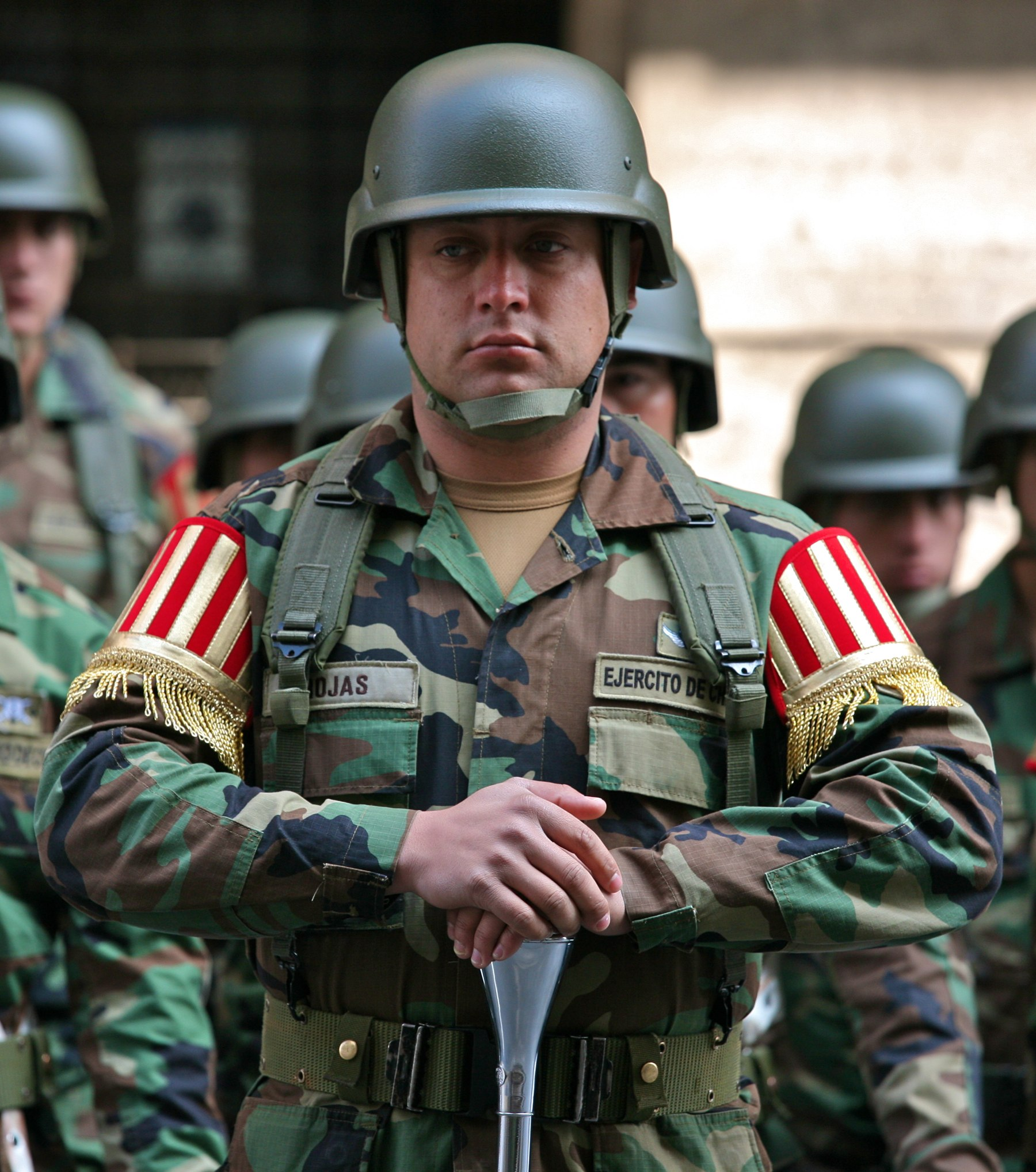
- Chilean Army Drum major wearing a GOLFO helmet
- Type: Combat Helmet
- Place of origin: Israel/Chile

Service history
- Used by: Chile

Production history
- Designer: Rabintex Industries Ltd.
- Designed: 1990s
- Manufacturer: Rabintex Industries Ltd. Baselli Hermanos Brothers S.A.
- Produced: 2000–present

The GOLFO is a combat helmet of Chilean origin issued to the Chilean Army. The helmet is produced locally by the Chilean private firm Baselli Hermanos Brothers S.A. and was introduced in 2000; Made of kevlar, it is capable of stopping a 9×19mm round at 310m.

== Development ==
In January 2006, the Chilean Army issued the Technical Specification CAK-5024 requesting a combat helmet with specific requirements (Protection Level:IIIA according to method NIJ Standard-0101.04.). The "RBH-303 Classic" PASGT-shaped ballistic helmet made by Rabintex Industries Ltd of Israel was selected and adopted in 2000 for Chilean Army usage as the "Rabintex 303 GOLFO." The Chilean-produced version retains the U.S. PASGT helmet shape but is fitted with a European-style head liner.

== Users ==
- Chile: Chilean Army

== See also ==
- OR-201
- PASGT
