= MPC-1 =

Combat helmet made in Yugoslavia

The MPC-1 is a combat helmet of Yugoslavian origin manufactured from the mid-1980s by the PAP Ljubljana company. The helmet is a derivative of the Israeli OR-201 but intended for paramilitary forces.

== Differences from the OR-201 ==
The main differences between the MPC-1 and the OR-201 is that it comes with a riot visor mount and neck cover for paramilitary forces and a different chinstrap, similar to the PČ99 helmet.

== Users ==
=== Former ===
- Slovenia
- Croatia - Used by Croatian forces during the Croatian War of Independence

== Bibliography ==
- Thomas, Nigel; Mikulan, Krunoslav (2006). The Yugoslav Wars (1): Slovenia & Croatia 1991–95. Bloomsbury Publishing. ISBN 978-1841769639.
