= 8th Mountain Cazadores Company =

Specialised unit of the Argentine Army

The 8th Mountain Huntsmen Company (Spanish: Compañía de Cazadores de Montaña 8) is a unit of the Argentine Army specialised in mountain warfare. The Company is based at based Puente del Inca, Mendoza Province. The name of the unit is "Teniente 1ro Ibañez". This unit is part of the 8th Mountain Infantry Brigade. The troops and soldiers of this unit wear a tan beret with unit insignia.

== See also ==
- Mountain warfare
- 8th Mountain Infantry Brigade
- Cazadores de Montaña
