= Eric Sherbrooke Walker =

- Portrait, c. 1910
- Born: 4 July 1887; Edgbaston, Birmingham, United Kingdom
- Died: 13 May 1976 (aged 88); Mallorca, Spain
- Other names: James Barbican
- Occupations: military officer, Boy Scout inspector, hotelier
- Known for: contribution to the Scout Movement, Treetops Hotel
- Spouse: Elizabeth Mary "Bettie" Feilding
- Children: Honor Sherbrooke Hurley

Major Eric George Sherbrooke Walker, MC (4 July 1887 – 13 May 1976) was a hotelier and founder of the Outspan Hotel and Treetops Hotel in Kenya, as well as a decorated military officer. He is remembered as the host of Queen Elizabeth II and Prince Philip when they visited Treetops in 1952, where they received news of the death of King George VI and Elizabeth's accession to the throne.

== Early life ==
The son of Reverend George Sherbrooke Walker and Jessie Elizabeth Carter, Eric Walker was born in Edgbaston, Birmingham, Warwickshire, on 4 July 1887 and brought up in March (now in Cambridgeshire) where his father was rector of St Wendreda's Church. He was educated at Oakham School and King Edward's, Edgbaston and then read Theology at The Queen's College, Oxford.

== Scout Movement ==
After graduating in 1908, Walker was associated with the Scout Movement and was a personal secretary to Robert Baden-Powell. He was one of the first two Boy Scout inspectors, overseeing Wales and the South of England. He was present at Baden-Powell's first Scout camp in Humshaugh in 1908 and conducted a demonstration tour of Canada with sixteen Boy Scouts in 1910.

== Military career ==
Walker was commissioned in the infantry in August 1914. He transferred to the Royal Flying Corps. On Thu 25 February 1915, Baden-Powell's wife wrote in her diary

"A day of great excitement for Ewhurst; 8.45 Eric Walker literally flew over on his way to France & landed by the church for breakfast with us. Glorious to see him sail humming away into the mist – to what?"

On 4 July 1915, his 28th birthday, his aeroplane came down behind enemy lines and he was held as a prisoner of war in Germany. He is said to have made 36 attempts to escape. Apparently, on one occasion, a German girlfriend from before the war helped him by supplying him with wire cutters provided by Baden-Powell hidden inside a piece of ham. He kept a diary of that period, published in 2014 as "Avoiding Archie: The Flying Corps Diary of Captain Walker".

After the First World War ended, he was employed as a temporary captain on the General List, fighting against the Bolsheviks with the British Military Mission in South Russia alongside the White Army in the Russian Civil War. He was awarded the Military Cross for his gallantry at Ushun in the Crimea on 8 and 10 March 1920, where he attached himself to the Police Regiment and remained with them throughout the two days of counter-attacks, during which they sustained heavy casualties. By his personal example and coolness, under heavy machine-gun fire, he was largely responsible for the decisive success gained. In addition, he received the Order of St. Anna and the Order of St. Stanislaus from the White Russian authorities.

== Marriage ==
Walker returned to England after the war and became engaged then married to Lady Elizabeth Mary "Bettie" Feilding, the daughter of Rudolph Feilding, 9th Earl of Denbigh, on 26 July 1926.

== Bootlegging ==
Needing money to finance his marriage, he ran a bootlegging business, smuggling liquor into America during the Prohibition era, while his fiancée Lady Bettie worked as social secretary in the British Embassy in Washington, D.C. When Walker shot and wounded a corrupt state trooper who had tried to steal his cache of whiskey, the couple fled to Canada. Walker later wrote The Confessions of a Rum-Runner under the pseudonym of "James Barbican"' about his life during this period.

== Life in Kenya ==
The couple emigrated to the Kenya Colony, where Walker purchased approximately 70 acres (28 ha) of Crown Land in Nyeri and - in 1928 - opened the Outspan Hotel, overlooking the gorge of the Chania River in the Aberdare Range (near the present day Aberdare National Park).

In 1932, he opened the adjunct Treetops Hotel as a night-viewing station for wildlife. These business ventures may have been based on profits made during his bootlegging days in America.

In 1938, Baden-Powell retired to the Outspan Hotel (Baden-Powell once remarked "closer to Nyeri, closer to bliss"). He bought a share of Walker's hotel business to pay for his one-room cottage Paxtu (now home to a Scout museum) in the hotel grounds. Baden-Powell died on 8 January 1941 and is buried at St Peter's Cemetery in Nyeri. His grave there is a Kenyan National Monument.

Walker was 52 when World War II broke out but he saw further military service, first enlisting in the Royal Air Force and then going on to serve with the South African forces in Abyssinia and in the Western Desert during the North African campaign, narrowly avoiding capture at Sidi Rezegh.

He was host to Princess Elizabeth and her husband, the Duke of Edinburgh, during their February 1952 visit to Kenya. The couple had accepted an invitation to spend a night at Treetops and arrived there on the afternoon of 5 February 1952. During the night, unknowingly, the Princess succeeded to the British throne. Her father, King George VI, died at Sandringham in England in the early hours of 6 February and the Princess received the news later that day, after leaving Treetops, at the Sagana Lodge.

Walker was again employed on military duties during the Mau Mau Uprising in the early 1950s. Treetops was offered as a lookout point for the King's African Rifles but it was burned down by Mau Mau fighters on 27 May 1954. Walker built a bigger hotel at the same location in 1957, and business prospered - encouraged by public interest in the accession of Elizabeth II some years earlier. His hotel business was featured in National Geographic magazine and celebrities, including Charles Chaplin and Paul McCartney, visited the hotel. Walker wrote a book about his life in Kenya, named Treetops Hotel.

The hunter Jim Corbett moved to Kenya after the Independence of India, took up residence at the Outspan and became a resident hunter at Treetops. A house on the Walkers' farm was used during the shooting of the film Born Free.

An avid hunter during his younger days, Walker became an advocate of wildlife conservation in his final years in Kenya.

He retired to live in Mallorca, Spain and died there at his home, Cás Fidavé, on 13 May 1976.
