= Muthui =

Muthui is a Kenyan name that may refer to the following people:

- Muthui Kariuki (born 1956), Kenyan journalist
