= Nyeri =

Town in Nyeri County, Kenya

- Town
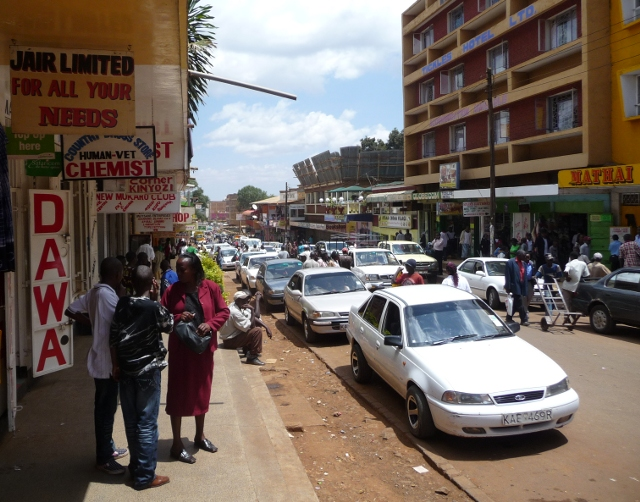
- A street in the centre of Nyeri

- Location within Kenya
- Coordinates: 0°25′S 36°57′E
- Country: Kenya
- County: Nyeri County
- Elevation: 1,750–1,812 m (5,741–5,945 ft)

Population (2019)
  - Total: 140,338
- Time zone: UTC+3 (EAT)
- Climate: Cfb

Nyeri is a town situated in the Central Highlands of Kenya, at an average elevation of about 1,750 to 1,812 metres (5,750 to 5,945 feet) above sea level. It is the headquarters of Nyeri County and was the central administrative headquarters of the country's former Central Province. The town is situated about 150 km north of Nairobi, in the country's densely populated and fertile Central Highlands. The town lies between the eastern base of the Nyandarua (Aberdare) Range, which forms part of the eastern side of the Great Rift Valley, and the western slopes of Mount Kenya.

The town's population, according to the 2019 Kenya Population and Housing Census, was estimated at 140,338 inhabitants. However, the number is rapidly growing. There is, a significant population of primarily Government and corporate workers who ordinarily reside in Nyeri but who, during the census, choose to be counted in their areas of origin or the areas where their families are residents. The town has a relatively low cost of living compared to Nairobi and other major urban centres in Kenya. Located in Kenya's fertile highlands, food and water are plentiful and relatively affordable.

The tomb of Robert Baden-Powell, the founder of the Scout movement is in the local cemetery. It is the home town of the late Nobel laureate Wangarĩ Maathai. It is also the home of Dedan Kimathi University of Technology (DeKUT), founded by the local community in the early 1970s as an institute of technology, and converted into a fully fledged university in 2012.

== History ==
Towards the end of 1902, as the British were establishing their colonial presence, Richard Meinertzhagen marched a strong military column meeting spirited resistance from the native Kikuyu warriors led by Wangombe Wa Ihura. The Kikuyu were eventually defeated. After Meinertzhagen's victory, a decision was reached to site a British post close to a little hill on the slopes of Mt. Kenya. The Kikuyu called the hill Kia-Nyiri while their Maasai neighbours called the hill Na-aier. The post took its name from the little hill. On 18 December 1902, Nyeri was founded.

Shortly after the establishment of the post, a trickle of European settlers and missionaries and Indian merchants began to migrate into Nyeri and the surrounding areas. The town soon burgeoned into a trading centre for white settler farmers who produced cattle, wheat and coffee. The town became particularly associated with the Happy Valley set in the first half of the twentieth century. The Nyeri Golf Club, The White Rhino Hotel, Outspan Hotel, and the Aberdare Country Club at the nearby Mweiga township are relics of those colonial days.

== Demographics and culture ==
=== Ethnicity and language ===
The majority of Nyeri residents are members of Kenya's largest ethnic group, the Kikuyu, with residents generally being known as "Nyeri Kikuyu". The Kikuyu language is widely spoken, along with Kenya's National language Swahili as well as Kenya's official language English.

=== Religion ===
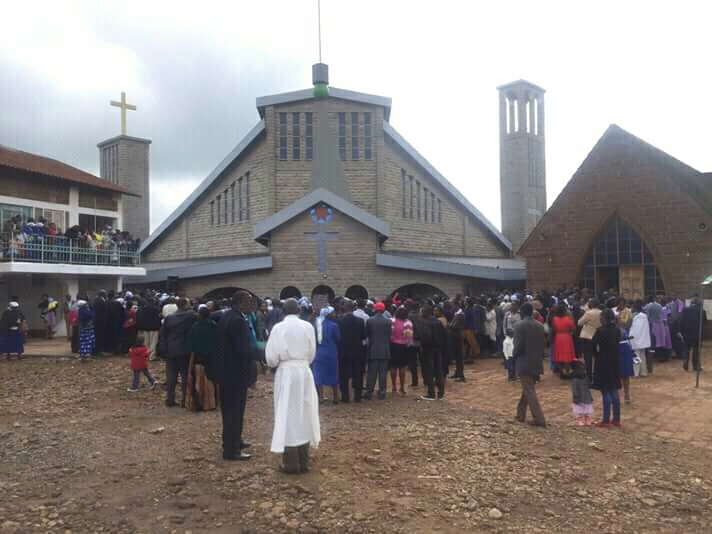
St. Peter's Cathedral, an Anglican church in Nyeri

Following the national pattern of Kenya being a predominantly Christian country, Christianity is the main religion. The main Christian denominations are Catholic-that hosts the Cathedral and the Archbishop's official residence-, Presbyterian, Anglican, Pentecostals and indigenous denominations, in that order. The older residents, who tend to attend the mainstream churches, are invariably more religious than the younger ones. Muslims, traditional African believers and Hindus, in declining order, make up a small minority.

About 5 km from the town centre is the Mathari Mission settlement, a complex of several Catholic buildings and institutions, established by Italian missionaries at the beginning of the 20th century. The mission is composed of convents for nuns, schools, a teacher training college and other vocational colleges. It also hosts the Consolata Hospital and School of Nursing, which is staffed largely by nuns of the Consolata order. Nyeri is also the place where Blessed Stephanie Nyaatha was laid to rest.

=== Education ===
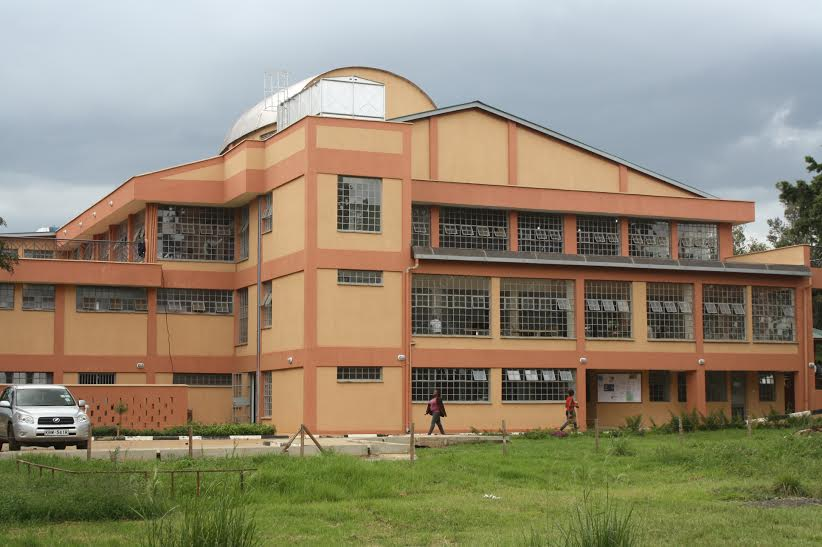
Dedan Kimathi University of Technology

In addition to its two home-grown universities, Dedan Kimathi University of Technology and Karatina University College, Nyeri hosts satellite campuses of various Kenyan public universities such as University of Nairobi and Kenyatta University.

The National Police Training College is situated in Kiganjo, 10.8 km from the town. There is a Medical Training College, a government nursing school, two polytechnic colleges, and several private and public secondary and primary schools such as Moi Nyeri Complex, Temple Road, DEB Muslim and Ngangarithi primary school. The town is also home to the Nyeri National Polytechnic.. Other technical training colleges in the town include Tetu TVC, Mathira TVC and Kieni Esat TVC as well as many vocational and technical training centres spread across the county. The Roman Catholic Church Archdiocese of Nyeri runs several schools, colleges, and hospitals. The town is also home to three national schools, Kagumo High School, Nyeri High School and the Bishop Gatimu Girls High School in Nyeri. It is the home to prestigious extra county schools in the nation like Othaya Boys High School and Mahiga Girls Secondary School. St. Mary's Boys Secondary School Nyeri is another top-performing high school located in Nyeri's town.

== Economy ==
The largest formal employer in Nyeri, being until recently the administrative headquarters of the former Central Province, is the Government of Kenya. The local Municipal Council and utility providers are also significant employers. The various sectors of the service industry, including retail, hospitality, banking, insurance, the charity industry, religious bodies especially the Catholic Church and professionals are also significant employers.

The main industrial plants are a Coca-Cola bottling plant, a water and fruit juice bottling plant, several tea and coffee processing factories, a milk processing and packaging factory owned and run by the Kenya Co-operative Creameries Ltd, and a number of maize millers. There is also a wide range of largely unsophisticated light industries, including motor vehicle repair garages, electronics repair shops, furniture workshops, tailoring shops, and bakeries. Attractive investment opportunities exist within the Nyeri industrial area of Kiganjo which is served by the newly refurbished railway line and has ample land for industrial expansion.

A major industry in Nyeri is farming, which is mostly unmechanised. The town urban area is actually part of the surrounding rural areas of greater Nyeri County, with farms within the municipality blending seamlessly into the rural area. The main cash crops are coffee and tea, grown mainly by smallholders who are organised into quasi-private state-supported and supervised co-operatives or companies for farm input distribution, basic processing and marketing purposes.

The main food crops are maize, the staple food in most of Kenya, legumes (especially beans and peas), tubers (mainly potatoes), and vegetables (especially tomatoes, cabbages, spinaches and kales). Livestock, mainly dairy cattle, goats, sheep, and chicken are also widely kept. Food crop and livestock farming are also done by smallholders, with marketing and distribution of surplus produce (after farmers' consumption) being done privately.

Tourism is also significant, as there are many tourist destinations nearby, including the Aberdare and Mount Kenya National Parks, and a number of hotels offering conference tourism and short upcountry holidays. The Nyeri Museum is located within Nyeri town, it houses cultural artifacts and Kenya's colonial history.

=== Infrastructure ===
Nyeri has tarmacked roads, and the county and national governments are upgrading many of them. Houses have drinkable water, but sewage is septic tanks, through soak pits, pit latrines are still widespread. The town's topography allows nature and gravity to take care of most of the town's storm water drainage.

Phone services, especially mobile and internet services are widely available. A fibre optic cable network linked the town to offshore submarine cables in 2010

=== Transport ===
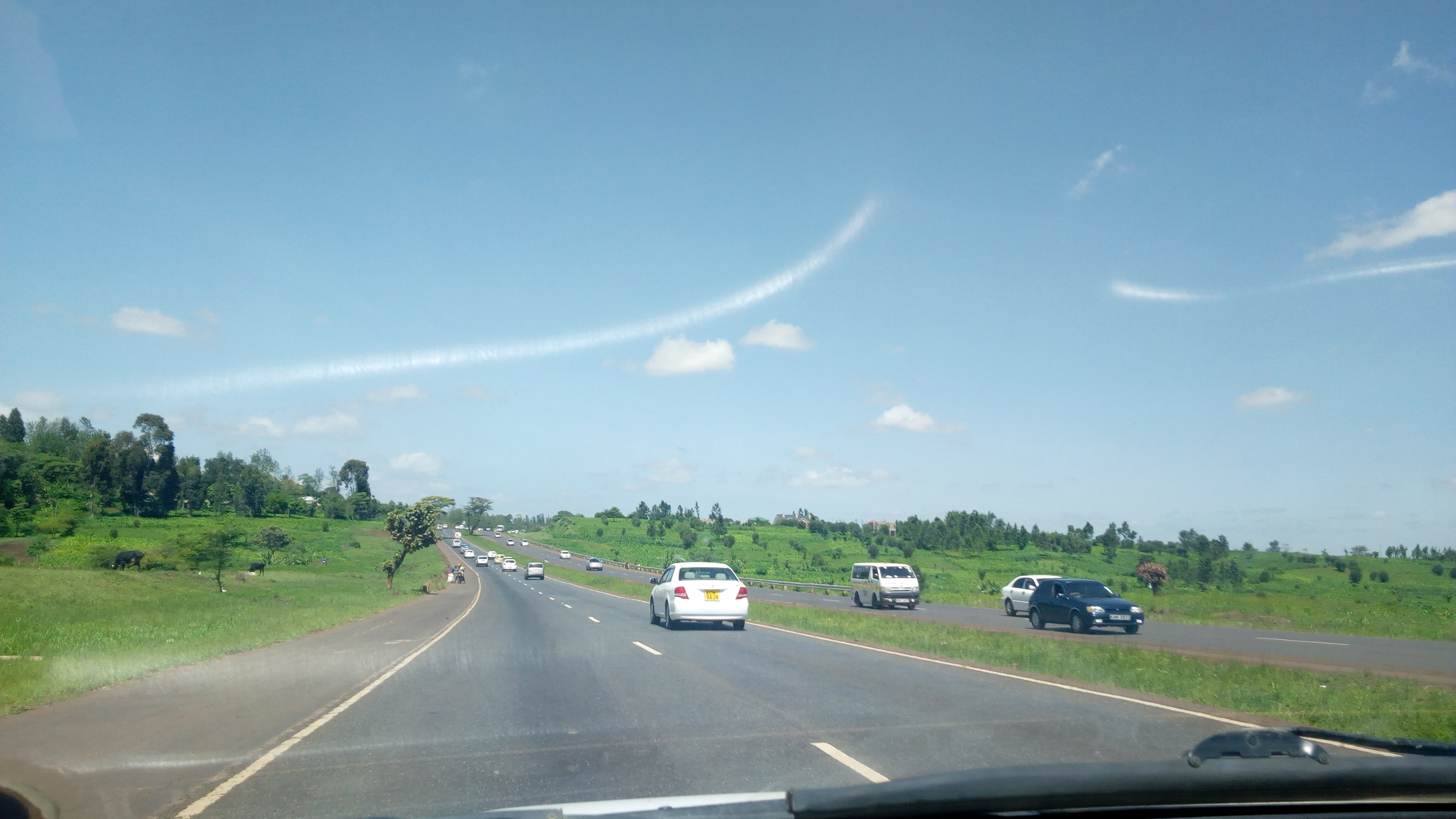
Nairobi-Nyeri highway

Nyeri is served by a well-maintained tarmac road network connecting it to Nairobi, Nakuru, Nanyuki, Othaya and other surrounding towns. The Kenol-Marua 4 lane super highway ends a few kilometers from Nyeri town, Most transportation of cargo to and from Nyeri is by road, although the town has a largely underutilised railway station at Kiganjo (about six kilometres out of town towards Nanyuki) on the branchline of the railway from Nairobi to Nanyuki.

An airport, Nyeri Airport, and some airstrips serve the town: one at Mweiga (about 15 kilometres (9.3 mi) out of town towards Nakuru) and another at Nyaribo, off the Nanyuki – Naromoru highway. The main mode of public passenger transport to, from, and within Nyeri is by way of fourteen-seater minibuses (matatu), though un-metered salon car taxis are also widely used.

=== Notable graves ===
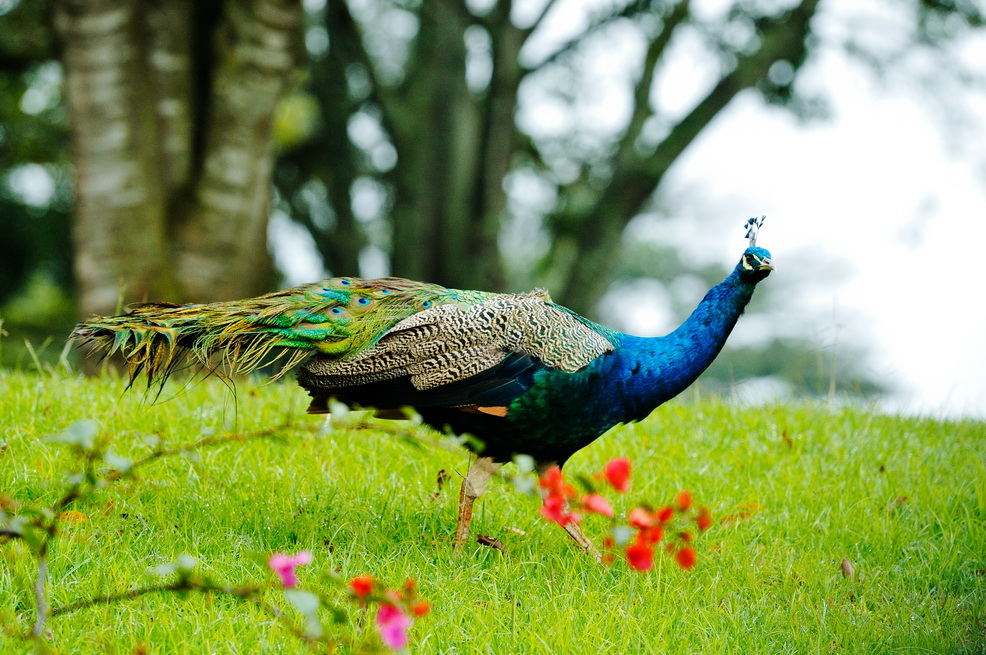
Peacock at Outspan Hotel, Nyeri

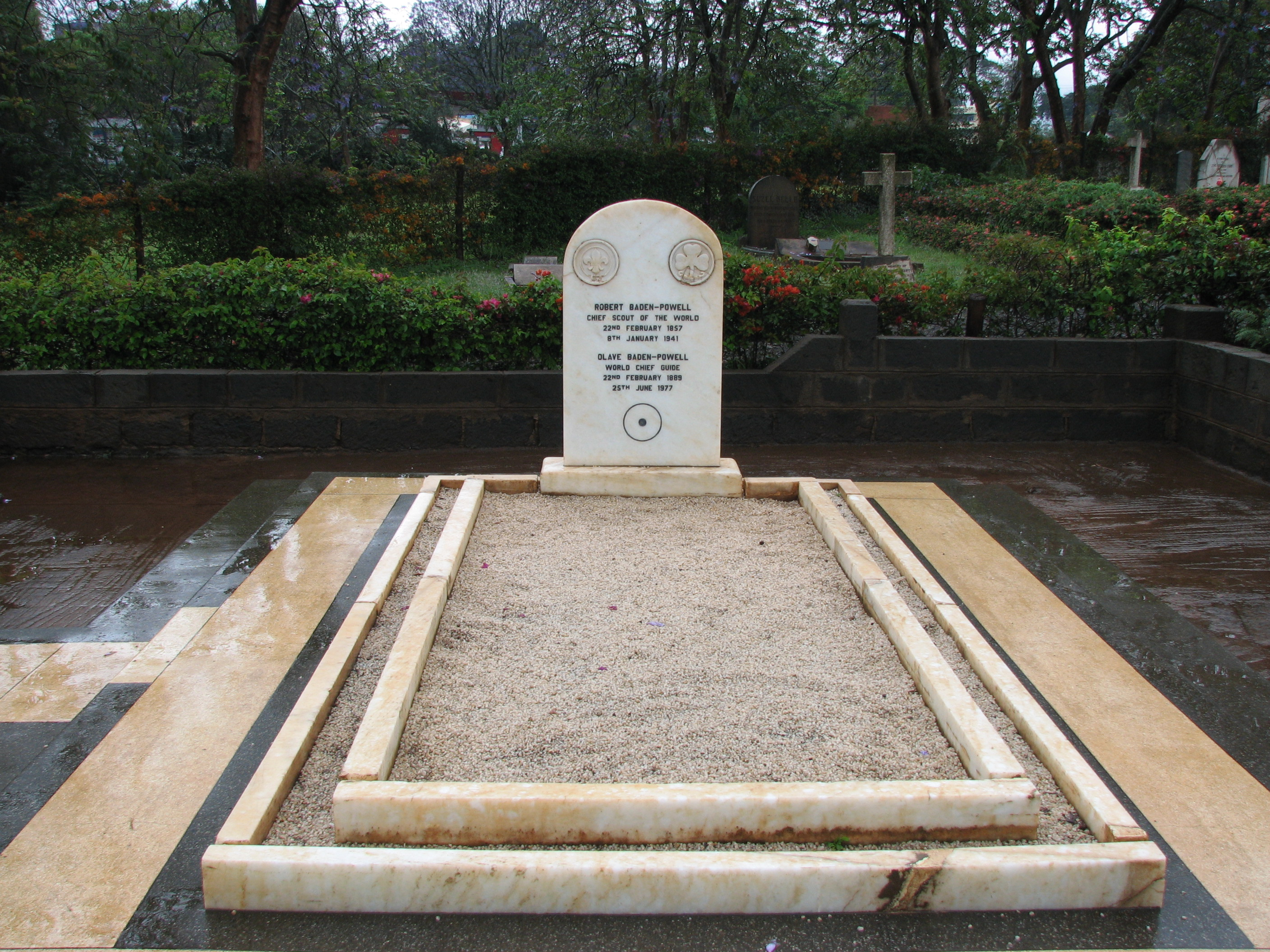
Lt.-Gen. Lord Baden-Powell's Grave

Nyeri has many visitors to the Baden-Powell grave, the resting place of Lieutenant-General Lord Baden-Powell, a British commander in the Boer War and the founder of the Scouting Movement, who once wrote "the nearer to Nyeri the nearer to bliss". He and his wife Olave, Lady Baden-Powell, G.B.E., are buried in the town cemetery. Baden-Powell had a cottage built, which he called "Paxtu". He lived there until his death, and it is now a small museum; it stands in the grounds of the Outspan Hotel. Nyeri remains a place of pilgrimage for the worldwide Scouting and Guiding Movements, with members congregating in the town from time to time for various activities and functions.

There are also visitors to the Italian War Memorial Chapel at Mathari, built in 1952 by the Italian government in honour of Royal Italian Army soldiers, prisoners of war, and other internees, from the time of the Second World War who died in East Africa, including 69 African recruits to the Italian forces, mostly Somalis. Among those buried at Mathari is Prince Amedeo, Duke of Aosta, Viceroy of Italian East Africa, whose tomb is within the Chapel, in front of the altar.

The chapel is not used for regular worship, but a special Mass is celebrated every 2 November in memory of the fallen soldiers and those who died in captivity. Covering the walls of the main church building are memorials for the many Italian servicemen who died during the war. Each memorial is in the form of a small oblong plaque indicating the name of the soldier, the battalion he served in, and the place where he died.

Nyeri is also the burial place of hunter and conservationist Jim Corbett, the author of Man-Eaters of Kumaon (1944), who also spent his final years in Paxtu, B-P's cottage.

==== Mount Kenya ====
Mount Kenya and Nyeri hill are near each other, as well as the Tetu hills 50 km to the North East. About 20 km from the town is Mount Kenya National Park. Mount Kenya is an extinct volcano lying astride the Equator. The mountain has two main snow-covered peaks – Batian (5200 m) and Nelion (5188 m). It is the highest mountain in the country and the second highest, after Mount Kilimanjaro, in Africa.

The mountain slopes are covered in forest, bamboo, scrub and moorland giving way to high central peaks of rock, ice and snow. Its U-shaped glacial valleys, rugged snow-capped peaks, Afro-alpine desert, thirty lakes and eight different natural forest types and a variety of wildlife species make it a convergence of natural attractions. The wildlife found in the park include giant forest hog, tree hyrax, white-tailed mongoose, black leopard, mountain bongo, elephant, black rhino, suni, black-fronted duiker, mole-rat and over 130 species of birds. Activities taking place in the park include game drives, nature walks, mountain climbing, wildlife viewing, camping and cave exploration.

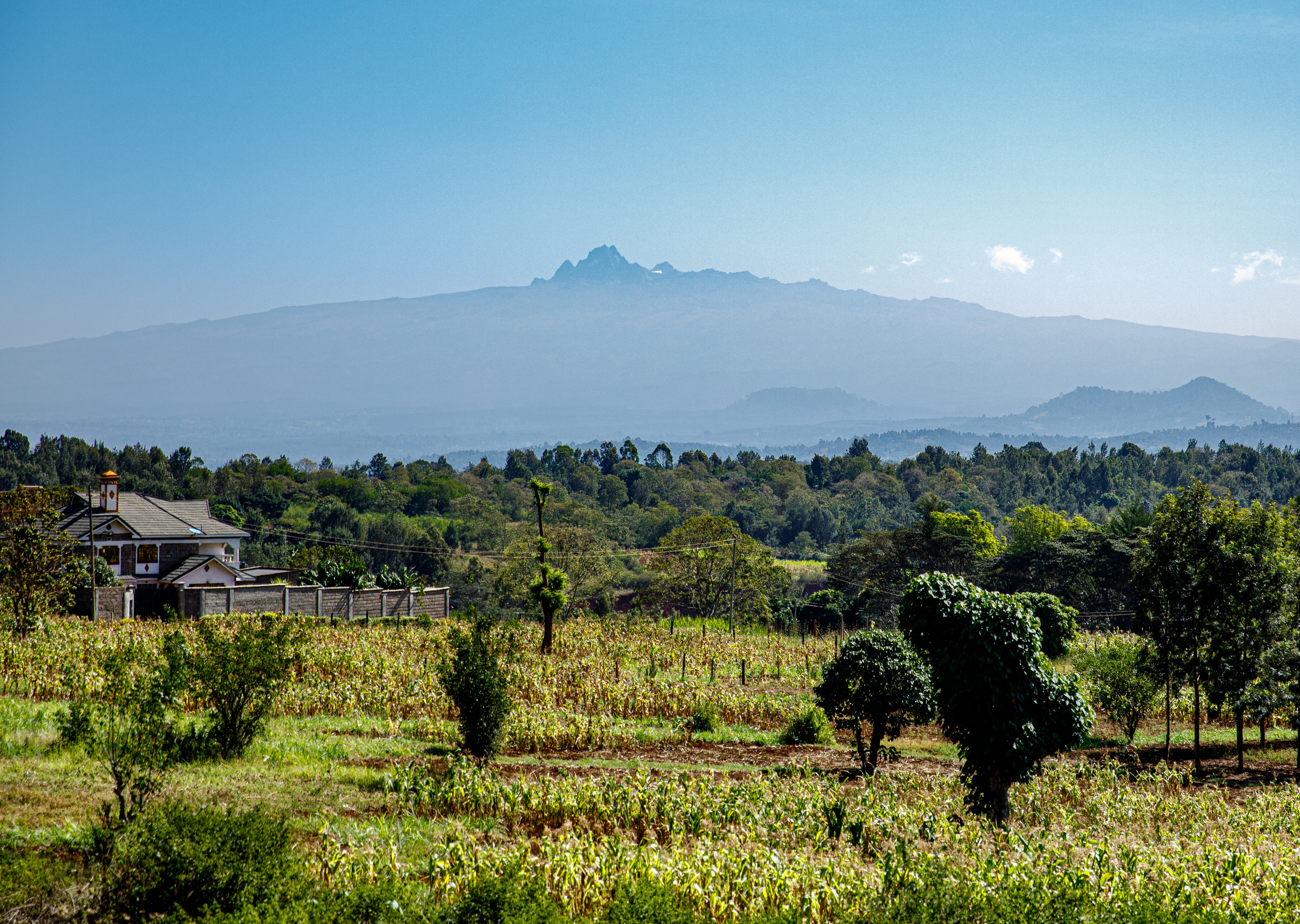
View of Mount Kenya from Nyeri

==== The Aberdares ====
About 15 kilometres west of Nyeri (on the opposite side to Mt. Kenya) is the Aberdare National Park. The Aberdares is an old volcanic mountain range with lower peaks due to a longer period of erosion. It offers views of Mount Kenya to the east and the Great Rift Valley to the west. Its unusual vegetation, rugged terrain, deep ravines cutting through its forested eastern and western slopes, clear water streams and waterfalls combine to create an area of great scenic beauty. Its major attractions include the Lesatima and Kinangop peaks and many waterfalls, including the magnificent Karuru falls which drop 272 metres, Zaina falls which drop about 140 metres and the Gura Falls which drop 305 metres.

The park is home to many endangered species including the rare bongo, giant forest hog, packs very rare wild dogs, and endemic mole-rat and mole shrew. Other game include a large population of black rhino, leopard servile, endemic bird species, reptiles and insects. Activities include game drives and nature walks. Both brown and rainbow trout abound in the cool mountain streams. Within the park, lodges near watering holes offer close proximity night game viewing. It was while spending a night at Treetops Lodge during her state visit to Kenya that Princess Elizabeth, Duchess of Edinburgh (now Elizabeth II) became Queen on the death of her father. She was advised of this and of her ascent to the throne on her return to the Sagana Royal Lodge the following day. The park is also known for the Kimathi hideouts, the Mau-Mau Caves, and the Kimathi "post office" where agents used to drop messages for Mau Mau fighters during the guerrilla wars for Kenyan independence.

==== Private ranches ====
Close to the town are several privately owned ranches, many of which also serve as private wildlife sanctuaries like Solio Ranch, Ol Pejeta Conservancy, and Lewa Wildlife Conservancy. Many higher-end tourists stay at these ranches, including celebrities such as Bill Gates.

== Administration and government ==
Nyeri is now, as an administrative centre, currently in transition as the new governance and administrative structures created by the new Kenyan Constitution are in the early stages of implementation.

=== Central government ===
Provincial Administration

Nyeri, as aforesaid, had been the Provincial Headquarters of the now defunct Central Province. The fate of the Provincial Administration is now the subject of intense national debate as the country transits to the new Constitution's new governance structure. In the interim, the Central Provincial Commissioner (PC) remains in Nyeri. Under him remain the District Commissioner, Nyeri Central District (DC), the Divisional Officers (DO), the Locational Chiefs and the Assistant Chiefs.

Government Departments

Various Central Provincial and Nyeri Central District departments of the various ministries of the Government of Kenya, and central provincial offices of several Kenya Government departments and State Corporations are also still based in Nyeri.

Security

The Central Provincial Police Officer (PPO) of the Kenya Police Service, and under him, as one of the police divisional heads, the Nyeri Divisional Police Commander (OCPD)are based in Nyeri.

=== Local government ===
Nyeri is currently awaiting to be awarded the city status with a certified charter. The county assembly is composed of elected MCAs and a county governor. The county legislative system is also led by a county speaker. The Council is based at the Nyeri town Hall. Since the new constitution was promulgated, the administration is handled by the County Government.

=== Parliamentary representation ===
Nyeri Municipality is a parliamentary constituency known as Nyeri Town Constituency represented in the National Assembly by an elected member of parliament. Hon. Duncan Maina Mathenge is the current member of parliament.

== People ==
People from Nyeri County include:

- Mwai Kibaki, third President of Kenya from 2002 to 2013
- Geoffrey Rigathi Gachagua, Former Deputy President of Kenya
- Stanley Mathenge, Mau Mau General
- Nicodemus Kirima, Archbishop of Nyeri Archdiocese
- Wangari Maathai, Nobel Peace Prize winner
- Dedan Kimathi, Mau Mau resistance leader
- Waruhiu Itote, Mau Mau war general
- Muthui Kariuki, Former government spokesman
- Catherine Ndereba, Olympic marathon Silver Medalist
- Irene Wangeci Ndungu, Bronze medallist in 1963 Commonwealth games (110 meter hurdles)
- Charles Mangua
