= Outspan Hotel =

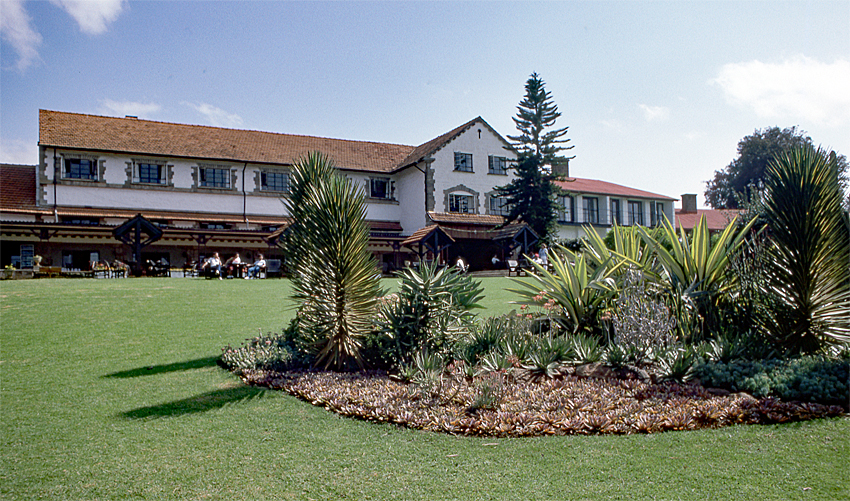
- Outspan Hotel, 1987

General information
- Town or city: Nyeri
- Country: Kenya
- Coordinates: 0.4209°S 36.9418°E
- Opened: 1928

Other information
- Number of rooms: 45

Website
- outspan.co.ke

The Outspan Hotel, located in Nyeri, Kenya, was developed from an old farm by Eric Sherbrooke Walker during the 1920s.

In 1928, Walker opened the Outspan Hotel on 28 hectares (69 acres) of Crown Land in Nyeri, overlooking the gorge of a river in the Aberdare Range.

The hotel now features 45 rooms on 8.1 ha (20 acres) of landscaped gardens.

== Background ==
In 1939, Baden-Powell and his wife Olave moved into a cottage he had commissioned on the hotel grounds. The Paxtu cottage is now part of the hotel complex and serves as a small Scouting museum dedicated to scouting.

The hunter Jim Corbett also lived there.

== See also ==
- Treetops Hotel
