= Treetops Hotel =

Building in Kenya

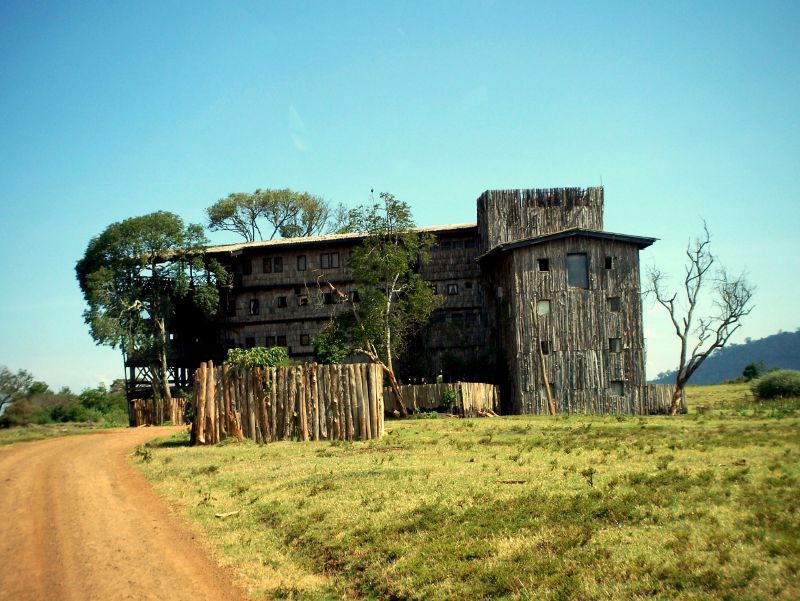
- Treetops Hotel (2006)
- Interactive map of the Treetops Hotel area
- Hotel chain: Aberdare Safari Hotels

General information
- Location: Aberdare National Park, Kenya
- Coordinates: 0°21′36″S 36°54′02″E
- Opened: 1932

Other information
- Number of rooms: 32
- Number of suites: 3
- Number of restaurants: 1
- Number of bars: 1

Treetops Hotel is a hotel in Aberdare National Park in Kenya ten miles (16 km) from the township of Nyeri, 1,966 metres (6,450 ft) above sea level on the Aberdare Range and in sight of Mount Kenya. First opened in November 1932 by Eric Sherbrooke Walker, it was built into the tops of the trees of Aberdare National Park as a treehouse, offering the guests a close view of the local wildlife. The idea was to provide a machan (hunting platform on a tree during shikar in India) experience in relative safety and comfort. From the original modest two-room tree house built into the top of a tree, it grew into a 35-room hotel. The original structure was replaced by a larger structure, also in the tree, but additionally supported on legs; this was burnt down by the Kenya Land and Freedom Army (KLFA) in 1954 during the Mau Mau Uprising. The hotel was rebuilt near the same waterhole and became fashionable for wealthy clientele. It includes observation lounges and ground-level photographic hides from which guests can observe the local wildlife at the nearby waterholes.

Treetops is where Elizabeth II (then Princess Elizabeth) was staying in 1952 when she acceded to the thrones of the United Kingdom and the other Commonwealth realms, upon the death in England of her father, King George VI.

== Beginnings ==
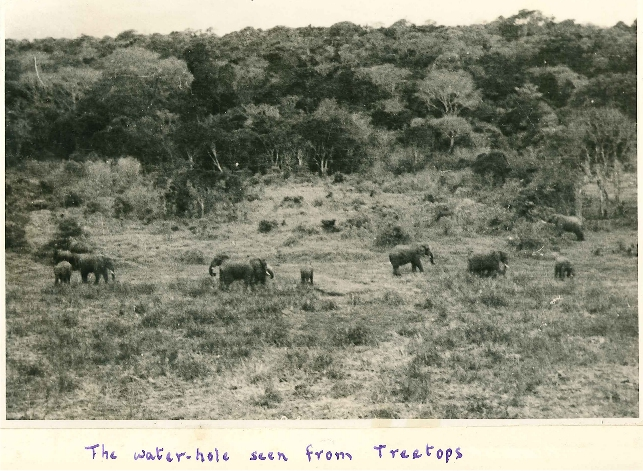
The view of the waterholes from Treetops, 1935

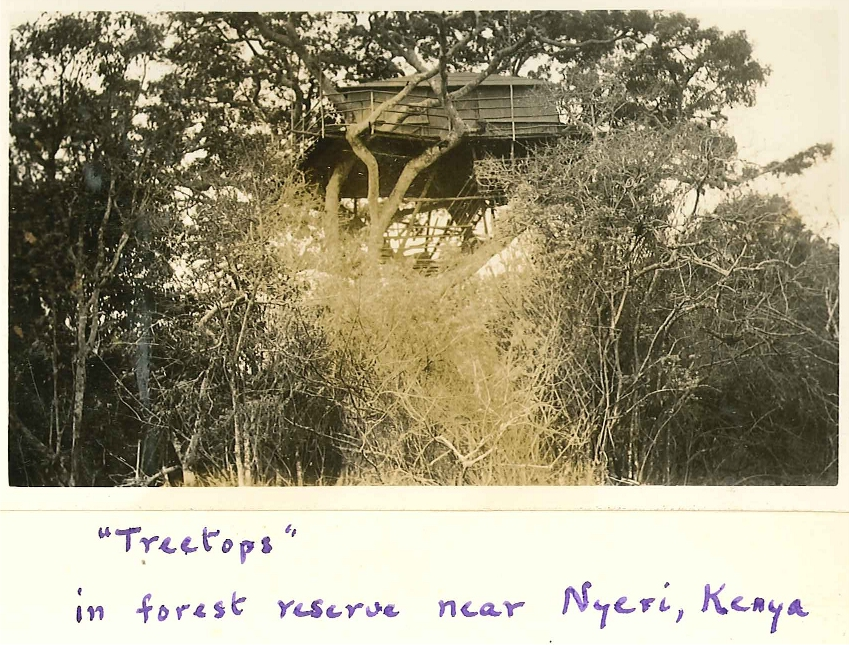
The first structure, photographed in 1935

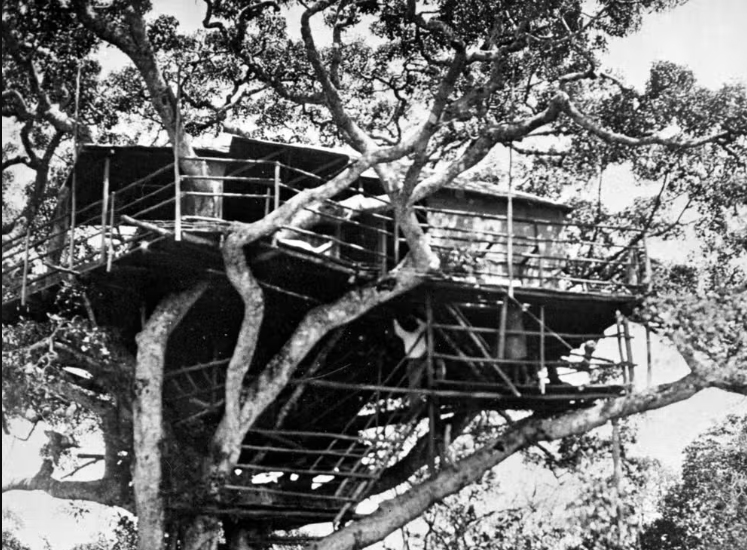
Treetops in 1935

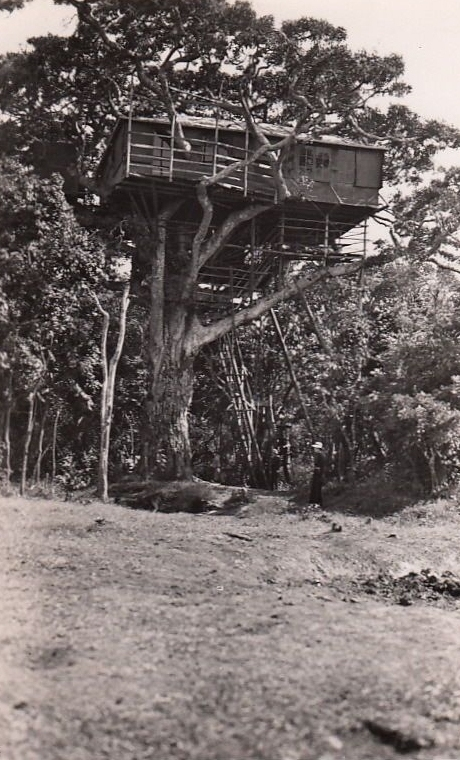
Treetops in 1935, in context

The original idea of Major Eric Sherbrooke Walker, who owned land in the Aberdare Range, was to build a treehouse for his wife Lady Bettie. The idea grew, and in 1932 the couple oversaw the construction of a two-room treehouse in a huge 300-year-old fig tree well away from Nyeri itself; this was intended as an adjunct facility to the Outspan Hotel in Nyeri, which they had also built and owned. Initial construction was hampered by the presence of wild animals, as the treehouse was purposely built beside animal trails leading to a nearby waterhole. Labourers and supervisors were often chased away by wild animals, which led to increased labour costs.

This first structure was open only on Wednesday nights as a night-viewing platform for guests staying at the Outspan Hotel; although beds were provided, these were intended for resting or dozing, rather than sleeping. Rising demand prompted the Walkers to expand to accommodate more visitors. The visit of Princess Elizabeth and her husband Prince Philip, Duke of Edinburgh in 1952 included a visit to Treetops as personal guests of the Walkers. The Treetops was reinforced, and its capacity increased to four rooms, including one for a resident hunter.

== Royal visit ==
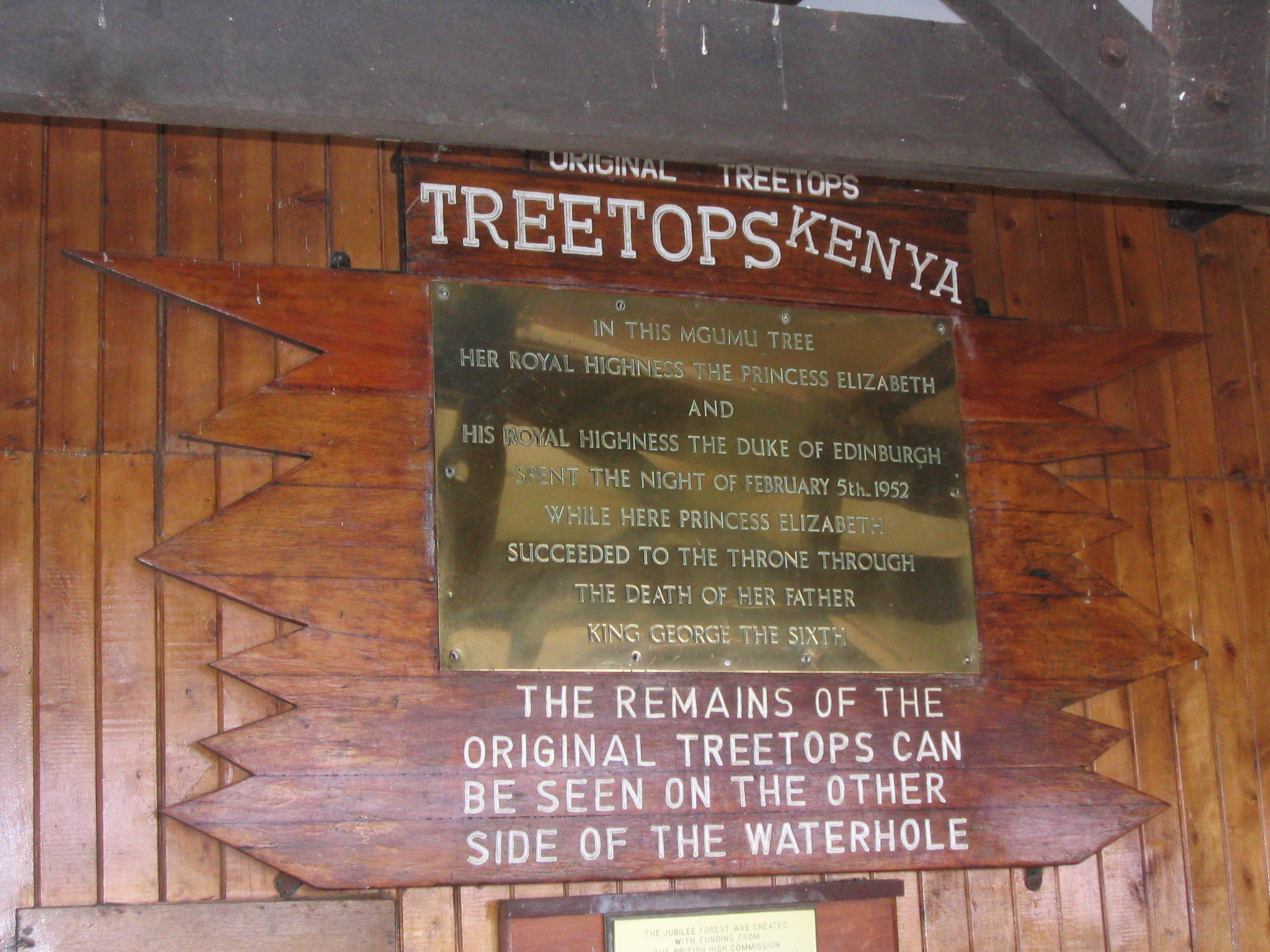
Commemorative Plaque at the Treetops Hotel (2005)

The visit of Princess Elizabeth and her husband Prince Philip, Duke of Edinburgh to Kenya in 1952 included a visit to Treetops as personal guests of the Walkers. The visit cemented the fame of the Treetops. The princess' stay, which coincided with the death of her father King George VI on the night of 5–6 February 1952, and consequently her succession to the throne, involved the Treetops in the worldwide publicity surrounding these events. The same night, before the event was known, Sir Horace Hearne, then Chief Justice of Kenya, had escorted the princess and her husband, Prince Philip, to a state dinner at Treetops. After word of George VI's death reached the new Queen the following day – when she had already left Treetops and was by this time at Sagana Lodge – she returned immediately to Britain. She was the first British monarch since King George I to be outside the country at the moment of succession.

The renowned hunter Jim Corbett, who was invited by the princess to accompany them during their stay there, wrote in the visitors' book:

For the first time in the history of the world, a young girl climbed into a tree one day a Princess and after having what she described as her most thrilling experience she climbed down from the tree next day a Queen – God bless her.

Corbett, the resident "hunter" at Treetops, also wrote about the visit in his final book Tree Tops, which was published by the Oxford University Press in October 1955, six months after Corbett's death (19 April 1955). Archival footage of the royal visit has also survived. Queen Elizabeth II made a return visit in 1983.

== Political unrest ==
The Mau Mau Uprising, which began as a protest in 1951 and 1952 of British control in the Kikuyu homeland quickly became a violent uprising. It was suppressed by the British over the period 1952–1956. In 1953, the Aberdare forest provided refuge to many hundreds of Mau Mau rebels, led by Dedan Kimathi. In June 1953, the entire region was declared off-limits for Africans, and orders to shoot Africans on sight were set in place. A major military operation in late 1953 ("Operation Blitz") left 125 guerillas dead. This was followed in January 1954 by "Operation Hammer", led by the King's African Rifles, which however failed to encounter many guerillas as most had already left the area. As a protest against the shoot-on-sight orders, and repeated military action, Mau Mau rebels burnt down the Treetops Hotel (which acted as a lookout for the King's African Rifles) on 27 May 1954 in a contentious military action or act of terror. The incident took place as the uprising was slowly being brought to an end by British military action.

== Second structure and enlargement ==
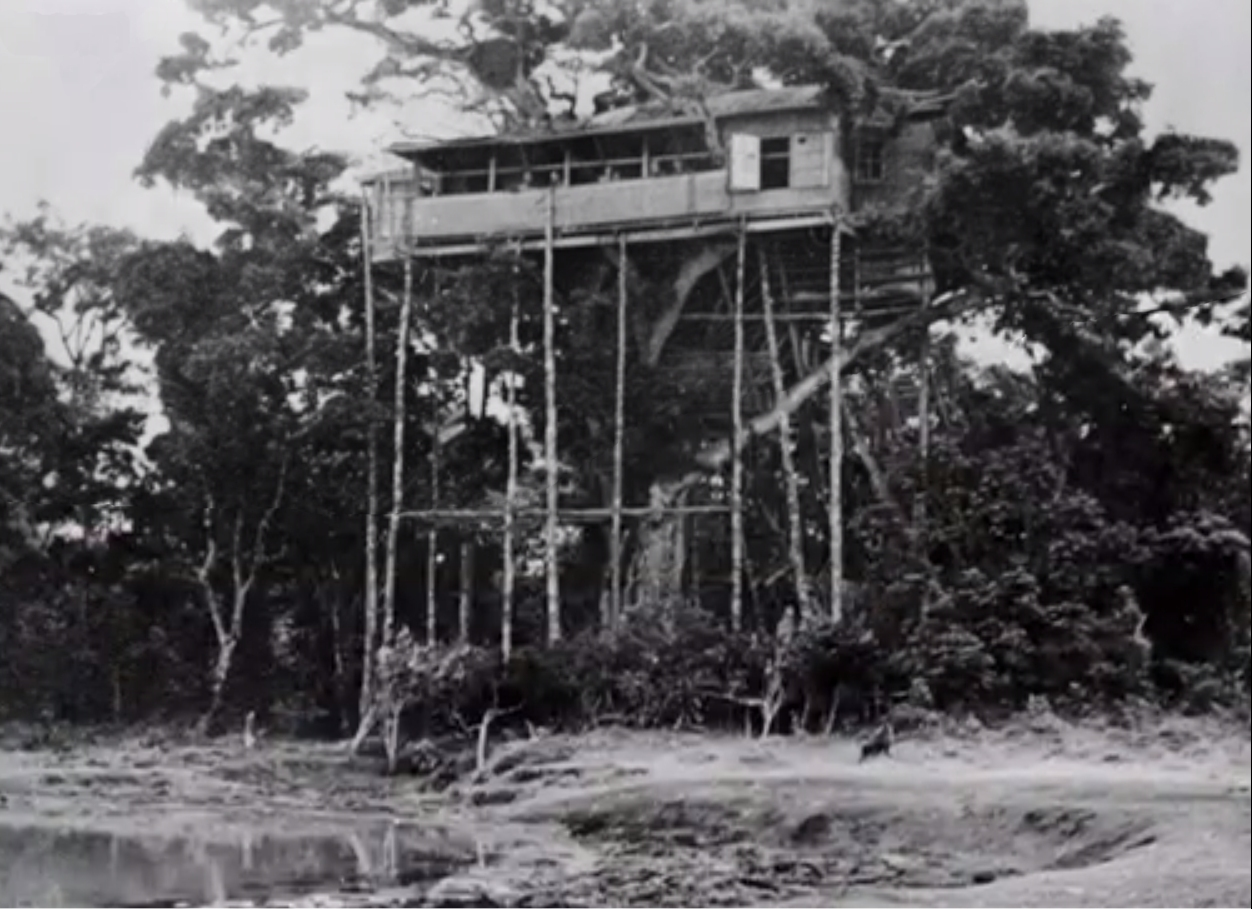
The second structure, on one level

Treetops was rebuilt in a nearby chestnut tree overlooking the same waterhole and salt lick near the elephant migration pathway to Mount Kenya. The facility became so popular that rising demand required a new, larger structure, and this was supported further by poles as well as the tree itself.

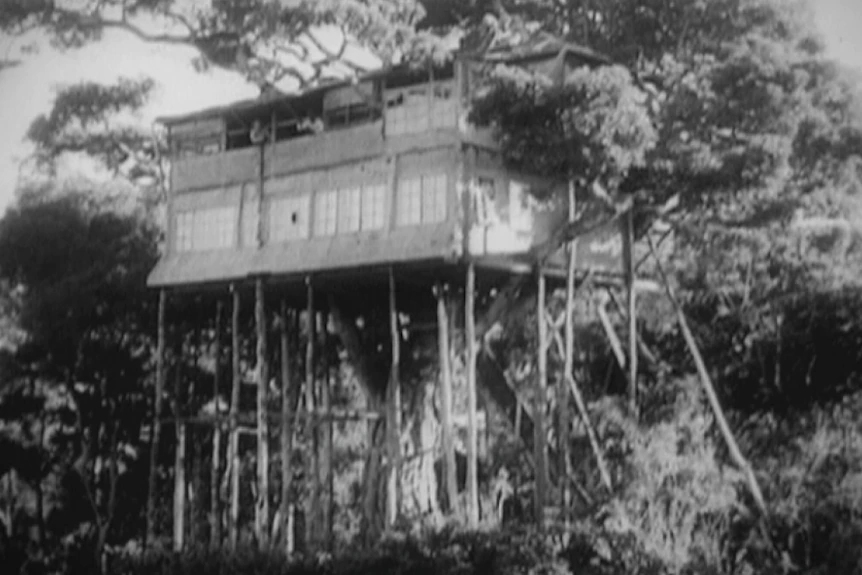
Two-level structure

Further demand required the Walkers to accommodate more visitors. Treetops had another level added, and was reinforced - see picture below right. Its capacity was increased to four rooms, including one for a resident hunter.

== Recent years ==
Cover of Eric Walker's book about the Treetops Hotel which he founded and ran

Further increased demand flowing from the publicity surrounding the Queen's accession there, the name Treetops was transferred, with the addition of the word "Hotel" to a new 35-room structure on additional stilt supports. It had four decks and a rooftop viewing platform. Due to the quick change in profile of the rustic tree lodge, National Geographic ran an article A New Look at Kenya's "Treetops" in October 1956.

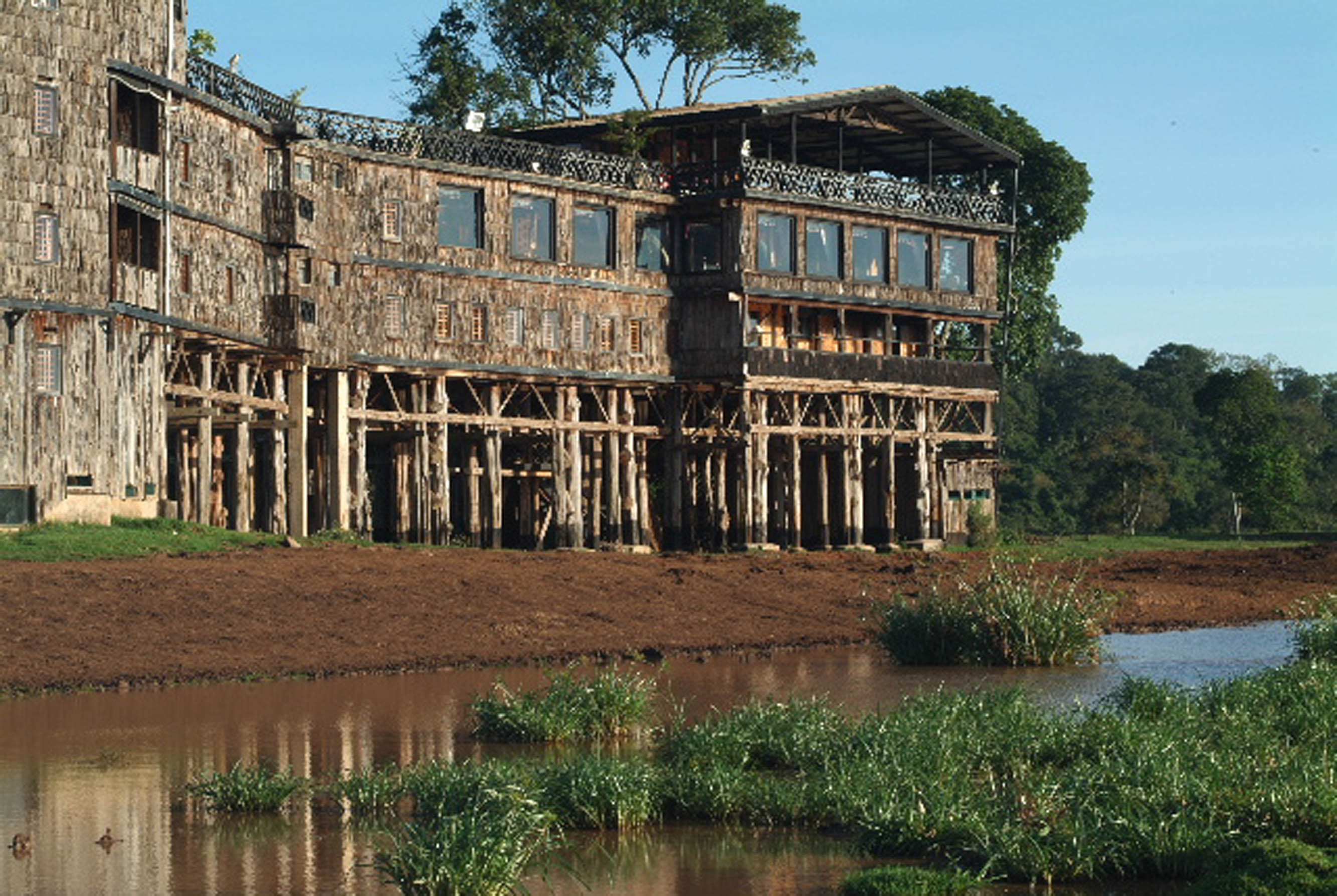
The view of the waterholes from the Treetops Hotel

Treetops' popularity was additionally due to its "no see, no pay" policy during their early years – a common business policy on safaris, where guests were not charged for services if they failed to see any big game. Visitors could observe the wildlife from the top deck, the viewing windows in the communal space, or from ground level hides. They could also take motor tours from the Treetops. While on overnight destination, only overnight luggage was allowed, with visitors being driven in from the Outspan Hotel for the night. Other facilities included a thousand-watt artificial moon used to illuminate animals at the waterhole during darkness. Another unusual restriction at the Treetops was a low-decibel noise-level restriction due to the hearing sensitivity of many animals; this included a ban on all hard-soled footwear.

The hotel closed in October 2021; it had been unable to host any guests for over a year due to a drop in tourism caused by the COVID-19 pandemic. It reopened in August 2024 during a ceremony which was attended by Deputy President Rigathi Gachagua and other dignitaries, including British High Commissioner Neil Wigan.

== Management ==
In 1966, when Eric Walker was 79, he sold the Outspan Hotel, and with it, Treetops, to the Block Hotel group. Eric Walker died in 1976, aged 89. Aberdare Safari Hotels acquired the two properties in 1978. Following the success of Treetops, another treetop lodge – the Shimba, was opened by the Aberdare Safari Hotels group in the Shimba Hills National Reserve.

Aberdare Safari Hotels embarked on an initiative dubbed "Return the Bush" in conjunction with the Kenya Wildlife Service. The initiative involved the rehabilitation of 125 hectares (310 acres) of the Aberdare National Park, that had been degraded by the impact of the fenced-in elephant population on the ecosystem. Electric fencing for the paddock covering an area of 16.5 ha (41 acres) around the lodge was installed. The paddocking allowed reforestation as well as the natural regeneration of the local flora within the paddock.

== Notable visitors ==
Famous personalities who have visited the Treetops include Charlie Chaplin, Joan Crawford and Lord Mountbatten, and a return visit by Elizabeth II in 1983.

Lord Baden-Powell, founder of the Boy Scouts movement, was a resident of Nyeri and a frequent visitor to Treetops. In 1938, he commissioned a cottage on the grounds of The Outspan Hotel, which he named Paxtu. The final resting place of Lord and Lady Baden-Powell is located nearby. Jim Corbett — hunter, conservationist, and author — who accompanied Elizabeth II during her stay at Treetops on 6 February 1952, lived in the same house as Baden-Powell, and is buried nearby, next to Lord Baden-Powell and his wife Olave, Lady Baden-Powell.

Author Willard Price visited while researching his novel Safari Adventure.

Paul McCartney and Beatles roadie Mal Evans stayed at the hotel while on safari in 1966. Returning from the safari trip, McCartney stated that he came up with the concept of "Sgt. Pepper's Lonely Hearts Club Band" on the flight from Nairobi to London.
