= Dedan Kimathi University of Technology =

University in Nyeri, Kenya

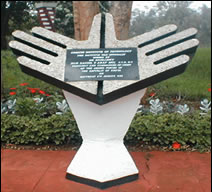
- DeKUT Logo sculpture at the Old Administration Block
- Other names: DeKUT, Kimathi
- Former names: Kimathi Institute of Technology (K.I.T.), Kimathi University College of Technology (KUCT)
- Motto: Better Life through Technology
- Type: Public
- Established: 2012
- Academic affiliations: College of the Rockies
- Chancellor: Gen (rtd) Julius W. Karangi
- Vice-Chancellor: Prof. Peter N. Muchiri
- Undergraduates: ~12,000
- Postgraduates: ~500
- Location: Nyeri, Kenya; 0°23′43″S 36°57′45″E
- Campus: 990 acres (400 ha); Suburban
- Colors: Gold, red and green
- Website: www.dkut.ac.ke

Dedan Kimathi University of Technology (or DeKUT) is a public university in Nyeri, Kenya.

== History ==
It is one of 22 public universities in Kenya, having started as a constituent college of Jomo Kenyatta University of Agriculture and Technology since the year 2007 until it was chartered to become a fully fledged public university on 14 December 2012.

It was the first university in Kenya to be chartered under the new universities act of 2012 and the eighth public university to be established in the country.

It started as a middle-level national technical and business-oriented learning institution in 1972 and was elevated in 2007 to a constituent university college of Jomo Kenyatta University of Agriculture and Technology through a Kenya Gazette notice to become a full-fledged university in three years. However, this came later on 14 December 2012 when President Mwai Kibaki officiated and awarded the institution a charter in a ceremony attended by government officials and higher education stakeholders.

It is located 6 km from Nyeri along the Nyeri – Mweiga highway. The college land spans about 1,000 acres (4.0 km^{2}) consisting of 350 acres (1.4 km^{2}) of natural forest, 350 acres (1.4 km^{2}) of mature coffee and 300 acres (1.2 km^{2}) of open space for expansion

On 26 November 2008 construction of a multipurpose resource centre began. The second phase, out of four, of this project reached completion in late 2010. It serves as the main hub for activities and events in the college.

== History ==
DeKUT started operating as a technical institute in 1978. Since August 2007 to the award of the Charter, it operated as a constituent university college. DeKUT was granted a charter to become a degree-awarding institution on 14 December 2012. It operates under the Ministry of Education, Science and Technology.

== Academics ==
DeKUT offers academic programmes at the undergraduate and graduate levels through five schools and five institutes.

The schools and institutes are:

- School of Business Management and Economics;
- School of Engineering;
- School of Science;
- School of Computer Science and Information Technology;
- School of Nursing;
- Institute of Geomatics, GIS and Remote Sensing;
- Institute of Food Bioresources Technology;
- Geothermal Energy Training and Research Institute;
- School of Graduate Studies and Research;
- Institute of Tourism and Hospitality Management; and Institute of Technical and Professional Studies (ITPS). ITPS offers programmes at the technical diploma level.

== Administration ==
It is run through an appointed University Council. The chancellor, vice chancellor and permanent secretaries in the Ministries of Higher Education and Finance are members of the council.

The current Vice Chancellor of DeKUT is Prof. Peter N. Muchiri.

The current Council Chairperson is Dr James Kariuki.

== Campus ==
DeKUT is situated six kilometers from Nyeri town along the Nyeri-Nyahururu road, between Mt. Kenya, on the Eastern side, and Aberdare Mountains, on the western side.

The university has a coffee farm that acts as its research center for coffee research and development, and a wildlife conservancy that hosts animals including llamas, wildebeests and zebras.

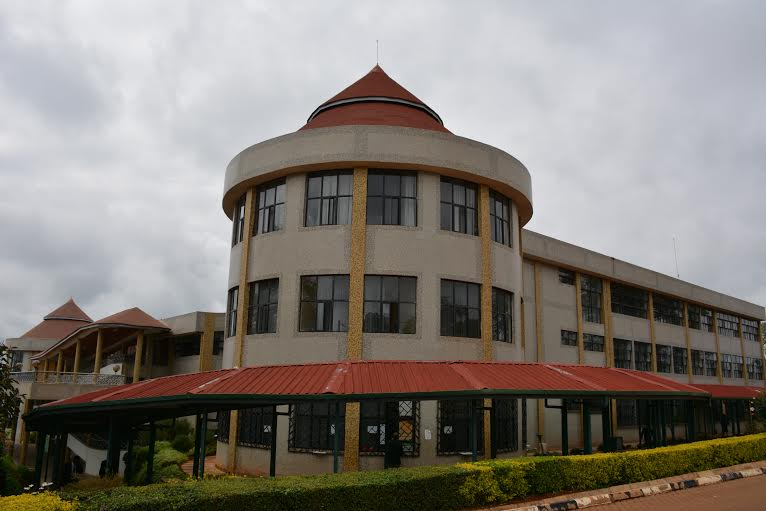
Dedan Kimathi University of Technology Resource Centre

== Academic facilities ==
The resource centre is divided into four phases with the two phases complete. The first and second phase includes a library, lecture theatres and laboratories and supporting infrastructure and serves as the hub of the university's academic activities. The Academic Block houses ICT labs, lecture rooms and offices engineering labs, workshops, and supporting physics and chemistry labs. The university's Advanced Manufacturing Training Center (ADMaTC) houses workshops for all engineering courses.

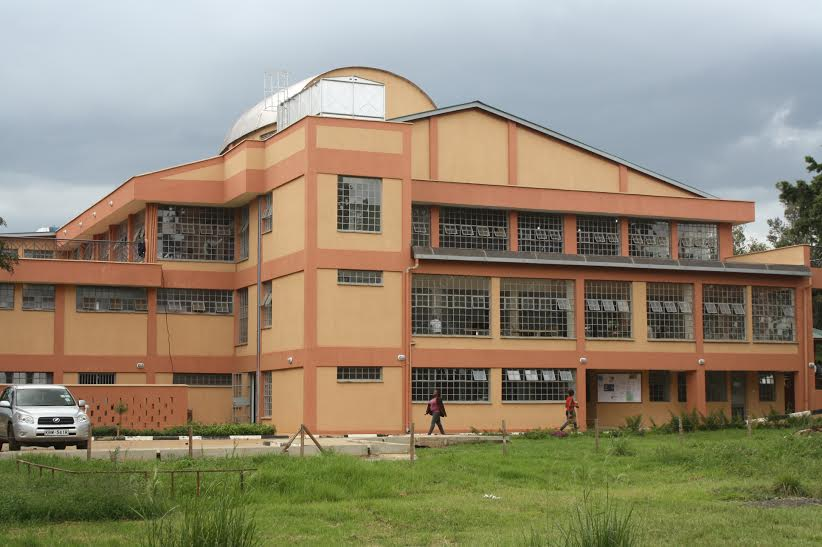
Catering block

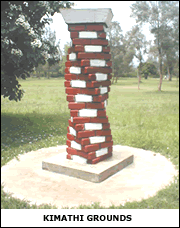
Sculpture at Kimathi Grounds

== Student life ==
Private hostels have been set up around the university to house most of the students. Sports include rugby, football, hockey, basketball and volleyball teams. It hosts the Mt. Kenya 7s rugby tournament every year among other inter-university tournaments.

Clubs and societies include the Christian Union, Catholic Action, Presidential Awards club, Touch Crew International, Actuarial Association of Kimathi and the ICT Club. The ICT Club hosts hackathons.

The students are represented by the Dedan Kimathi University Students' Organization (DeKUTSO) that is elected every year the council have almost 13 officials.

=== Housing and sports facilities ===
Kimathi has six halls of residence, one of which houses female students. The majority of students live off-campus. Transport is provided by the school to and from Nyeri town and estates where some students reside. Off-campus accommodation around the school is readily available as private developers have invested in hostels near the school. Off-campus residences include Sunrise hostels, Catholic hostels and Greens.

Campus meals are served by the school mess and a few off-campus food places. The student's Centre is available for students to socialize, watch TV and play pool.

Sports facilities include a rugby football field; volleyball, basketball and badminton courts; and a field hockey pitch.

== See also ==
- List of universities in Kenya
- Education in Kenya
