= Sagana Lodge =

Building in Kenya

Coordinates: 0°21′46.7″S 37°04′04.9″E

Sagana State Lodge is a Kenyan state lodge, located in Kiganjo town in Nyeri County, on the foothills of Mount Kenya. The lodge is used by the President when on official tours of the country. It was here that Queen Elizabeth II heard the news of King George VI's death and that she had succeeded to the throne in 1952.

== History ==
=== Colonial history ===
Sagana Lodge was built in 1949–1950 as a royal residence. It was a wedding present in 1947 to the Duke and Duchess of Edinburgh (later the Duke of Edinburgh and Queen Elizabeth II respectively) from the colony whilst they were in Kenya. The lodge was leased to the couple by the government of Kenya.

In 1952 the Duke and Duchess of Edinburgh were staying at Sagana Lodge upon their return from Treetops Hotel. The beginning of the Mau Mau Rebellion had made Kenya less secure and Ian Henderson, of Kenya Police Force Special Branch, was appointed head of the security detail at Sagana Lodge. While staying at Sagana Lodge, Elizabeth received the news that her father King George VI had died and she had succeeded to the throne as Queen Elizabeth II. This was a unique circumstance for such an event. She was the first British monarch since the accession of George I to be outside Great Britain at the moment of succession, and also the first in modern times not to know the exact time of her accession (because her father had died in his sleep at an unknown time).

=== Post-colonial history ===
The lease to Sagana Lodge was returned to Kenya in 1963.

In 1976, it, along with several other official residences of the President of Kenya, were declared protected zones. The lodge's most prominent use, in independent Kenya's history was when Mwai Kibaki, then the president of Kenya, and Raila Odinga, used the site as a retreat to come to agreement on Kenya's grand coalition government.
