= Muthui Kariuki =

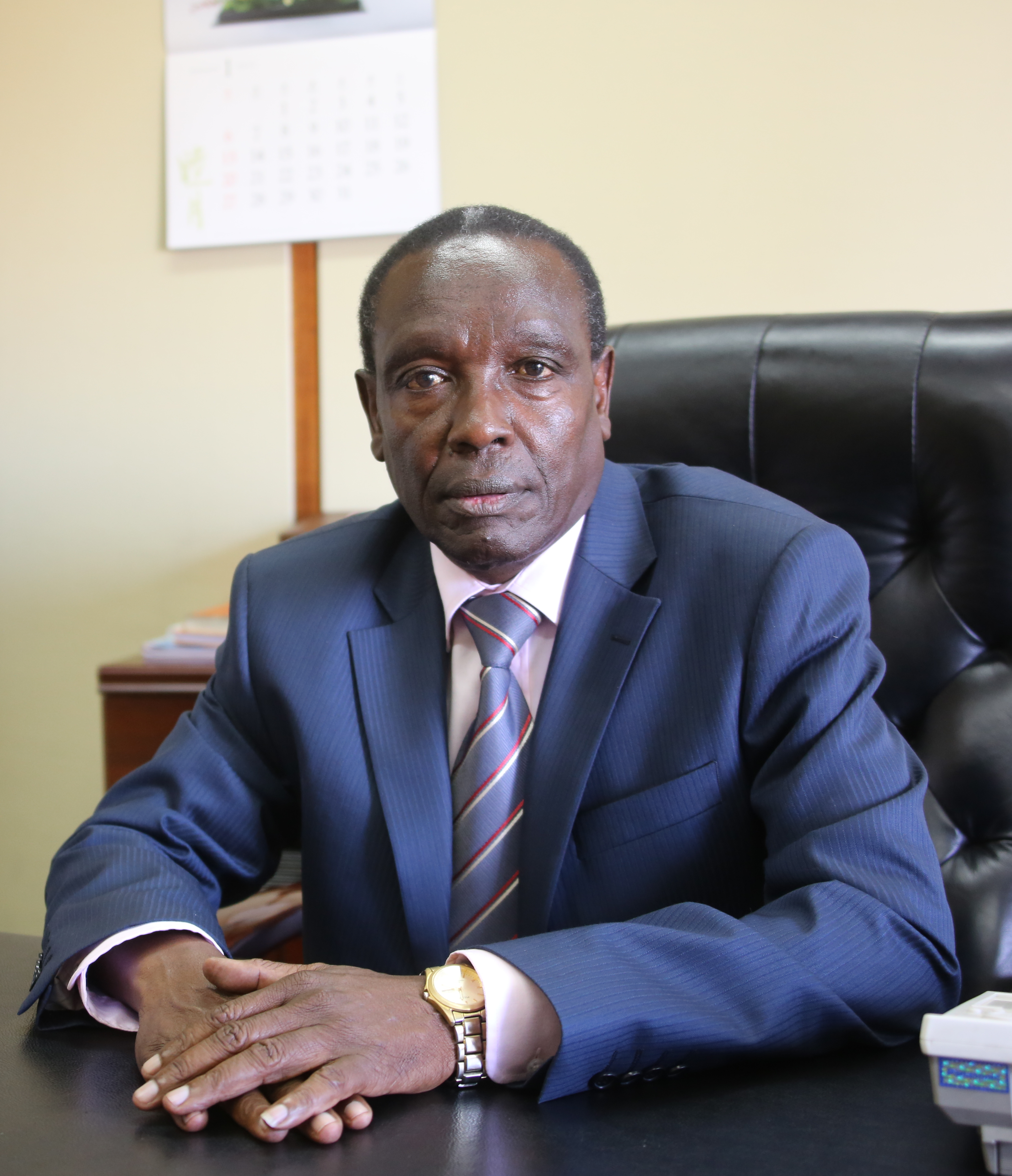

Personal details
- Born: Muthui Kariuki; 26 June 1956 (age 69)
- Occupation: Government Official

Muthui Kariuki was born on 26 June 1956. He was the second official spokesman for the government of Kenya, a post he was appointed to by the president of Kenya on 22 November 2012 and held until 8 August 2013 when the office was dissolved. Muthui Kariuki holds a degree in education (Hons) from Kenyatta University, post-graduate diploma in Mass Communication from University of Nairobi and a master's degree in communication from University of Nairobi.

== Background ==
Muthui M. Kariuki is a professional teacher and one of the best PR practitioners in Kenya. In his teaching career Muthui taught English and literature at Starehe Boys Center for five years, from 1981 to 1985. Some of his prominent students include Kwamchetsi Makokha and Peter Kenneth (a presidential candidate in the 2013 general elections).

== Public relations career ==
His Public Relations career kicked off when he was appointed the Assistant Public Relations Manager at Kenya Breweries Limited, now known as East African Breweries in 1987, a position he held for 5 years until 1992 when he was promoted to the position of Deputy Public Relations Manager. In 1997 he became the PR manager, a position he held for 2 years. During his tenure at the brewery, Muthui also held the position of Editor of Tembo Times, the official magazine of Kenya Breweries, and official company speech writer.

== Kibaki campaign ==
In 2002, he joined President Mwai Kibaki's campaign team as a PR practitioner.

== Office of the Vice President ==
In 2010 Muthui was appointed to the office of the vice president as an adviser on media and communications to the vice president, Kalonzo Musyoka.

== Office of Public Communications ==
In November 2012 Muthui Kariuki was appointed to take over the office of public communications for the government of Kenya as the official Government's spokesman. This is a presidential appointment and Muthui took office immediately replacing Alfred Mutua who had held the position for 8 years before resigning to join politics.
