= Yucatec Maya people =

Maya people of Mexico and Belize

Yucatec Mayas
- Flag of the Yucatec Maya people

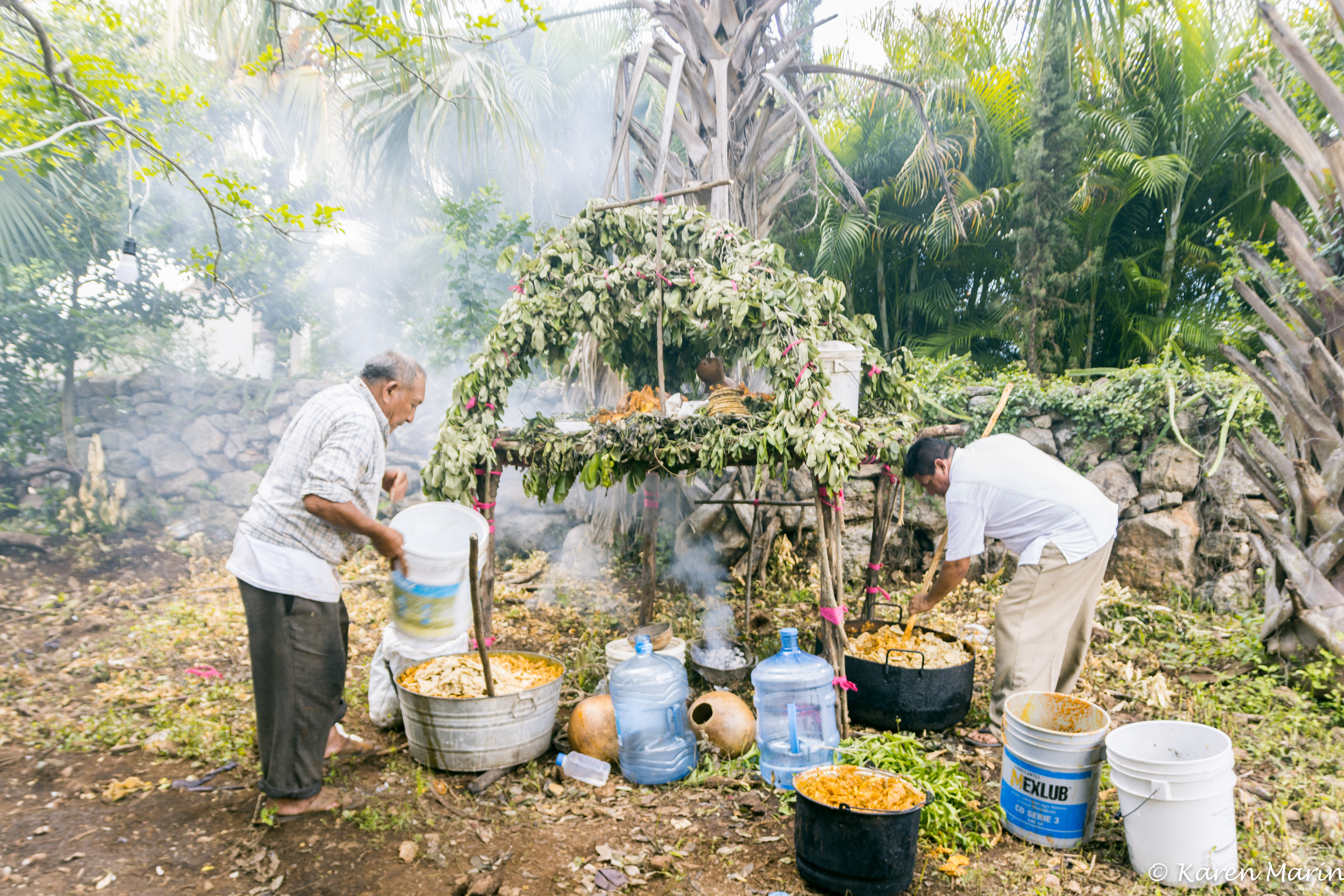
- Yucatec Mayas performing a ritual to request rain

Total population
- 1,646,782 (2020)

Regions with significant populations
- Mexico (Yucatán, Campeche and Quintana Roo), Belize

Languages
- Yucatec Maya and Spanish

Religion
- Christianity (predominantly Roman Catholic and Pentecostal), and Indigenous religion

Related ethnic groups
- Tzeltal · Tzotzil · Other Maya peoples

The Yucatec Mayas or Peninsular Mayans are Maya people who live in the Yucatan Peninsula in the Mexican states of Yucatán, Campeche and Quintana Roo and in the Districts of Corozal and Orange Walk in Belize. The vast majority of them speak the Yucatec Maya language.

== Language ==
The Yucatec Maya language, called Máaya t'áan in their own language, is the most spoken Maya language in the Yucatán Peninsula and the second-most spoken Maya language after Kʼicheʼ. In 2000, 799,696 people in Mexico spoke the language. The language is also known simply as "Maya."

The term Maaya comes from the Yucatec Maya language, and was applied to all Maya peoples by Western scholars.

== History ==
=== Precontact ===
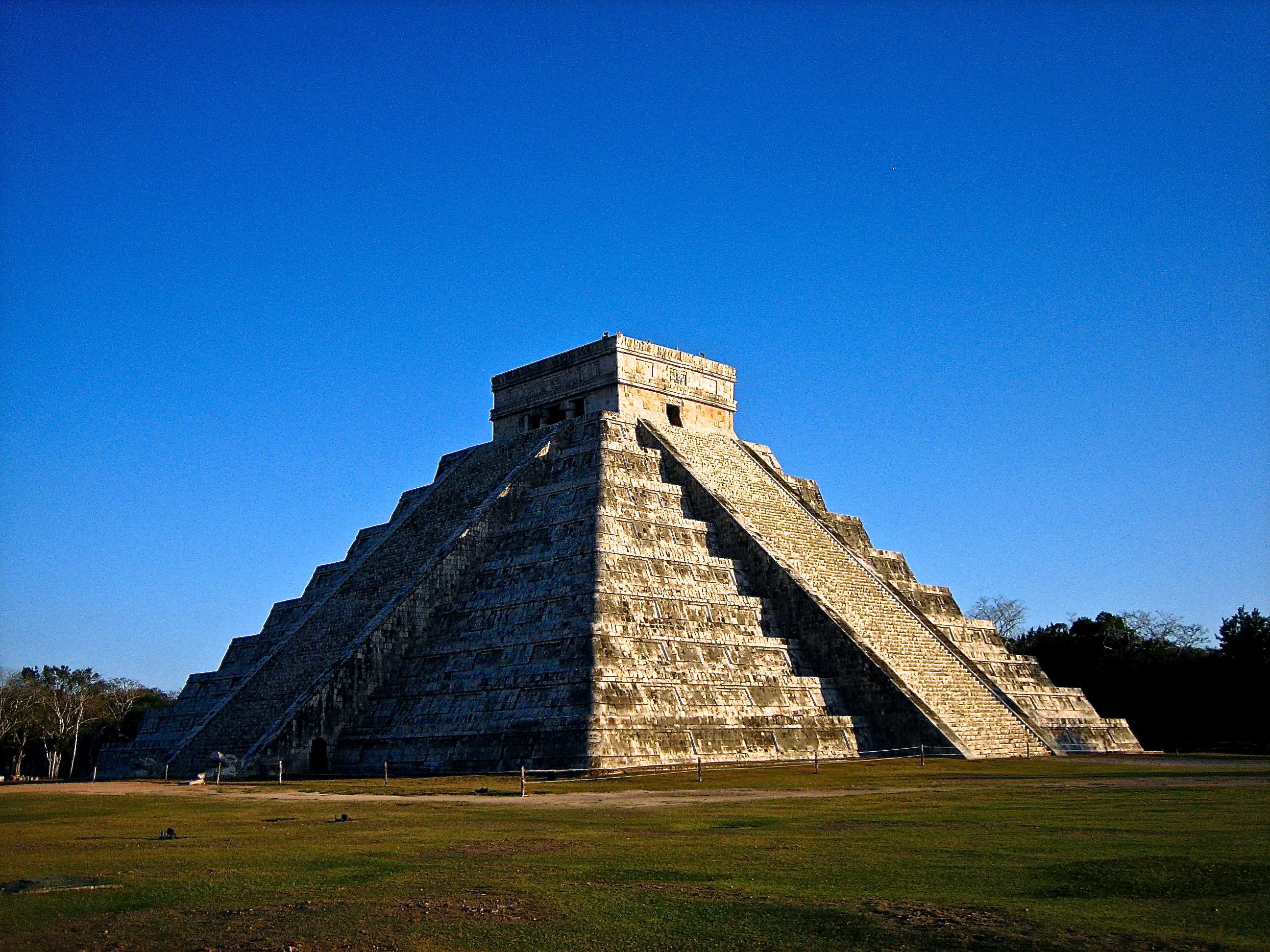
The Temple of Kukulcán in Chichén Itzá.

Maya people have lived in the Yucatán Peninsula for at least 7,000 years. The Preclassic period spanned from 2000 BC to AD 250. During this time the early Mayan civilization rose.

The Classic period was 300 to 900, and the Postclassic period was 1000 to 1500.

=== Postcontact ===
The Yucatec Maya first encountered Europeans with Spanish explorer Vicente Yáñez Pinzón arrived on their shores in 1508. He was followed by Juan de Valdivia's expedition that shipwrecked in 1511. Two surviving Spaniards intermarried with the Maya; one who stayed with the Maya was Gonzalo Guerrero.

The kuchkabalo'ob of Yucatán after The League of Mayapan / borders closely resemble those of the provinces that were there before / 2009 map / via Wikimedia Commons

In the early 16th century, the Yucatán was home to 16 Maya states, called cuchcabal (jurisdiction), which were, as ethnohistorian Ralph L. Roys wrote, "remarkably uniform in language, customs, and fundamental political ideas." Because of this political and cultural cohesion, they can be seen as provinces or autonomous states of the same polity. Due to their decentralized governments, Maya states resisted Spanish control for centuries; however, an estimate 90 percent of the Indigenous people died from introduced European diseases.

In the 16th century, the Spanish introduced the Encomienda system of land grants, which drew local Maya leaders into the Spanish Empire.

After Mexico gained independence from Spain in 1821, the War of Castes began in the Yucatan Peninsula in 1847 and continued through 1901. Cecilio Chi, Jacinto Pat and Manuel Antonio Ay were the three main leaders of the war during the first stage. The war ends with the entrance of the federal army Mexican to Chan Santa Cruz in 1901. While some Yucatec Maya lived in northern Belize, many more fled there from Mexico after the Caste War.

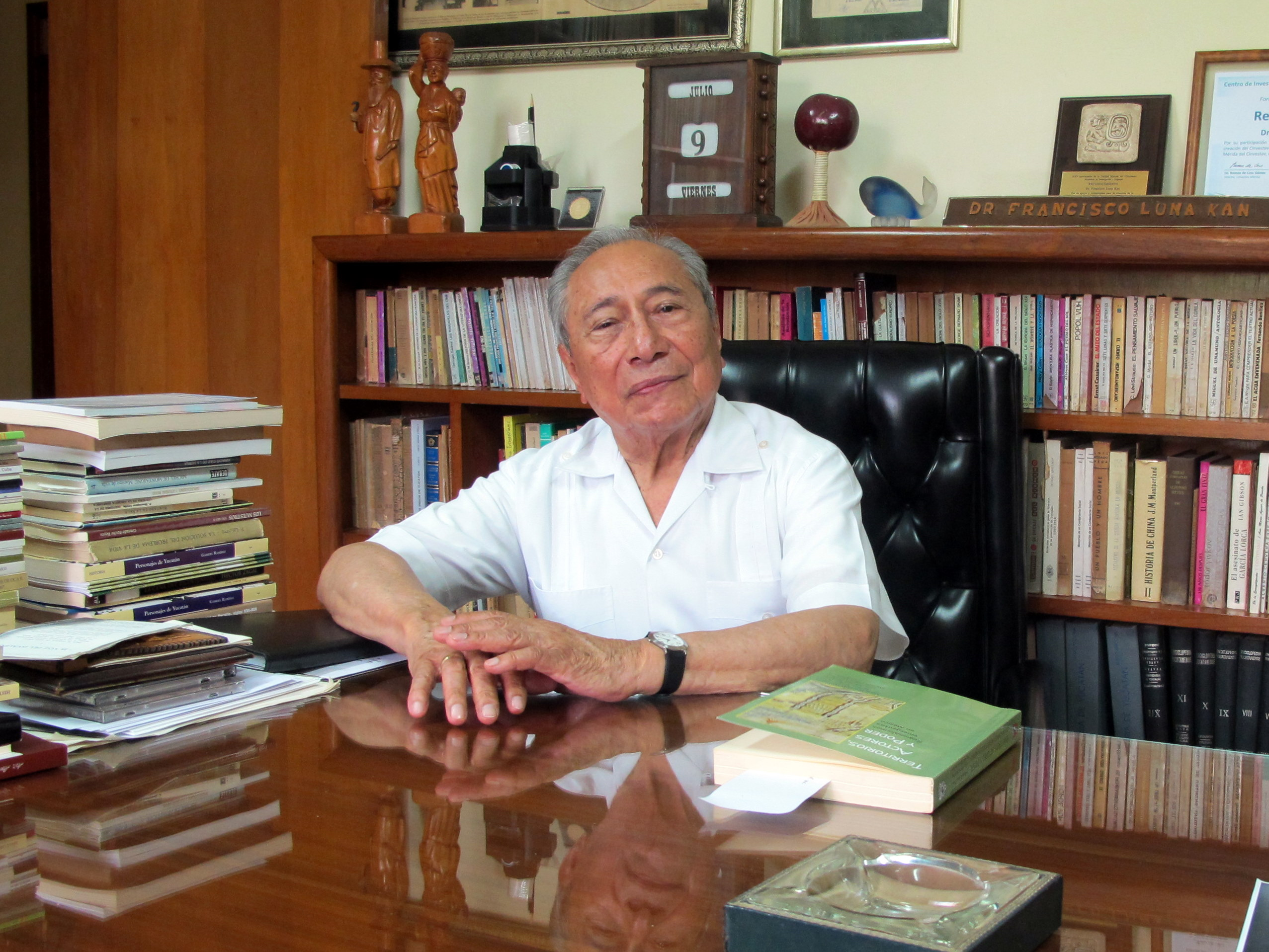
Former Governor of Yucatán Francisco Luna Kan (Yucatec Maya), a medical doctor

In 1976, a full-blood Yucatec Maya medical doctor, Francisco Luna Kan was elected governor of the state of Yucatán, marking a significant development of Yucatec Maya political influence. He served through 1982 and improved rural healthcare throughout the state. Since his election dozens of Yucatec Maya people have served in political offices.

== Culture ==
The typical women's dress is made up of the huipil decorated with flowers on the neck, the doublet, which goes on top of the hipil, and the fustian, which goes to the bottom. The terno is only used during important celebrations. and it is the hipil that is used every day. The typical men's costume consists of a white guayabera, white pants, a hippie hat and a red bandanna.

The best known tradition is that of the Janal Pixan (lunch of the ánimas), in which they create altars of rendados to the dead persons.

== Demographics ==
Currently there are 1,646,782 Yucatec Mayans in Mexican territory. The Mexican state which has the largest population belonging to this ethnic group is Yucatán.

In the 1921 Mexican census, 155,155 (43.31%) of the 14,334,780 people in the state of Yucatán were categorized as being purely Indigenous, while 121,189 (33.8%) were categorized as being indígena mezclada con blanca or mestizo.

== See also ==
- Maya civilization
- Chichen Itza
- Indigenous peoples of Mexico
