= Manuel Antonio Ay =

Yucatec Maya military leader and Mexican revolutionary

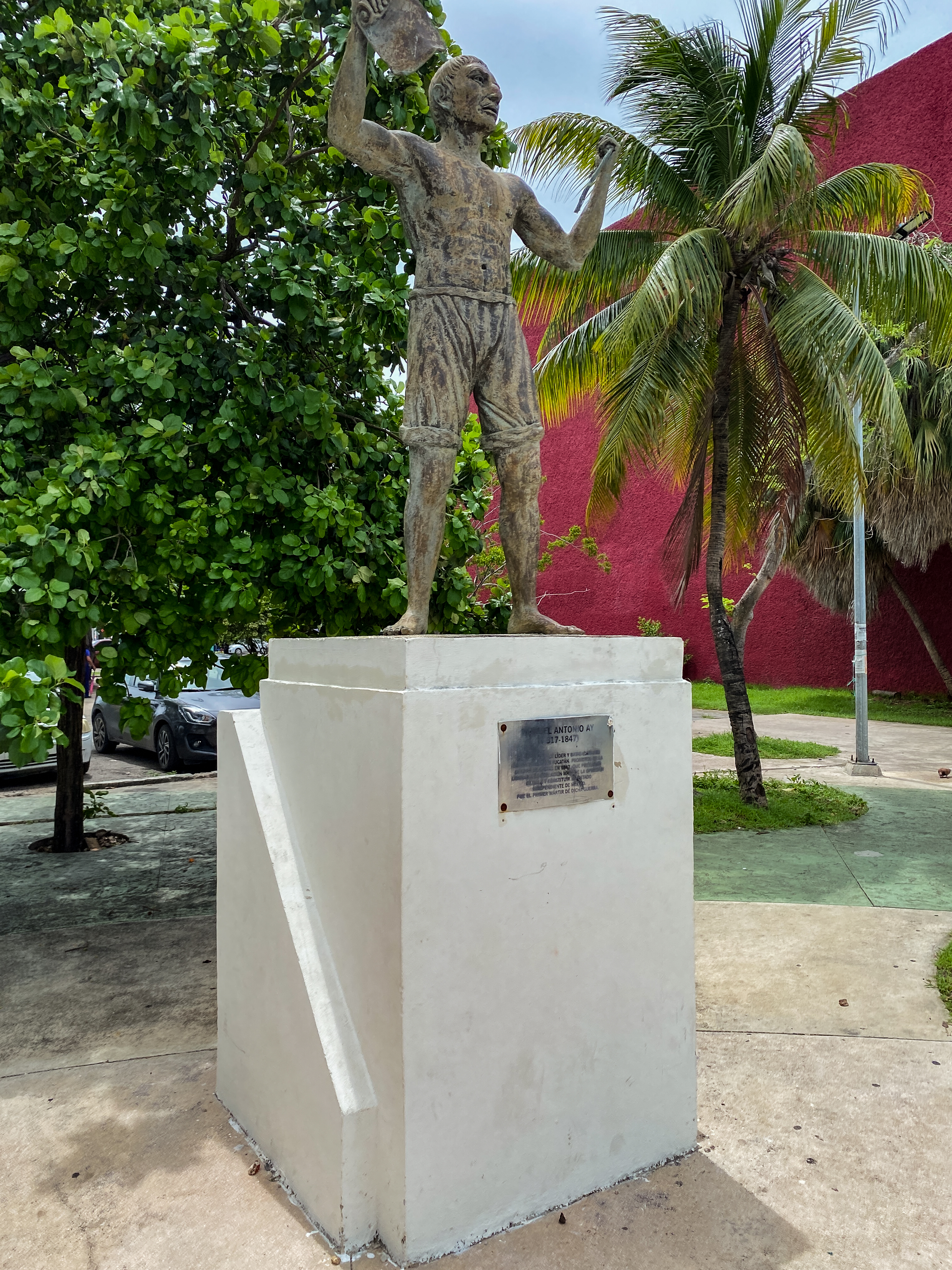
- Sculpture by Manuel Antonio Ay in Chetumal
- Born: c. 1817; Chichimila, Yucatán
- Died: July 26, 1847 (30 years old); Valladolid, Yucatán
- Occupations: Batab, caudillo
- Children: Antonio

Manuel Antonio Ay (c. 1817– July 26, 1847) was a Yucatec Maya military leader and revolutionary, and chief of the village of Chichimilá.

== Life ==
Ay was the batab of Chichimilá. He would often help indigenous villagers with legal matters as he was literate while many of the local Maya could not read or write.

Ay fought in the 1846 rebellion against the Merida-based government of Miguel Barbachano, President of the Republic of Yucatán. He participated in the capture of Chemax in 1846 and Valladolid in 1847 under the orders of Colonel Antonio Trujeque and with the support of Santiago Méndez. However, after their military success, many of the Maya troops decided to declare independence themselves, putting them at odds with Méndez.

Ay was one of the most active organizers of the indigenous insurrection. In 1847, he met with Cecilio Chi, Jacinto Pat, and Bonifacio Novelo to plan the uprising that would become the Caste War. Reportedly, he stated that his goal was to have the white men driven from the Peninsula. He was discovered when a bartender found a suspicious letter he had left in his hat signed by Chi. Once Colonel Eulogio Rosado, the Commandant of Valladolid, learned of the letter, he arrested Ay. Ay was put on trial from July 21 to 25 before he was sentenced to death by hanging. Rosado ordered his execution carried out in the plaza of the Santa Ana neighborhood of Valladolid on July 26. His corpse was transferred to Chichimilá, where it was covered and buried after being exhibited to warn the rebels. As a result of Ay's killing, Cecilio Chi and Jacinto Pat led an attack on the criollo residents of Tipich, beginning the Caste War.

Ay left behind a son named Antonio who helped capture Valladolid in 1848. After the Maya fighters entered the town, Antonio executed the man who had carried his father's letter to Colonel Rosado.

== Legacy ==
A statue of Ay is located in Chetumal, Quintana Roo next to a statue of Cecilio Chi. There is also a monument to Ay in the Santa Ana Park in Valladolid.
