= Jacinto Pat =

Maya leader and revolutionary

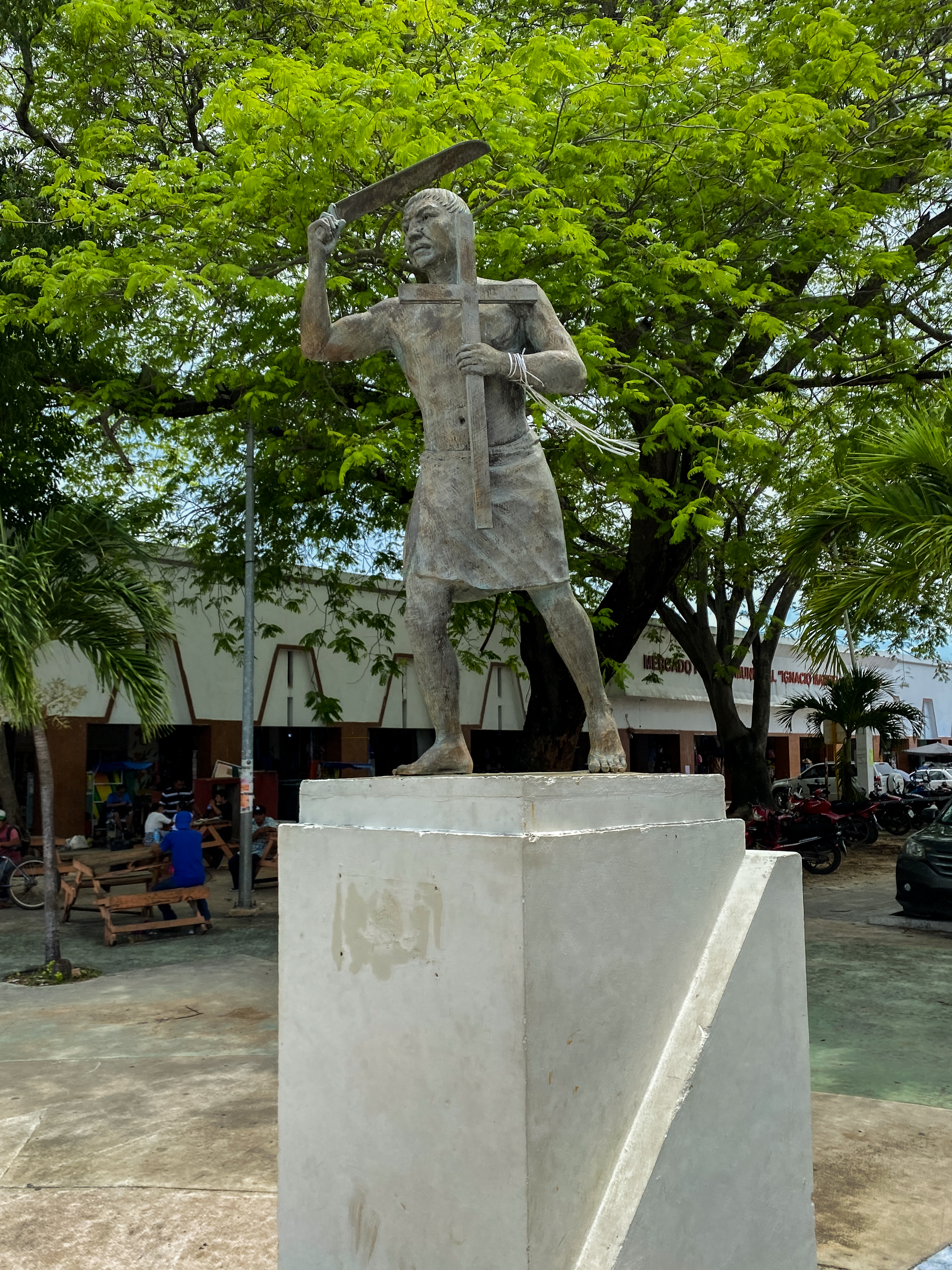
- Jacinto Pat sculpture in Chetumal
- Born: 1797; Tihosuco, Yucatán, New Spain
- Died: September 8, 1849 (52 years old); Holchén, Tekit Municipality, Yucatán
- Occupation(s): Batab, rebel leader
- Spouse: Feliciana Puc (1828 − 1849)

Jacinto Pat (1797 − September 8, 1849) was a Maya leader and batab best known for helping lead the rebels in the Caste War of Yucatán.

== Early life ==
According to the Encyclopedia of Quintana Roo, Pat is an ancient Mayan surname that means "to invent", "to create" and "to make things with clay or wax". Before the Spanish invasion, the Pat family ruled the Mayan chiefdom of Ekab and held power on the island of Cozumel. Ah Naum Pat was the Halach Uinik of Cozumel, and when the Spanish invaders arrived, many inhabitants of the island moved to the Yucatán peninsula. More than 70 families with the last name Pat lived in Cochuah, especially in Tihosuco.

Pat was from Tihosuco in present-day Quintana Roo. He was a landowner; his properties included Culumpich hacienda and Rancho Panabá.

== The Caste War ==
In 1847, a rebellion against the criollo government broke out when Pat joined with Cecilio Chi, a Maya batab from Tepich. After helping to lead the sack of Valladolid, Pat was given charge of the area south of Tihosuco. He was also in charge of procuring gunpowder and lead from Belize to supply Chi's troops.

Eventually, Pat and Chi clashed over opposing views. Pat wanted to focus on political negotiations to establish a Mayan state while Chi preferred to keep fighting until there were no criollo or white residents left in Yucatán. Pat signed the Tzucacab Treaty with the government of Yucatán in April 1848. The treaty established him as the Grand Cacique of Yucatán over the indigenous population, decreased mandatory marriage and baptism fees levied on the indigenous population and provided for the return of weapons confiscated from the Maya population. However, Chi did not recognize the treaty's validity and continued fighting until his murder in December 1848.

== Death ==
After the death of Cecilio Chi, Maya caudillo José Venancio Pec declared Pat a traitor for signing the Tzucacab Treaty. On September 8, 1849, Pat was assassinated by Pec in the village of Holchén.

== Legacy ==
After his death, Pat became a folk hero among the Maya and many legends appeared regarding his life. A statue of Pat by Mexican sculptor Antonio Castellanos is located outside of the Museo de la Cultura Maya in Chetumal. There is also a statue of Pat in his hometown of Tihosuco at the Caste War Museum and one in Mexico City on the Paseo de la Reforma.

== Personal life ==
Pat was married to Feliciana Puc and had three sons, Esteban, Silvestre and Marcelo, who fought in the rebellion with him. The couple also had two daughters. Pat's son Marcelo was killed in the battle of Oxkutzcab.

== See also ==
- Francisco May Pech
