= Tekit Municipality =

Municipality in the Mexican state of Yucatán

Tekit
- Municipality
- Region 7 Sur #080

- Location of the Municipality in Mexico
- Coordinates: 20°31′56″N 89°19′53″W
- Country: Mexico
- State: Yucatán
- Mexico Ind.: 1821
- Yucatán Est.: 1824

Government
  - Type: 2012–2015
  - Municipal President: Luis Enrique Medina Bacelis

Area
  - Total: 219.71 km^{2} (84.83 sq mi)
- Elevation: 16 m (52 ft)

Population (2010)
  - Total: 9,884
  - Density: 44.99/km^{2} (116.5/sq mi)
  - Demonym: Umanense
- Time zone: UTC-6 (Central Standard Time)
- INEGI Code: 80
- Major Airport: Merida (Manuel Crescencio Rejón) International Airport
- IATA Code: MID
- ICAO Code: MMMD

Tekit Municipality (In the Yucatec Maya Language: “place which sprawls") is a municipality in the Mexican state of Yucatán containing 219.71 km^{2} of land and is located roughly 65 km southeast of the city of Mérida.

== History ==
There is no accurate data on when the town was founded, but during the conquest, it was part of the chieftainship of Tutul Xiu. At colonization, Tekit became part of the encomienda system with a series of encomendaros: Fernando de Bracamonte (1549); Pedro de Ancona and Pedro de Ancona Frías (1700); and Narcisa de Castro y Aguilar (1751), among others. The chiefs after conquest included Alfonso Xiú (1557) and Diego Xiú (1581).

Yucatán declared its independence from the Spanish Crown in 1821, and in 1825 the area was assigned to the low sierra partition of Mama Municipality. In 1845 it was transferred to the Tecoh Municipality but was deserted during the Caste War of Yucatán. In 1867, Tekit was transferred to the Ticul Municipality and in 1988 was confirmed as head of its own municipality.

== Governance ==
The municipal president is elected for a three-year term. The town council has seven councilpersons, who serve as Secretary and councilors of public works; education, sports and culture; potable water; ecology; nomenclature; and public monuments.

The Municipal Council administers the business of the municipality. It is responsible for budgeting and expenditures and producing all required reports for all branches of the municipal administration. Annually it determines educational standards for schools.

The Police Commissioners ensure public order and safety. They are tasked with enforcing regulations, distributing materials and administering rulings of general compliance issued by the council.

== Communities ==
The head of the municipality is Tekit, Yucatán. There are 23 populated areas of the municipality including: Chacsiniché, Chacsuy, Dolores Aké, Ixmequel, Jesús, Kankirisché, Kinchahua, San Antonio, San Isidro, San José, San Juan de la Mata, San Nicolás I, San Nicolás II, San Rafael, Santa Cruz, Tixcacal, Tomchún, Ualchén, Wkuim, Xconlum, Xixil, Xtoquitón and Yaxic. The significant populations are shown below:

| Community | Population |
|---|---|
| Entire Municipality (2010) | 9,884 |
| Tekit | 9087 in 2005 |

== Local festivals ==
Every year on 13 June the town celebrates a festival in honor of San Antonio de Padua.

== Tourist attractions ==
- Church of Saint Anthony of Padua, built in the sixteenth century
- archaeological site at Chumula
