= Cecilio Chi =

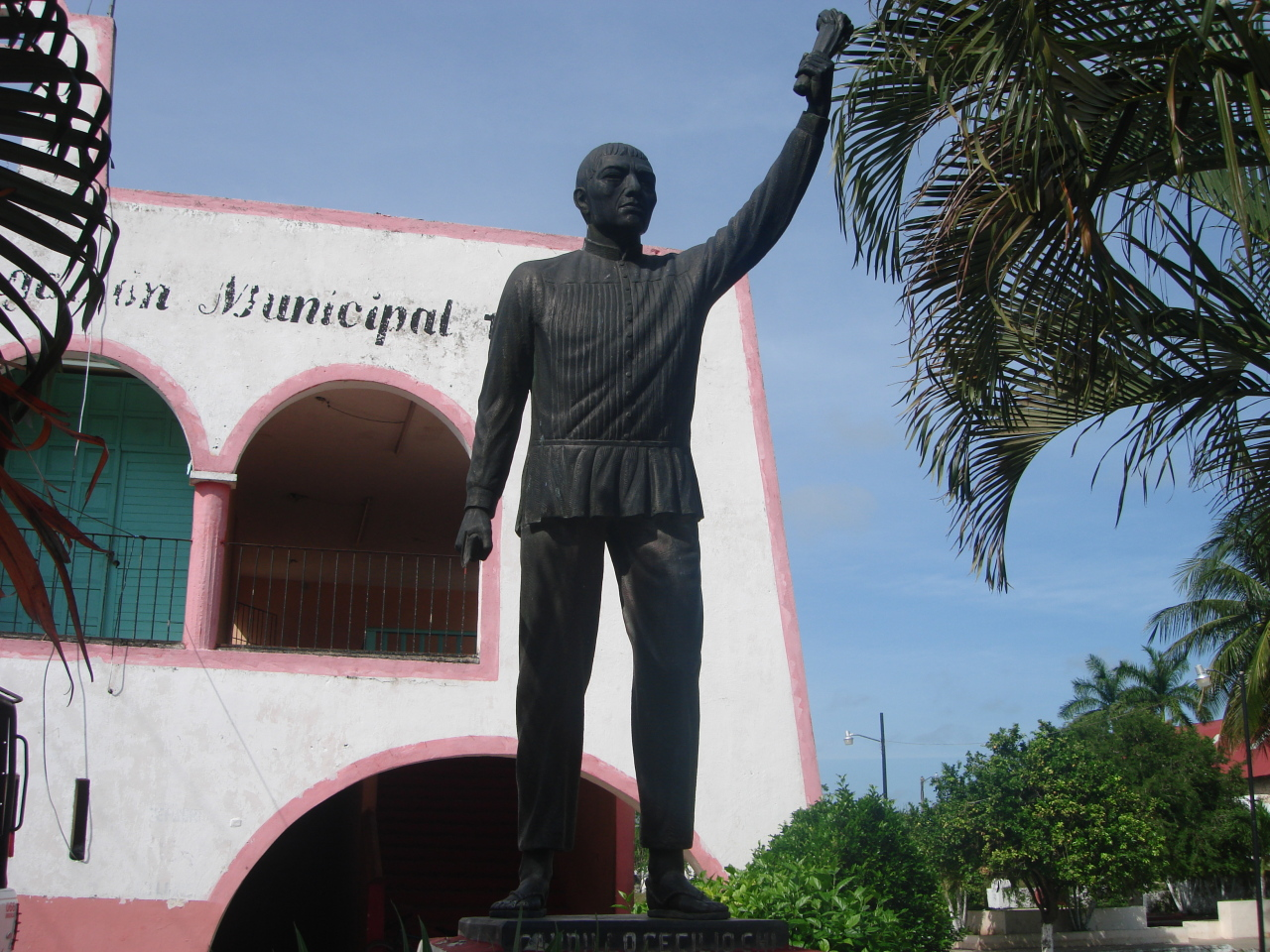
- Statue of Cecilio Chi in Tepich
- Born: c. 1820; Tepich, Yucatán
- Died: December 13, 1848 (28 years old); Chanchen, Yucatán
- Occupation(s): Batab, caudillo

Cecilio Chi (c. 1820 – December 13, 1848) was a Mayan Indigenous batab, born in the town of Tepich, formerly Yucatán, currently Quintana Roo in Mexico. He was a military leader of the Cruzo 'ob (The Caste War Maya).

== Early life ==
Chi owned a rancho in Tepich. In 1842, he participated in the defense of Campeche, which allowed him to learn about military organization. In 1846, he was batab of his native town. He participated in the organization of a rebellion against the Criollos and Ladinos in the region. He coordinated the insurrection with Manuel Antonio Ay, the batab of Chichimilá, and Jacinto Pat, with the purpose of constituting a Mayan nation independent of Mexico, which would respect the rights of the indigenous people.

== The Caste War ==
The rebellion that was called the Caste War began on July 13, 1847, after the execution of Manuel Antonio Ay in Valladolid. The conspiracy was discovered when police found a letter from Cecilio Chi, in which he discussed questions about strategy. The execution of Ay precipitated the start of hostilities when the Yucatán government army entered Tepich looking for his accomplices, burning the houses and severely punishing the Mayan population of the town. Cecilio Chi, who had fled to the hills, returned with his men and attacked the town.

In April 1848, Jacinto Pat signed a peace treaty with the government without consulting Chi. Chi continued fighting and ignored the treaty, essentially invalidating it.

The war would last for more than half a century, until 1901, with the death of all the Mayan leaders. In 1901, the Mexican federal army recovered the last bastion of the Mayan rebels: the town of Chan Santa Cruz. Throughout the struggle that took place, the indigenous leaders and their followers were discredited by the whites, who presented them as bloodthirsty, sadistic, enemies of progress and culture.

== Death ==
Chi and his men hid in the Chanchen forest in late 1848. He died on December 13, 1848. According to some sources, he was assassinated by Atanacio Flores, one of his followers, said to be his secretary. Other sources say that he died in battle.
