= Crescencio Poot =

Crescencio Poot (c. 1820–1885) was a leading general in the Caste War of Yucatán.

== Life as a rebel ==
He began raids on Hispanic-owned haciendas in 1864. In the next several years his troops would raid, but rarely occupy, various villages. This meant generally avoiding government troops, but he did achieve a major victory in the Yucatán. At one point, Bernardino Cen, the commander of the rebel army, killed his two sons in a drunken rage and was temporarily replaced by Poot. Later he became one of the rebellions "three chiefs" and ultimately considered peace with the Mexicans.

He married a woman named Maria D. Aldrete. He was captured during a raid in 1874. His wife, Maria, fearful that the government might use her and her children to coherce her husband, sent her three children away. It is believed her children took her maiden name and fled to Texas or deep into Mexico. In 1878, he was released and began raids again. In 1879, he married a woman he captured in a raid. A few years later, Poot would become the Chan Santa Cruz general in charge of making major decisions and organizing raids and skirmishes.

Negotiations in 1883 led to a treaty signed on January 11, 1884, in Belize City by a Chan Santa Cruz general and the vice-Governor of Yucatán recognizing Mexican sovereignty over Chan Santa Cruz in exchange for Mexican recognition of Chan Santa Cruz leader Crescencio Poot as Governor of the State of Chan Santa Cruz, but the following year there was a coup d'état in Chan Santa Cruz, and the treaty was declared cancelled. Poot was executed in early 1885.
