= Francisco May =

Indigenous Mayan soldier (1884–1969)

Francisco May Pech (1884–1969) was an Indigenous Mayan soldier and commander who served as the last Supreme Commander of the Mayan forces in the Caste War of Yucatán.

== Biography ==
He was born in 1884, in Yokdzonot, in the Mayan Free State, during the Mayan Caste War. One of the commanders of the Mayan forces named Felipe Yam married Pech's Mother and tutored Pech. Pech first became prominent after assaulting a military railway and became leader shortly after the death of Felipe Yam. In 1915, The Governor of Yucatán, Salvador Alvarado, ordered the Garrison Of Chan Santa Cruz to withdraw from the city and hand over military control of the area to Pech. Pech would continuously extract concessions from the Mexican government over the following years, before attempting to retire in the late 1920s but was convinced to remain at a conference organized by the Governor Jose Siurob to obtain Pech's backing and administrative support. He was later expelled from the area in the 1932 and moved to Oxkutzcab, though he would move back to Chan Santa Cruz a few years before his death on March 31, 1969.

== Legacy ==
In Felipe Carrillo Puerto there is a monument in his honor.

On October 30, 2006, his great-grandson Francisco J. Rosado May became rector of the intercultural Maya University of Quintana Roo.
