= Maya peoples =

Indigenous people of Mesoamerica

Maya
- Flag of the Maya people

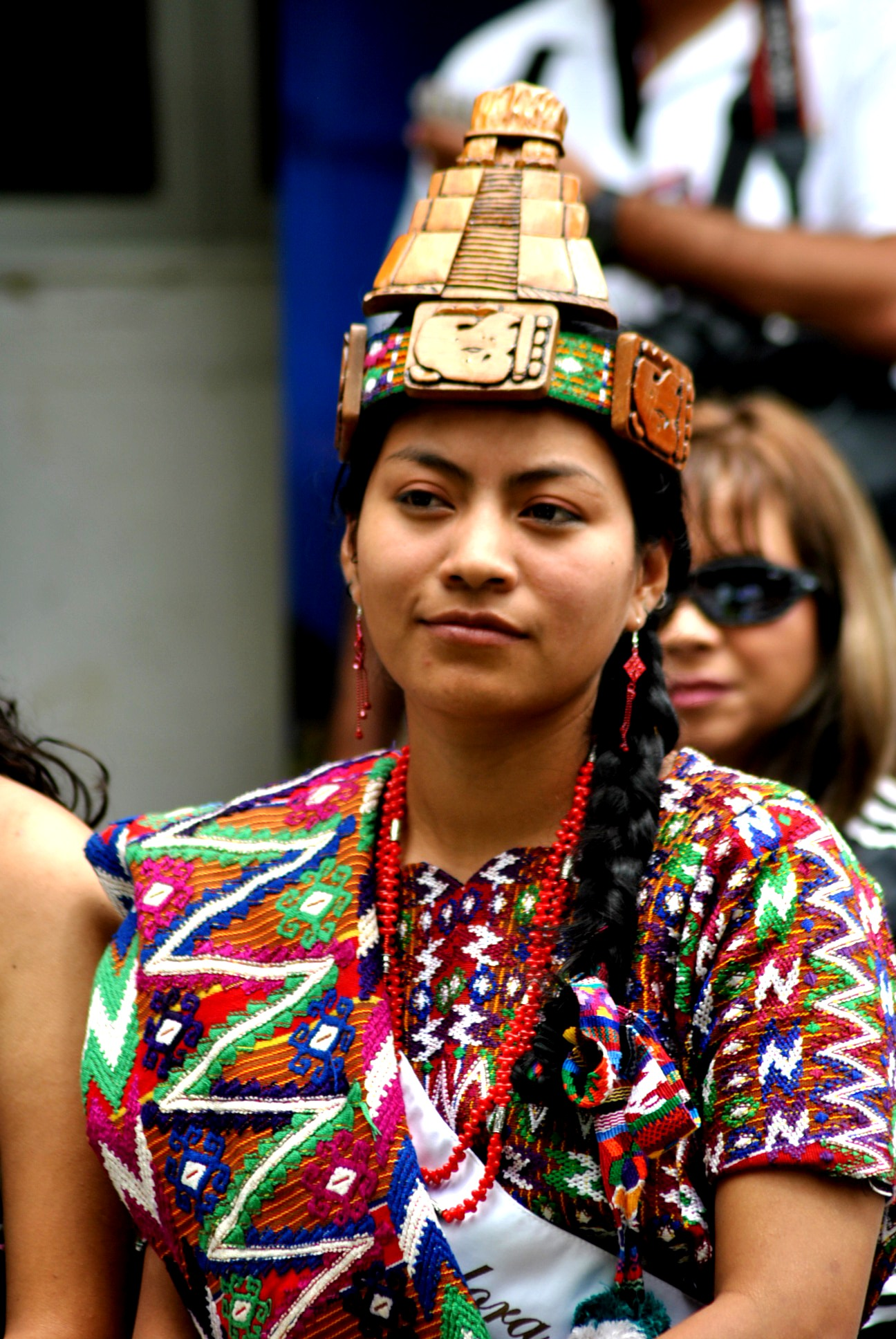
- Maya woman in Guatemala wearing traditional dress

Total population
- c. More than 11 million (2022)

Regions with significant populations
- Parts of modern-day Guatemala, Mexico, United States, Belize, Honduras, and El Salvador
- Guatemala: 7,140,503 (2018)
- Mexico: 3,803,508 (2022)
- United States: 500,000 (2011)
- Honduras: 33,256 (2013)
- Belize: 30,107 (2010)
- El Salvador: 11,000

Languages
- Mayan languages, Spanish, English and Kriol

Religion
- Christianity, Maya religion

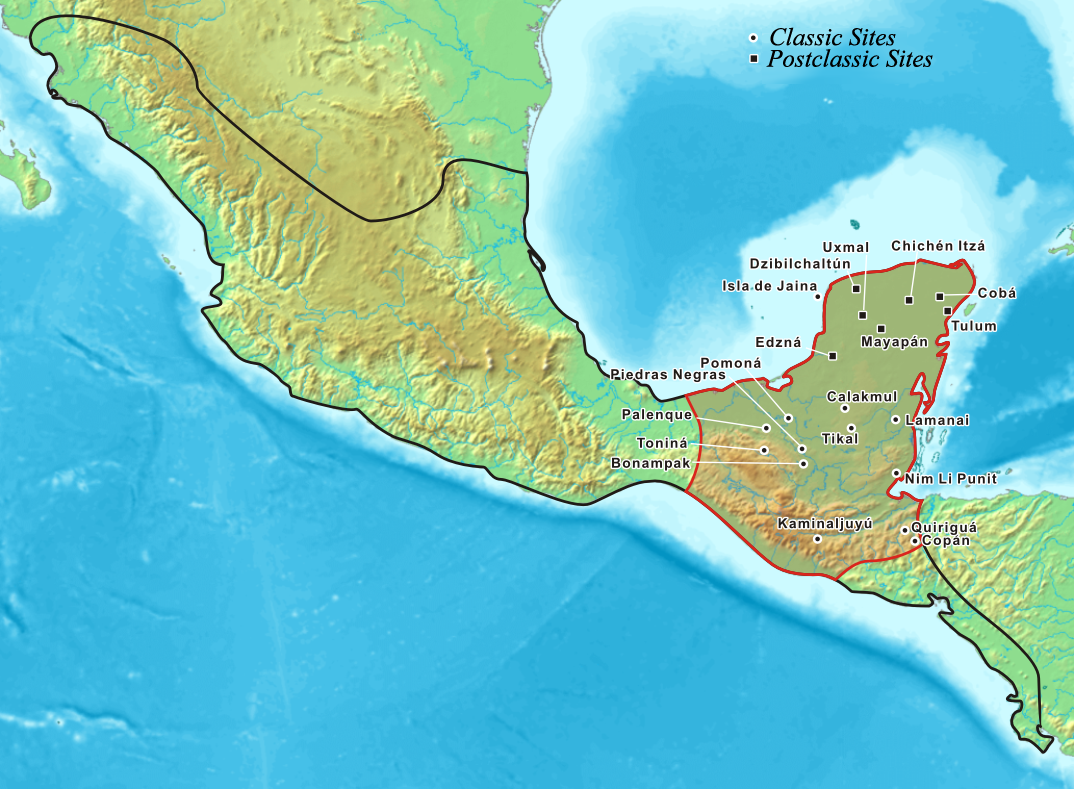
The Maya area within Mesoamerica

Maya (/ˈmaɪə/ MY-ə, Spanish: [ˈmaʝa]) are an ethnolinguistic group of Indigenous peoples in Mesoamerica. Maya peoples are generally descended from the same populations that inhabited the region during the ancient Maya civilization. Today, they primarily live in Guatemala, southeast Mexico, Belize, and westernmost El Salvador and Honduras.

The term "Maya" is a modern collective term for the peoples of the region; the term was not historically used by the Indigenous populations themselves. There was no common sense of identity or political unity among the distinct populations, societies and ethnic groups because they each had their own particular traditions, cultures and historical identity.

It is estimated that seven million Maya were living in this area at the start of the 21st century. Guatemala, southern Mexico and the Yucatán Peninsula, Belize, El Salvador, and western Honduras, have managed to maintain numerous remnants of their ancient cultural heritage. Some are quite integrated into the majority westernised mestizo cultures of the nations in which they reside, while others continue a more traditional, culturally distinct life, often speaking one of the Mayan languages as a primary language.

== Mexico ==
=== Yucatan Peninsula ===
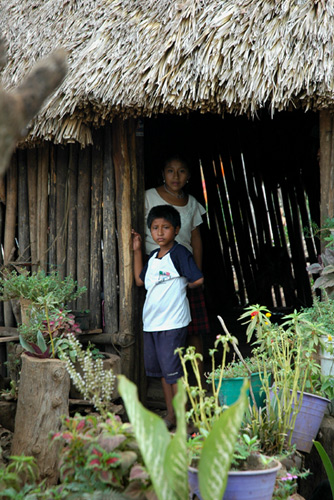
Yucatec Maya mother and child, 2006

One of the largest groups of Maya, the Yucatec Maya people, live in the Yucatan Peninsula, which includes the Mexican states of Yucatán State, Campeche, and Quintana Roo as well as the nation of Belize. These people identify themselves as "Maya" with no further ethnic subdivision (unlike in the Highlands of Western Guatemala). They speak the language which anthropologists term "Yucatec Maya", but is identified by speakers and Yucatecos simply as "Maya". Among Maya speakers, Spanish is commonly spoken as a second or first language.

There is a significant amount of confusion as to the correct terminology to use – Maya or Mayan – the meaning of these words with reference to contemporary and pre-Columbian peoples, to Mayas in different parts of Mexico, Guatemala and Belize, and tol language+3s or peoples.

oxlahun ahau u katunil u 13 he›cob cah mayapan: maya uinic u kabaob: uaxac ahau paxci u cabobi: ca uecchahi ti peten tulacal: uac katuni paxciob ca haui u maya-bulub ahau u kaba u katunil hauci u maya kabaob maya uinicob: christiano u kabaob
"Ahau was the katun when they founded the cah of Mayapan; they were [thus] called Maya men. In 8 Ahau their lands were destroyed and they were scattered throughout the peninsula. Six katun after they were destroyed they ceased to be called Maya; 11 Ahau was the name of the katun when the Maya men ceased to be called Maya [and] were called Christians."

— Chilam Balam Chumayel

Linguists refer to the Maya language as Yucatec or Yucatec Maya to distinguish it from other Mayan languages. This norm has often been misinterpreted to mean that the people are also called Yucatec Maya; that term refers to only the language, and the correct name for the people is simply Maya (not Mayans). (Yucatec) Maya is one language in the Mayan language family. Confusion of the term Maya/Mayan as an ethnic label occurs because Maya women who use traditional dress identify by the ethnic term mestiza and not Maya.

Persons use a strategy of ethnic identification that Juan Castillo Cocom refers to as "ethnoexodus"—meaning that ethnic self-identification as Maya is quite variable, situational, and articulated not to processes of producing group identity, but of escaping from discriminatory processes of sociocultural marginalization.

The Yucatán's Indigenous population was first exposed to Europeans after a party of Spanish shipwreck survivors came ashore in 1511. One of the sailors, Gonzalo Guerrero, is reported to have taken up with a local woman and started a family; he became a war captain in the Postclassic Mayan state of Chetumal. Later Spanish expeditions to the region were led by Córdoba in 1517, Grijalva in 1518, and Cortés in 1519. From 1528 to 1540, several attempts by Francisco Montejo to conquer the Yucatán failed. His son, Francisco de Montejo the Younger, fared almost as badly when he first took over: while invading Chichen Itza, he lost 150 men in a single day. European diseases, massive recruitment of native warriors from Campeche and Champoton, and internal hatred between the Xiu Maya and the lords of Cocom eventually turned the tide for Montejo the Younger. Chichen Itza was conquered by 1570. In 1542, the western Yucatán Peninsula also surrendered to him.

Chichen Itza's El Castillo

Historically, the population in the eastern half of the peninsula was less affected by and less integrated than the western half. In the 21st century in the Yucatán Peninsula (Mexican states of Campeche, Yucatán and Quintana Roo), has between 750,000 and 1,200,000 people speaking Mayan. However, three times more than that are of Maya origins, hold ancient Maya surnames, and do not speak Mayan languages as their first language.

Matthew Restall, in his book The Maya Conquistador, mentions a series of letters sent to the King of Spain in the 16th and 17th centuries. The noble Maya families at that time signed documents to the Spanish royal family; surnames mentioned in those letters are Pech, Camal, Xiu, Ucan, Canul, Cocom, and Tun, among others.

A large 19th-century revolt by the Maya people of Yucatán in Mexico, known as the Caste War of Yucatán, was one of the most successful modern Indigenous revolts in Mexico. For a period the Maya state of Chan Santa Cruz was recognized as an independent nation by the British Empire, particularly in terms of trading with British Honduras.

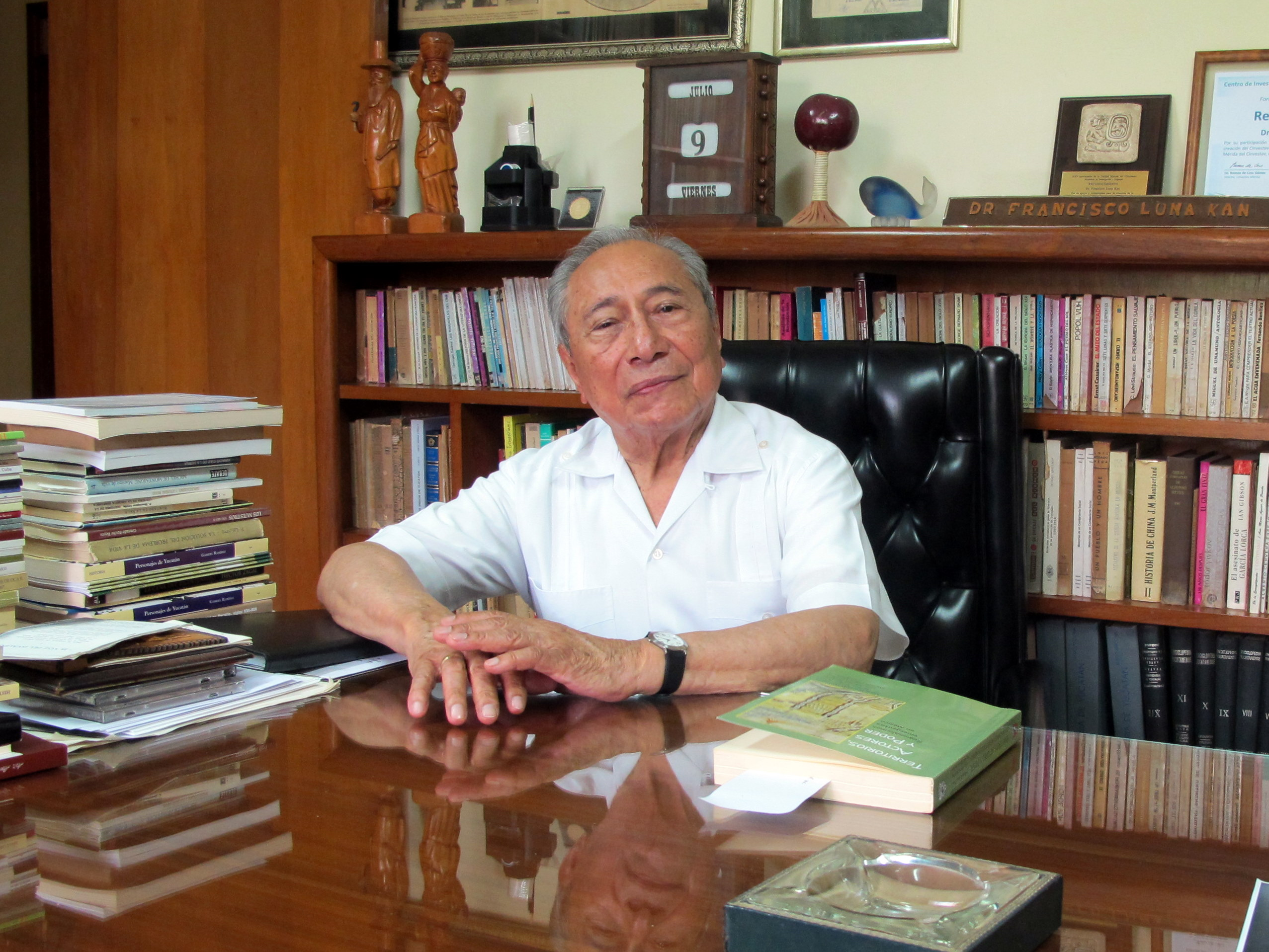
Former governor of Yucatán, Francisco Luna Kan, was a Maya with the very common surname "Kan"

Francisco Luna-Kan was elected governor of the state of Yucatán from 1976 to 1982. Luna-Kan was born in Mérida, Yucatán, and he was a doctor of medicine, then a professor of medicine before his political offices. He was first appointed as overseer of the state's rural medical system. He was the first governor of the modern Yucatán Peninsula to be of full Maya ancestry. In the early 21st century, dozens of politicians, including deputies, mayors and senators, are of full or mixed Maya heritage from the Yucatán Peninsula.

According to the National Institute of Geography and Informatics (Mexico's INEGI), in Yucatán State there were 1.2 million Mayan speakers in 2009, representing just under 60% of the inhabitants. Due to this, the cultural section of the government of Yucatán began on-line classes for grammar and proper pronunciation of Maya.

Maya people from Yucatán Peninsula living in the United States of America have been organizing Maya language lessons and Maya cooking classes since 2003 in California and other states: clubs of Yucatec Maya are registered in Dallas and Irving, Texas; Salt Lake City in Utah; Las Vegas, Nevada; and California, with groups in San Francisco; San Rafael; Chino; Pasadena; Santa Ana; Garden Grove; Inglewood; Los Angeles; Thousand Oaks; Oxnard; San Fernando Valley and Whittier. Maya language is taught at the college and graduate level; beginning, intermediate, and advanced courses in Maya have been taught at Indiana University since 2010. The Open School of Ethnography and Anthropology offers immersion Maya courses in a six-week intensive summer program.

=== Chiapas ===
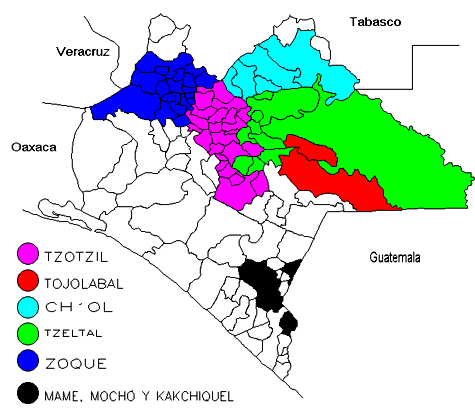
Maya populations in Chiapas. The area officially assigned to the Lacandon Community is the Montes Azules Biosphere Reserve, which partly overlaps with the Tzeltal, Tojolabal and Chʼol areas. Note. The Zoque are not Maya.

Chiapas was for many years one of the regions of Mexico that was least touched by the reforms of the Mexican Revolution. The Zapatista Army of National Liberation, launched a rebellion against the Mexican state, Chiapas in January 1994, declared itself to be an Indigenous movement and drew its strongest and earliest support from Chiapan Maya. Today its number of supporters is relevant. (see also the EZLN and the Chiapas conflict)

Maya groups in Chiapas include the Tzotzil and Tzeltal, in the highlands of the state, the Tojolabalis concentrated in the lowlands around Las Margaritas, the Chʼol in the jungle, and in the south eastern uplands, the endangered Mochó and the Kaqchikel, also widely spoken in the Guatemalan highlands (see map: note the Zoque are not Maya).

The most traditional of Maya groups are the Lacandon, a small population avoiding contact with outsiders until the late 20th century by living in small groups in the Lacandon Jungle. These Lacandon Maya came from the Campeche/Petén area (north-east of Chiapas) and moved into the Lacandon rain-forest at the end of the 18th century.

In the course of the 20th century, and increasingly in the 1950s and 1960s, other people (mainly the Maya and subsistence peasants from the highlands), also entered into the Lacandon region; initially encouraged by the government. This immigration led to land-related conflicts and an increasing pressure on the rainforest. To halt the migration, the government decided in 1971 to declare a large part of the forest (614,000 hectares, or 6140 km^{2}) a protected area: the Montes Azules Biosphere Reserve. They appointed only one small population group (the 66 Lacandon families) as tenants (thus creating the Lacandon Community), thereby displacing 2000 Tzeltal and Chʼol families from 26 communities, and leaving non-Lacandon communities dependent on the government for granting their rights to land. In the decades that followed the government carried out numerous programs to keep the problems in the region under control, using land distribution as a political tool; as a way of ensuring loyalty from different campesino groups. This strategy of divide and rule led to great disaffection and tensions among population groups in the region.
(see also the Chiapas conflict and the Lacandon Jungle).

=== Tabasco ===
The state of Tabasco is home to the Chontal Maya. Tabasco is located in southern Mexico, in between Campeche, Chiapas, and Veracruz, with its northern coastline bordering the Gulf of Mexico. In its capital, Villahermosa, Parque Museo la Venta is known for its zoo and colossal stone sculptures dating to the Olmec civilization. The grand Museo de Historia de Tabasco chronicles the area from prehistoric times, while the Museo Regional de Antropología has exhibits on the native Tabasco Maya and Olmec culture.

== Guatemala ==
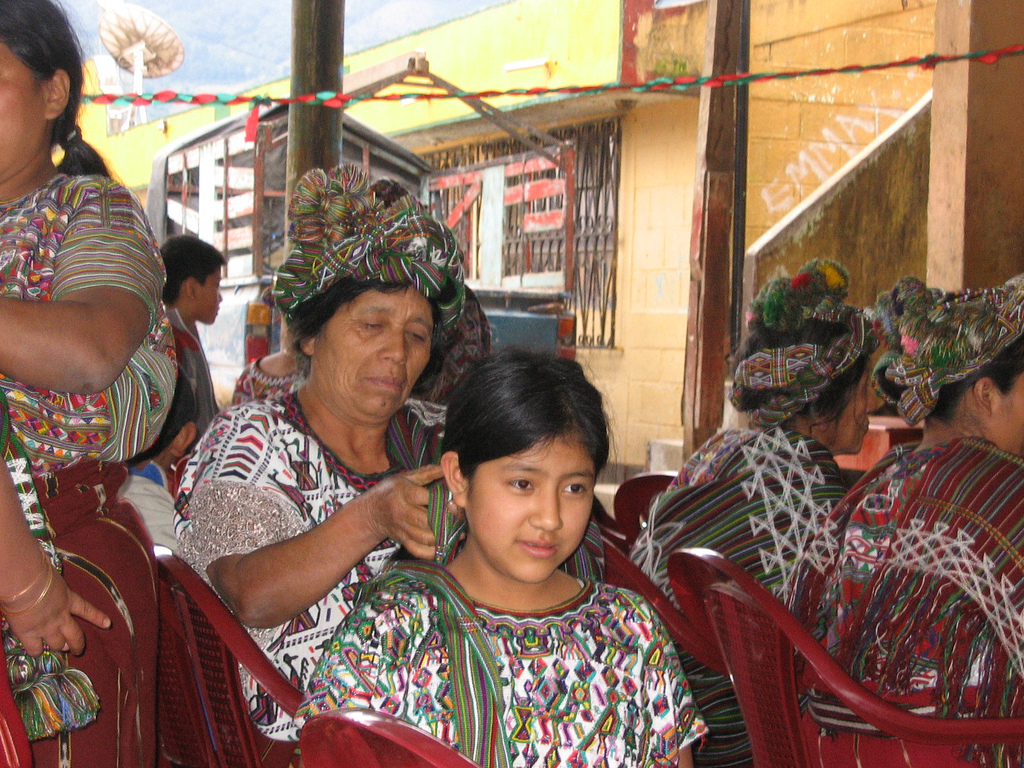
Indigenous Ixil woman and girl, 2007

In Guatemala, Indigenous people of Maya descent comprise around 42% of the population. Many Maya still experience discrimination and oppression. The largest Maya populations are found in the western highlands where they make up the majority of populations in the departments of Baja Verapaz, Quiché, Totonicapán, Huehuetenango, Quetzaltenango, and San Marcos.

The Maya people of the Guatemalan highlands include the Achi, Akatek, Chuj, Ixil, Jakaltek, Kaqchikel, Kʼicheʼ, Mam, Poqomam, Poqomchiʼ, Qʼanjobʼal, Qʼeqchiʼ, Tzʼutujil and Uspantek.

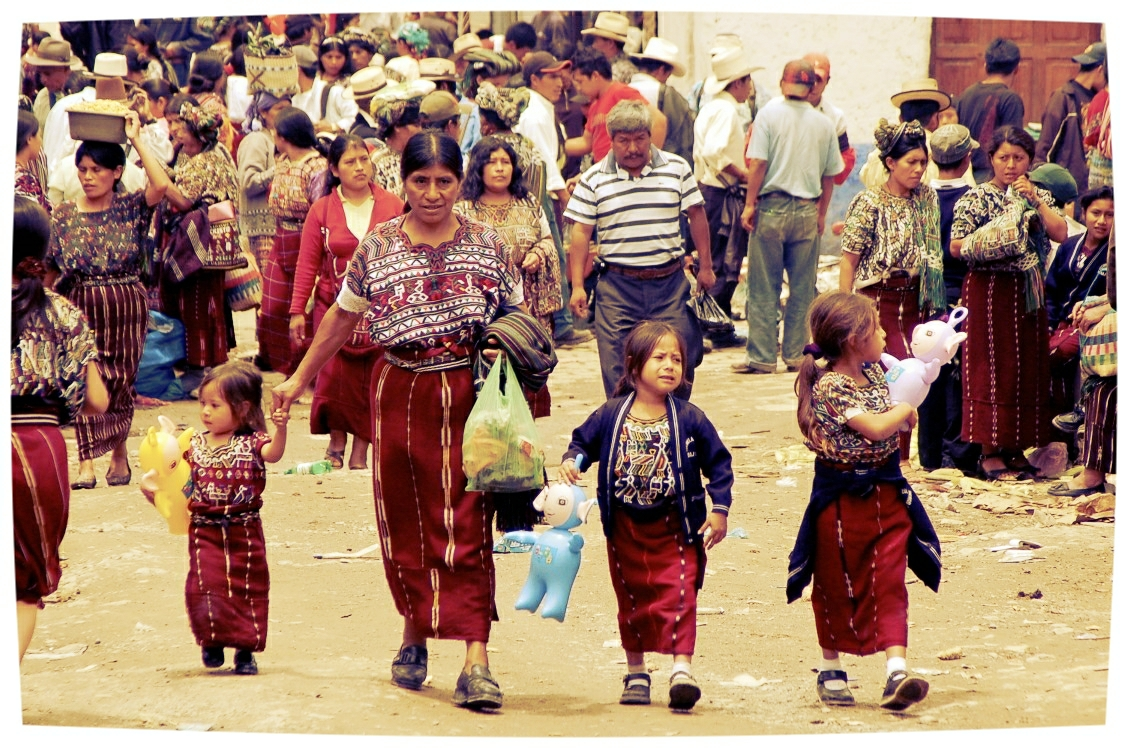
Mayans in Guatemala

The Qʼeqchiʼ live in the lowland areas of Alta Verapaz, Petén, and western Belize. Over the course of centuries, a series of land displacements, re-settlements, persecutions, and migrations resulted in a wider dispersal of Qʼeqchiʼ communities into other regions of Guatemala (Izabal, Petén, El Quiché). They are the second-largest ethnic Maya group in Guatemala (after the Kʼicheʼ) and one of the largest and most widespread throughout Central America.

Map of regional Indigenous languages in Guatemala

In Guatemala, the Spanish practice of keeping the native population legally separate and subservient to Ladinos and whites continued until well into the 20th century. As a result, many traditional customs were preserved among the Maya. Furthermore, the racial discrimination and views of the time meant they would have to start at the bottom of the social ladder compared to others. Because of this, many Guatemalan Maya, especially women, continue to wear traditional clothing which may vary according to their local identity.

The southeastern region of Guatemala (bordering with Honduras) includes groups such as the Chʼortiʼ. The northern lowland Petén region includes the Itza, whose language is near extinction but whose agroforestry practices, including use of dietary and medicinal plants may still tell us much about pre-colonial management of the Maya lowlands.

=== History ===
The Classic period of Mesoamerican civilization corresponds to the height of the Maya civilization. It is represented by countless sites throughout Guatemala, although the largest concentration is in Petén. This period is characterized by urbanisation, the emergence of independent city-states, and contact with other Mesoamerican cultures.

Mayanists and other scholars estimate that the Terminal Classic period (c. 800–900 AD) is when the Maya civilization reached its peak population and highest level of flourishing in the lowlands region. This lasted until approximately 900 AD, when the Classic Maya civilization collapsed. They abandoned many of the big cities in the central lowlands such as Tikal, Palenque, and El Mirador, and many were killed through constant warfare and a drought-induced famine.

=== Genocide ===
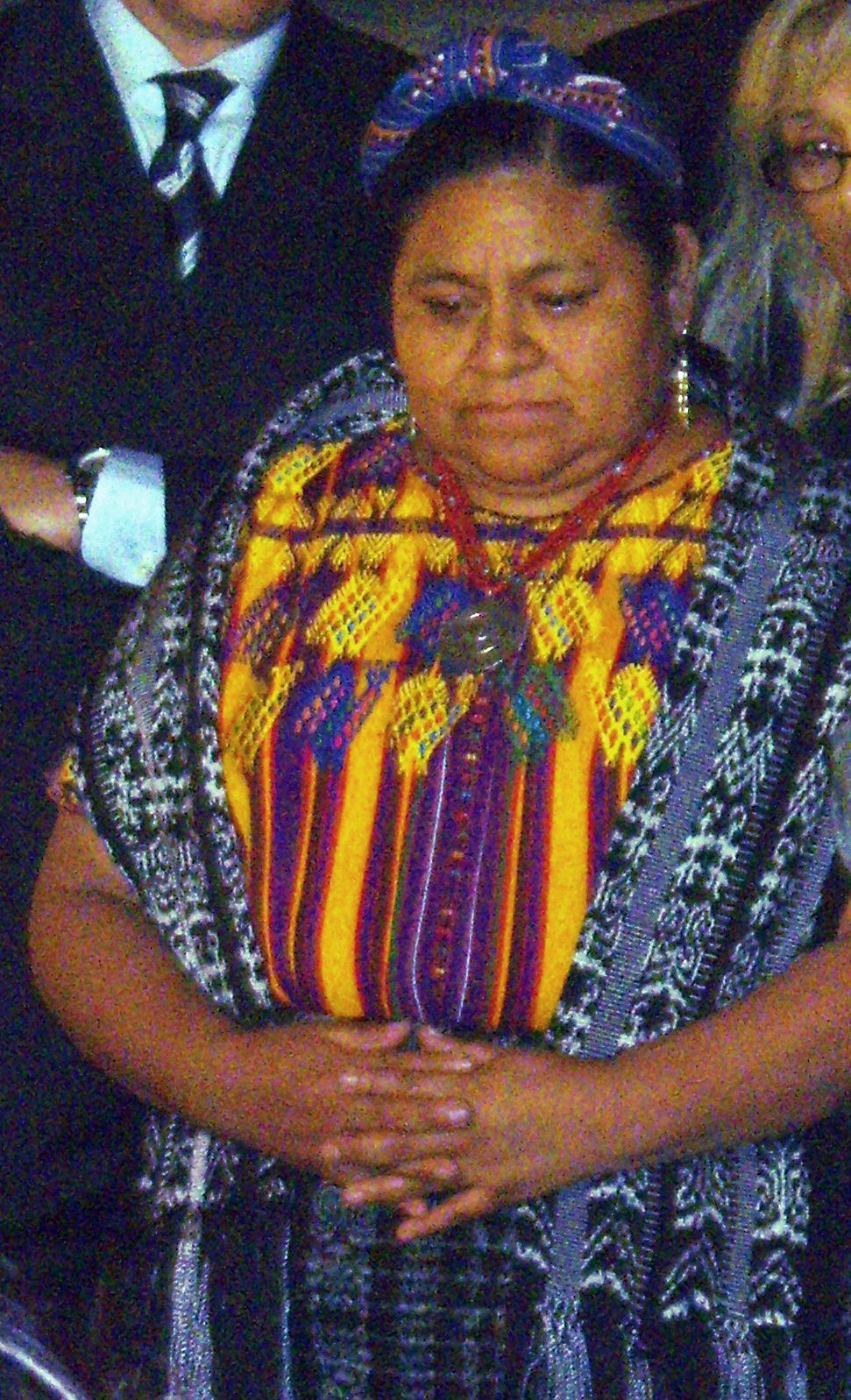
Human rights activist and Nobel Peace Prize laureate Rigoberta Menchú Tum in Acaya, Province of Lecce (Italy), at the opening press conference of the International Forum of Peace.

The 36-year-long Guatemalan Civil War from 1960 to 1996 left more than 200,000 people dead, a half-million people driven from their homes, and at least 100,000 women raped; most of the victims were Maya.

The genocide against Mayan people took place throughout the whole civil war because Indigenous people were seen as supporting the leftist guerillas, but most acts against humanity occurred during Efraín Ríos Montt's presidency (1982–1983). Ríos Montt instituted a campaign of state terror intended to destroy the Mayas in the name of countering "communist subversion" and ridding the country of its Indigenous culture. This was also known as Operation Sofia. Within Operation Sofia, the military followed through with "scorched earth policies" which allowed them to destroy whole villages, including killing livestock, destroying cultural symbols, destroying crops, and murdering civilians. In some areas, government forces killed about 40% of the total population; the campaign destroyed at least 626 Mayan villages.

On January 26, 2012, former president Ríos Montt was formally indicted in Guatemala for overseeing the massacre of 1,771 civilians of the Ixil Maya group and appeared in court for genocide and crimes against humanity for which he was then sentenced to 80 years in prison on May 10, 2013. This ruling was overturned by the constitutional court on May 20, 2013, over alleged irregularities in the handling of the case. The ex-president appeared in court again on January 5, 2015, amongst protest from his lawyers regarding his health conditions and on August 25, 2015, it was deliberated that a re-trial of the 2013 proceedings could find Ríos Montt guilty or not, but that the sentence would be suspended. Ríos Montt died on April 1, 2018, of a heart attack.

=== Maya heritage ===
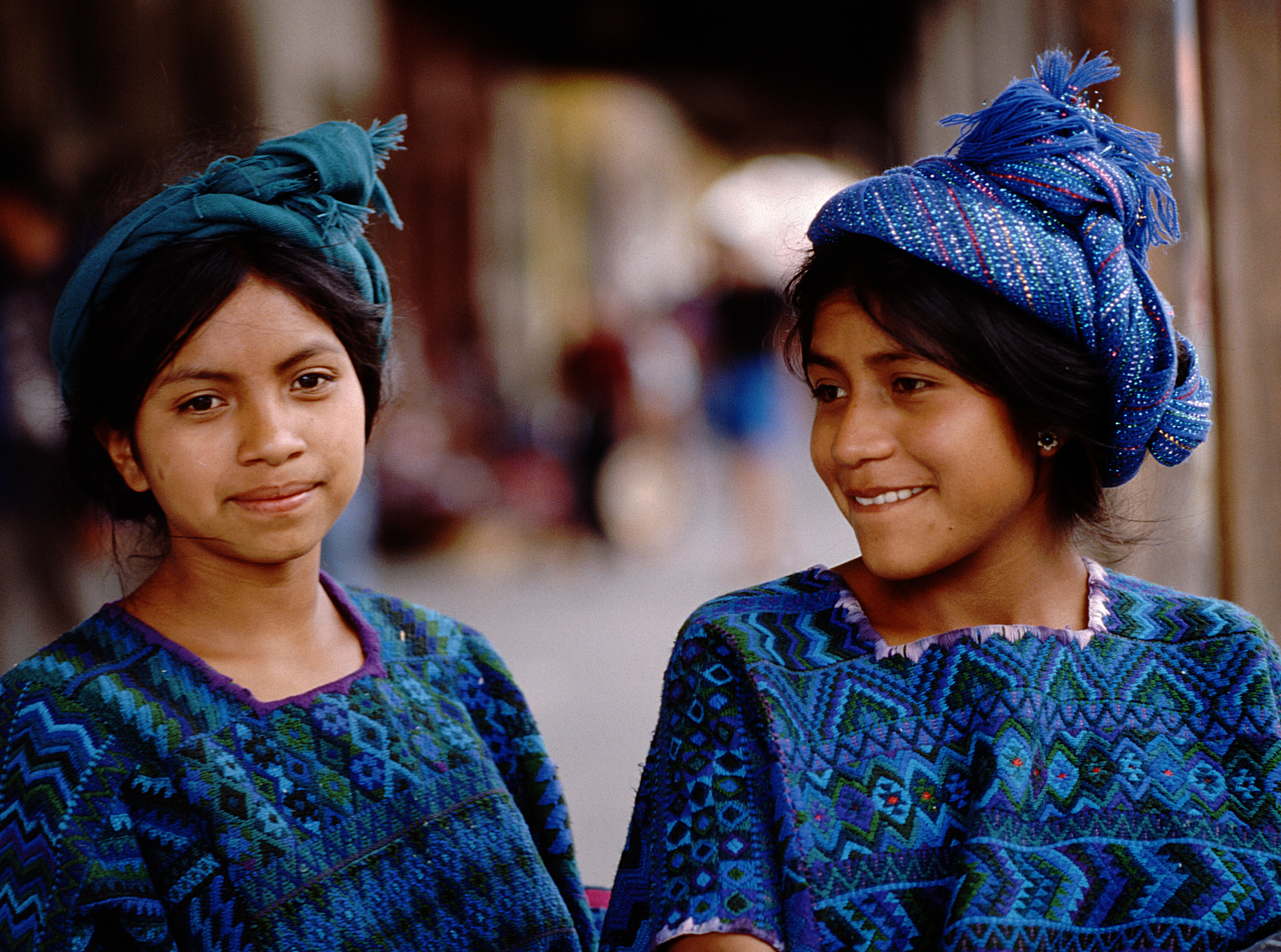
Guatemalan girls in their traditional clothing from the town of Santa Catarina Palopó on Lake Atitlán

The Maya people are known for their brightly colored, yarn-based, textiles that are woven into capes, shirts, blouses, huipiles and dresses. Each village has its own distinctive pattern, making it possible to distinguish a person's home town. Women's clothing consists of a shirt and a long skirt.

The Maya religion is Roman Catholicism combined with the Indigenous Maya religion to form the unique syncretic religion which prevailed throughout the country and still does in the rural regions. Beginning from negligible roots prior to 1960, however, Protestant Pentecostalism has grown to become the predominant religion of Guatemala City and other urban centers, and mid-sized towns. The unique religion is reflected in the local saint, Maximón, who is associated with the subterranean force of masculine fertility and prostitution. Always depicted in black, he wears a black hat and sits on a chair, often with a cigar placed in his mouth and a gun in his hand, with offerings of tobacco, alcohol, and Coca-Cola at his feet. The locals know him as San Simon of Guatemala.

Maximón, a Maya deity

The Popol Vuh is the most significant work of Guatemalan literature in the Kʼicheʼ language, and one of the most important works of Pre-Columbian American literature. It is a compendium of Maya stories and legends, aimed to preserve Maya traditions. The first known version of this text dates from the 16th century and is written in Quiché transcribed in Latin characters. It was translated into Spanish by the Dominican priest Francisco Ximénez in the beginning of the 18th century. Due to its combination of historical, mythical, and religious elements, it has been called the Maya Bible. It is a vital document for understanding the culture of Pre-Columbian America. The Rabinal Achí is a dramatic work consisting of dance and text that is preserved as it was originally represented. It is thought to date from the 15th century and narrates the mythical and dynastic origins of the Toj Kʼicheʼ rulers of Rabinal, and their relationships with neighboring Kʼicheʼ of Qʼumarkaj. The Rabinal Achí is performed during the Rabinal festival of January 25, the day of Saint Paul. It was declared a masterpiece of oral tradition of humanity by UNESCO in 2005. The 16th century saw the first native-born Guatemalan writers that wrote in Spanish.

== Belize ==
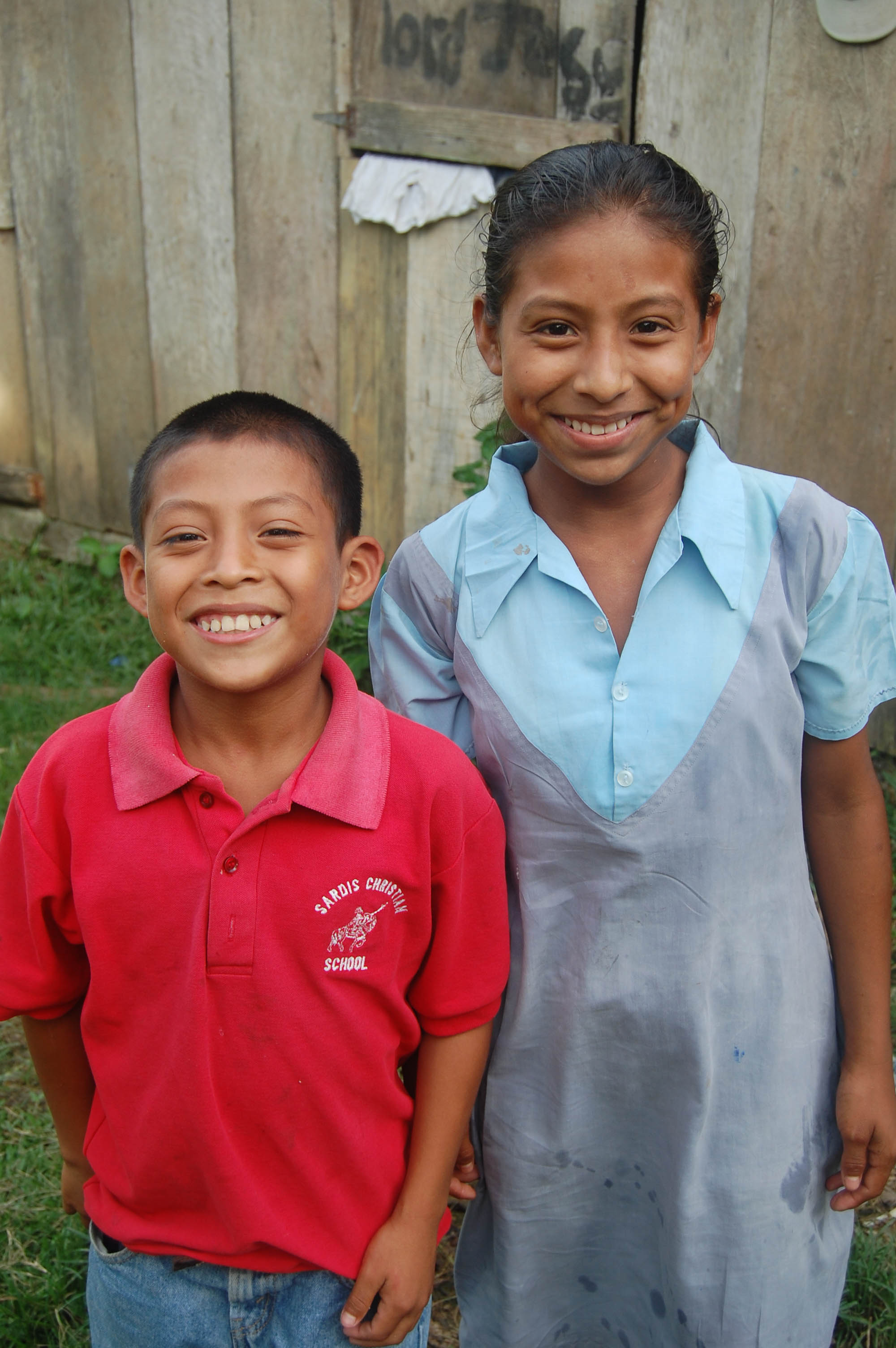
Maya kids in Belize

The Maya population in Belize was estimated to be at 11.3% in 2010, making them a significant minority in the country. They are concentrated in the Corozal, Cayo, Toledo and Orange Walk districts, but are scattered throughout the country too. The Maya are thought to have been in Belize and the Yucatán region since the second millennium BC. Much of Belize's original Maya population died as a result of new infectious diseases and conflicts between tribes and with Europeans. Today, the Indigenous population of Belize is divided into three main groups: the Yucatec, Kekchi, and Mopan – all are Maya.

The Yucatec Maya live in Northern Belize. Many of them migrated from the Yucatán in Mexico to escape the Caste War from 1847 to 1901. Several Yucatec Maya groups lived near the Yalbac area of Belize and in the Orange Walk district near the present-day Lamanai at the time of British contact. The Mopan are Indigenous to Belize but were forced out by the British; they returned from Guatemala to evade slavery in the 19th century. The Kekchi also fled from slavery in Guatemala in the 19th century. The latter groups are chiefly found in the Toledo District.

== List of largest Maya groups ==
The ethnic groups of the Maya are found throughout the Maya Region. The Southern Maya area is one of the main regions and corresponds to the Guatemalan highlands. It includes some of the larger groups such as the K'iche', Kaqchikel, and Mam. A list of Mayan ethnic groups is below.

List of largest Maya groups
Ethnic group	Population	Language	Country	Subregion	Year
K'iche'	1,680,551	K'iche'	Guatemala	Quiché, Totonicapán	2018
Yucatec Mayas	1,646,782	Yucatec Maya	Mexico	Yucatán Peninsula	2020
Q'eqchi'	1,370,007	Q'eqchi'	Guatemala	Alta Verapaz, Petén, Izabal	2018
Kaqchikel	1,068,356	Kaqchikel	Guatemala	Guatemala, Chimaltenango	2018
Mam	865,884	Mam	Guatemala, Mexico	Huehuetenango, Quetzaltenango, San Marcos	2018
Tzeltal	747,637	Tzeltal	Mexico	Chiapas and southern Tabasco	2020
Tzotzil	696,319	Tzotzil	Mexico	Chiapas	2020
Ch'ol	338,413	Ch'ol	Mexico	Northern Chiapas	2020
Huastec	255,190	Huastec	Mexico	La Huasteca	2020
Q'anjob'al	226,675	Q'anjob'al	Guatemala	Huehuetenango	2020
Poqomchi	176,622	Poqomchi'	Guatemala	Alta Verapaz	2018
Achi	160,858	Achi	Guatemala	Baja Verapaz	2018
Ch'orti'	157,000	Ch'orti'	Guatemala, Honduras	Chiquimula, Copán	2018
Ixil	133,569	Ixil	Guatemala	Ixil Triangle	2018
Chontal Maya	109,456	Chontal Mayan	Mexico	Tabasco, Oaxaca	2020
Tz'utujil	106,000	Tz'utujil	Guatemala	Sololá, Suchitepéquez	2018
Chuj	97,028	Chuj	Guatemala	Northern Huehuetenango	2018
Tojolabal	89,883	Tojolab'al	Mexico	Chiapas	2020
Akatek	65,965	Akatek	Guatemala	San Miguel Acatán	2018
Jakaltek	54,237	Jakaltek	Guatemala	Jacaltenango	2018
Poqomam	46,478	Poqomam	Guatemala	Jalapa, Escuintla	2018
Chalchiteco	33,641	Chalchitek	Guatemala	Aguacatán	2018
Sipakapenses	17,373	Sipakapense	Guatemala	Sipacapa	2018
Mopans	13,917	Mopan	Belize, Guatemala	Toledo District, Petén	2010
Sakapultek	12,938	Sakapultek	Guatemala	Sacapulas	2018
Aguacateco	12,541	Awakatek	Guatemala	Aguacatán	2018
Other Guatemala	11,152				2018
Total	10,194,472				

== Maya cultural heritage tourism ==
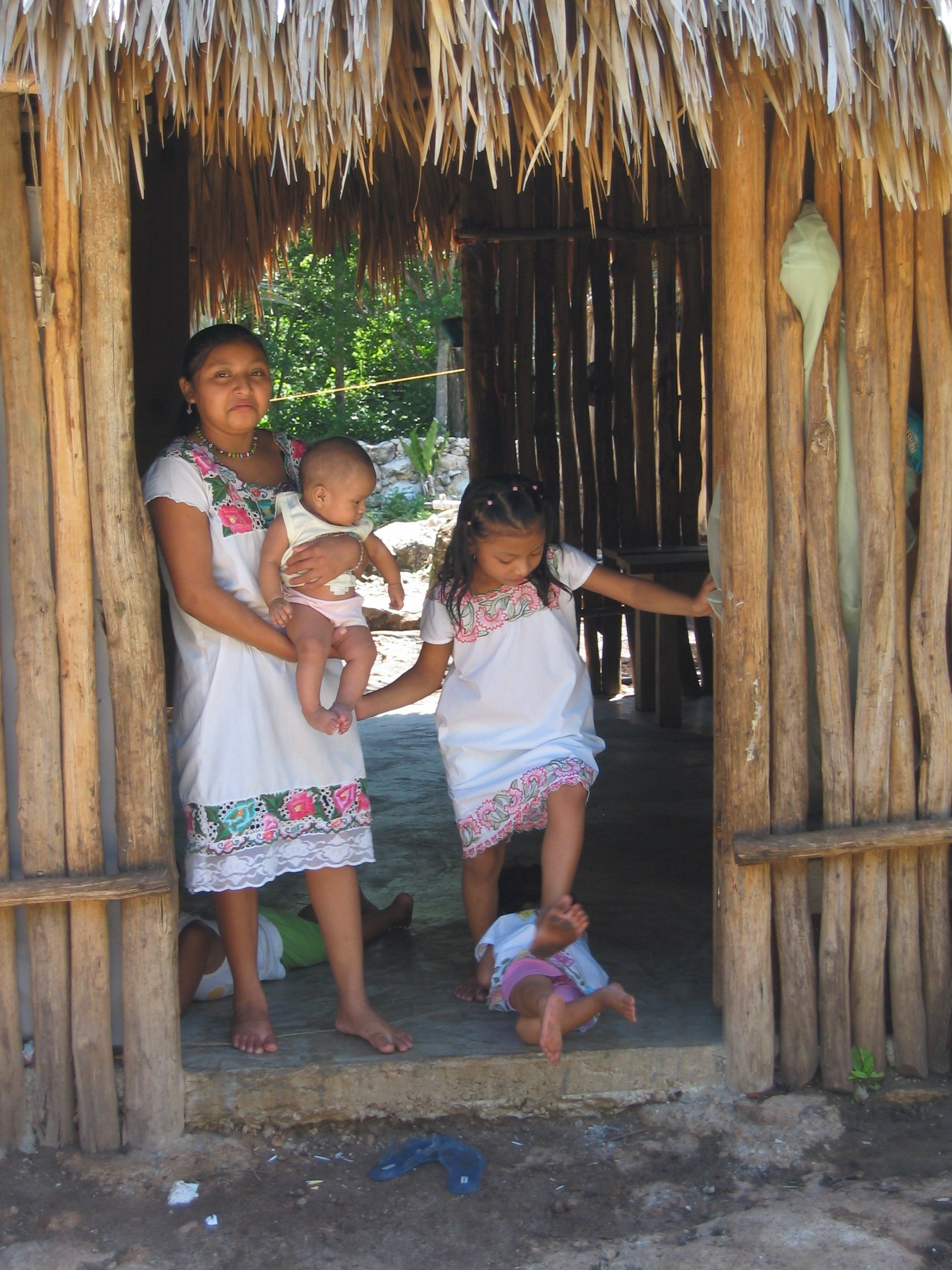
Maya family from Yucatán

A boy playing Maya trumpet opposite of Palacio Nacional, Mexico City, Mexico.

There is often a relationship between cultural heritage, tourism, and a national identity. In the case of the Maya, the many national identities have been constructed because of the growing demands placed on them by cultural tourism. By focusing on lifeways through costumes, rituals, diet, handicrafts, language, housing, or other features, the identity of the economy shifts from the sale of labor to that of the sale of culture.

Global tourism is now considered one of the largest scale movement of goods, services, and people in history and a significant catalyst for economic development and sociopolitical change. Estimated that between 35 and 40 per cent of tourism today is represented by cultural tourism or heritage tourism, this alternative to mass tourism offers opportunities for place-based engagement that frames context for interaction by the lived space and everyday life of other peoples, as well as sites and objects of global historical significance. In this production of tourism the use of historic symbols, signs, and topics form a new side that characterizes a nation and can play an active role in nation building.

With this type of tourism, people argue that ethno-commerce may open unprecedented opportunities for creating value of various kinds. Tourists travel with cultural expectations, which has created a touristic experience sometimes faced with the need to invent traditions of artificial and contrived attractions, often developed at the expense of local tradition and meanings.

An example of this can be seen in "Mayanizing Tourism on Roatan Island, Honduras: Archaeological Perspectives on Heritage, Development, and Indignity." Alejandro J. Figueroa et al., combine archaeological data and ethnographic insights to explore a highly contested tourism economy in their discussion of how places on Roatan Island, Honduras, have become increasingly "Mayanized" over the past decade. As tour operators and developers continue to invent an idealized Maya past for the island, non-Maya archaeological remains and cultural patrimony are constantly being threatened and destroyed. While heritage tourism provides economic opportunities for some, it can devalue contributions made by less familiar groups.

== Notable Maya people ==
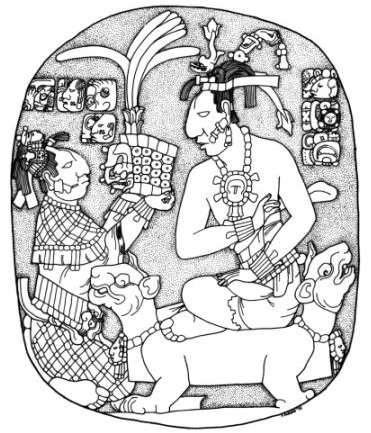
Lady Sak Kʼukʼ presenting a crown to her son Kʼinich Janaabʼ Pakal, on the day he assumed the kingship

- Sak Tahn Waax, ancient Mayan astronomer-mathematician whose name appears next to a calendaric formula found on one of the inner walls of a structure found in Xultún, Guatemala.
- Ah Ahaual, a 7th-century captive of noble lineage recorded in pre-Columbian Maya inscriptions
- Hunac Ceel (fl. c. 1300), Maya general and founder of the Cocom dynasty at Chichen Itzá
- Apoxpalon (fl. 1525), Maya merchant and regional ruler of Itzamkanac
- Tecun Uman (died c. 1524), legendary Kʼicheʼ Mayan leader who refused to give way to the conquistadors in Guatemala and was slain by Pedro de Alvarado
- Napuc Chi or Ah Kin Chi (died c. 1541), general-in-chief of the army and king of Tutul-Xiu, i. e. Maní
- Gaspar Antonio Chi (c. 1531–1610), Maya noble from Maní, son of Napuc Chi
- Jacinto Canek (c. 1731–1761), Maya revolutionary
- Crescencio Poot (1820–1885), general in the Caste War of Yucatán
- Felipe Carrillo Puerto (1874–1924), Mexican journalist and politician, governor of the Mexican state of Yucatán (1922–1924)
- Paula Nicho Cumez (born 1955), is a Mayan-Guatemalan artist. Cumez is inspired by Mayan tradition and culture and focuses on expressing the context of native women's experience in her artwork; additionally, Cumez is inspired by the Popol Vuh
- Andrés Curruchich (1891–1969), Guatemalan painter of the Kaqchikel people
- Carlos Mérida (1891–1985), Spanish-Kʼicheʼ artist from Guatemala
- Francisco Luna Kan (1925–2023), Mexican politician, governor of Yucatán (1976–1982)
- Armando Manzanero Canché (1935–2020), Mexican musician, singer, and composer
- Luis Rolando Ixquiac Xicara (born 1947), Indigenous artist born in Quetzaltenango, Guatemala
- Marcial Mes (c. 1949–2014), Belizean politician
- Rosalina Tuyuc (born 1956), Guatemalan human rights activist
- Rigoberta Menchú (born 1959), Kʼicheʼ political activist from Guatemala
- Comandanta Ramona (1959–2006), 'officer' of the autonomist Zapatista Army of National Liberation
- Juan Jose Pacho (born 1963), Mexican former baseball player and manager
- Aníbal López (1964–2014), Guatemalan artist
- Jesús Tecú Osorio (born 1971), Guatemalan social activist
- Hilario Chi Canul (born 1981), Mexican linguist
- Henry Martín (born 1992), Mexican footballer
- Oscar Santis (born 1999), Guatemalan footballer
- Sergio Chumil (born 2000), Guatemalan cyclist

== Quotes ==
- "We are not myths of the past, ruins in the jungle or zoos. We are people and we want to be respected, not to be victims of intolerance and racism." – Rigoberta Menchú, 1992.

== Films and television ==
- Kings of the Sun (1963), the first major motion picture that depicted a part of Maya history, in this case the conquest of Chichen Itza by Hunac Ceel, a famous Maya general.
- El Norte (film) (1983), one of the first indie films ever produced, about two Maya siblings who immigrate illegally to the U.S. to escape the Maya genocide in Guatemala.
- Apocalypto (2006), an adventure film directed and produced by Mel Gibson, set around the time of European contact with all of the dialogue spoken in Yucatec.
- The Forgotten District (2008), a documentary on Maya ecotourism in southern Belize.
- Heart of Sky, Heart of Earth (2011), a documentary on the Maya of today and their fight to save their culture and environment.
- Mayan Renaissance (2012), starring Rigoberta Menchú.
- Ixcanul (2015), the first movie ever produced completely in Kaqchikel, a Maya language. It's an indie film that relates the life of a young woman in a traditional Maya village.
- La Llorona (2019), a horror film addressing the genocide of the Maya in Guatemala.
- Sons of Anarchy and its sequel spin-off series, Mayans M.C., both FX series, created by Kurt Sutter, feature a fictional Latino outlaw motorcycle club that adopts much of the culture of Maya civilization, reflective in the club's name, the club's patch, and the terminology used by members.
- Black Panther: Wakanda Forever (2022), adventure film sequel with elements of the story of a superhuman Maya tribe with ancestors from the Mesoamerica jungle.

== See also ==
- Acala Chʼol
- Chinamita
- Genetic history of Indigenous peoples of the Americas
- Indigenous peoples of the Americas
- Kejache
- Lakandon Chʼol
- List of Mayan languages
- Manche Chʼol

== Bibliography ==
- van Akkeren, Ruud (July 1999). "Sacrifice at the Maize Tree: Rabʼinal Achi in its historical and symbolic context". Ancient Mesoamerica. 10 (2): 281–295. doi:10.1017/s0956536199102104. S2CID 162123502.
- Chiappari, Christopher L. (March 2002). "Toward a Maya Theology of Liberation: The Reformulation of a 'Traditional' Religion in the Global Context". Journal for the Scientific Study of Religion. 41 (1): 47–67. doi:10.1111/1468-5906.00099.
- Grube, Nikolai (2006). "Maya Today – From Indios Deprived of Rights to the Maya Movement". In Nikolai Grube; Eva Eggebrecht; Matthias Seidel (eds.). Maya: Divine Kings of the Rain Forest. Cologne: Könemann Press. pp. 417–425. ISBN 3-8331-1957-8. OCLC 71165439.
- Mooney, James, Herbermann, Charles, ed. (1913). "Maya Indians" . Catholic Encyclopedia. New York: Robert Appleton Company.
- Restall, Matthew (1997). The Maya World. Yucatecan Culture and Society, 1550–1850. Stanford: Stanford University Press. ISBN 978-0-8047-3658-9.
- Restall, Matthew (March 2004). "Maya Ethnogenesis". The Journal of Latin American Anthropology. 9 (1): 64–89. doi:10.1525/jlca.2004.9.1.64.
- Riis-Hansen, Anders (1992). "Interview with Rigoberta Menchu Tum". Commission for the Defense of Human Rights in Central America (CODEHUCA).
- Warren, Kay B. (1998). Indigenous Movements and Their Critics: Pan-Maya Activism in Guatemala. Princeton: Princeton University Press. ISBN 978-0-691-05882-5.
