= Chan Santa Cruz =

Former indigenous Maya state on the Yucatán Peninsula

Chan Santa Cruz Noj Kaaj Santa Cruz Xbáalam Naj
- 1849–1901
- Flag

- Territory under the Mayan control, c. 1870.
- Capital: Noj Kaaj Santa Cruz Xbáalam Naj
- Common languages: Mayan languages
- Halach Uinik (governor)
  - 1849–1852: Jose Maria Barrera
- Ahau K'atun Kiuik' (supreme general)
  - Longest serving: Bernardino Cen
  - Last: Francisco May
- History
  - Established: 1849
  - Disestablished: 1901
| Preceded by | Succeeded by |
| Republic of Yucatan | Mexico |
- Today part of: Quintana Roo

Chan Santa Cruz, sometimes referred to as the Maya Free State, was a late 19th-century indigenous Maya state in the modern-day Mexican state of Quintana Roo. It was also the name of a shrine that served as the center of the Maya Cruzoob (Note: Also spelled Cruzob or Crusoob.) religious movement, and of the town that developed around the shrine, now known as Felipe Carrillo Puerto. The town was historically the main center of what is now Quintana Roo, and it acted as the de facto capital for the Maya during the Caste War of Yucatán.

== History ==
=== Before and during Spanish colonization ===
Before Spanish colonization, the people in the land that would become the Chan Santa Cruz state were predominantly indigenous Maya. Its northern reaches were likely part of the state of Coba during the Classic Period.

After the Spanish began to occupy nearby areas, the Xiu Maya state in the western half of the Yucatán Peninsula chose to ally with the newly-neighboring Empire. The Itzá state continued to train and educate indigenous Maya leaders in the sanctuaries of the southern province, such as Lake Petén Itzá. General Martín de Ursúa invaded and sacked Nojpetén, the Itzá island capital, on March 13, 1697.

The province of Uaan remained largely unknown to the Spanish, but its provincial capital of Chable (meaning 'anteater') was mentioned several times in the books of Chilam Balam as a cycle seat.

The Spanish conquered the western half of the Itzá state during the 18th century. The most famous of the Spanish campaigns was against the indigenous Kanek (king) and his followers, which ended with the death of the Kanek and his closest followers on December 14, 1761.

=== Uprising ===
When the Criollo class declared Yucatecan independence in the mid-19th century and began fighting over control of the resources of their infant state, the Maya leadership saw an opportunity to gain independence. Letters discovered in the 21st century show that they had been planning this action for some time. These letters were written orders sent through an established military chain of command, and were written in the wake of the death of the Batab of Chichimilla, Antonio Manuel Ay, on August 26, 1847 (6 Kaban, 5 Xul). The letters were written at a sanctuary plaza at Saki', the sacred 'white' city of the north that was located near present-day Valladolid. Exactly three days after Ay's death, the eastern Maya, now identified as Uiz'oob (meaning 'loincloths'), rose up in a general revolt which nearly drove the Yucatecos entirely out of Chan Santa Cruz.

This uprising, called La Guerra de las Castas by the Mexicans, reached its high tide in 1848. It resulted in the independence of the old Itzá Maya state that would become Chan Santa Cruz. The former Xiu Maya state remained in the hands of the Yucateco Creoles. The descendants of this short-lived Maya free state and those who live like them are now commonly known as Cruzoob.

=== Independent Maya state ===
The State of the Cross was proclaimed in 1849 in Xocén, a south-eastern satellite of modern Valladolid, where the Proclamation of Juan de la Cruz (John of the Cross) was first read to the people. The capital, Noh Kah Balam Nah Chan Santa Cruz, was founded in about 1850 near a sacred cenote, a natural well providing a year-round source of holy water. The talking cross continues to speak at this shrine.

The city was laid out in the pre-Columbian Maya style, with a central square containing the Balam Nah, the 'Patron Saint's House', surrounded by the school to the east, the Pontiff's house to the west, the General's houses to the north, and the storehouses and market to the south.

The regional capitals in Bak Halal, Chun Pom, Vigia Chico, and Tulum were probably laid out on the same plan as the capital.

At its greatest extent, from the 1860s through the 1890s, the Chan Santa Cruz state encompassed all of the southern and central parts of the Mexican state of Quintana Roo. Alongside associated buffer and splinter groups, this state was the core of a broader indigenous independence movement that controlled virtually all of the old Iz'a territories. These lands included the eastern, central, and southern portions of the Yucatán peninsula, extending from Cape Catoche down towards what is now northwestern Belize and northeastern Guatemala.

=== The fall of the Maya free state ===
From the late 1850s through 1893, the United Kingdom recognized the Maya free state as a de facto independent nation, even sponsoring treaty negotiations between the Mexican Hispanic Yucateco state and the Maya Cruzoob state. These negotiations resulted in a signed international treaty which was never ratified by either party. The Maya state had extensive trade relations with the British colony of British Honduras, and its military was substantially larger than the garrison and militia in the British colony. In contrast to the Yucatecans and the Mexicans, the British found it both practical and profitable to maintain good relations with the Maya free state for some years.

All this changed after the Maya laid siege to and conquered Bacalar, originally the Mayan holy city of Bak Halal (meaning 'decanting water'). They killed many British citizens, along with the entire Yucatec Creole garrison. It is unclear why the commanding general ordered a wholesale slaughter of the garrison. Regardless of his motives, this action frightened the tiny British colonial establishment in neighboring British Honduras.

The British Government assigned Sir Spenser St. John to disentangle Her Majesty's Government from indigenous free states and from the Chan Santa Cruz state in particular. In 1893, the British Government signed the Spenser Mariscal Treaty, which ceded all of the independent Mayan state's lands to Mexico. At around the same era, the Creoles on the west side of the Yucatán peninsula began to acknowledge that their minority-ruled mini-state was not politically viable long-term. After the Creoles offered their country to any group who would be willing to defend their lives and property, Mexico accepted. With both legal pretext and a convenient staging area in the western side of the Yucatán peninsula, Chan Santa Cruz was occupied by the Mexican army in 1901.

Mexican occupation did not end resistance by the indigenous Maya, who continued to conduct guerrilla attacks against the Mexicans under the leadership of General Francisco May. In 1935, General May signed a formal peace treaty with the government of Mexico.

Various treaties with Mexico called the "Letters of General May" were signed by the leaders of the indigenous state through the late 1930s and 1940s. Following General May's death, the remaining Maya officials initiated contact with the United States government through the archaeologist and American spy Sylvanus Morley.

== Religion ==
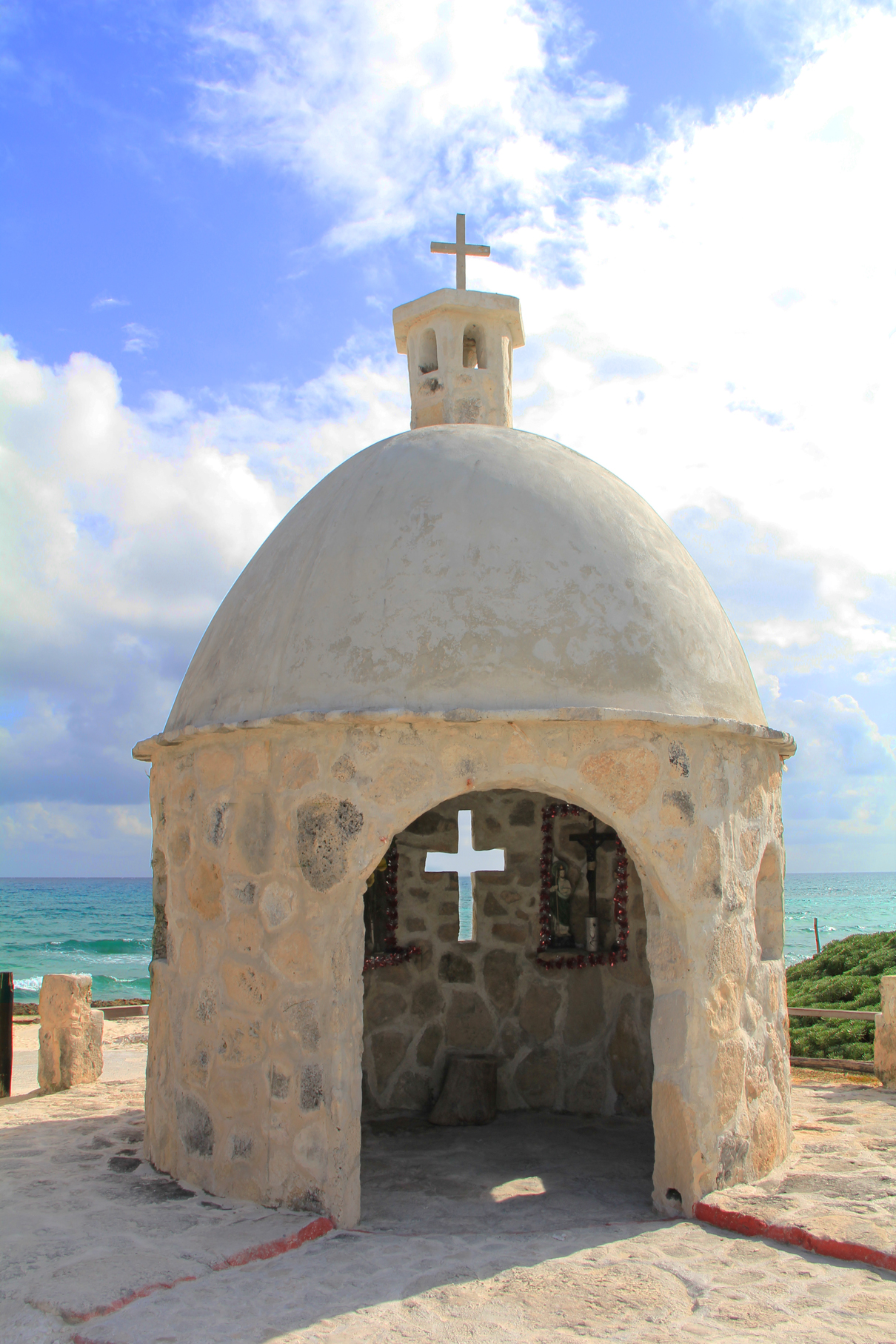
Chan Santa Cruz Monument in Cozumel

One notable aspect of the Maya free state was the reappearance of Maya religion in a partly syncretic form, sometimes called "The Cult of The Talking Cross". This was likely a continuation of native beliefs that reemerged when the Spanish colonists' civil war released the Maya from the Yucatán Hispanic population's religious repression. The indigenous priests had maintained their ancient religious texts and their spiritual knowledge, as they continue to do today.

=== Maya sacred books ===
When Friar Jacobo de Testera arrived, leading the first of the Franciscan Missions to the Maya in the second half of the 16th century, he began a Mayan encyclopedia project. He intended to collect the prayers, orations, commentaries, and descriptions of native life as aids to the Spanish overthrow of Maya culture in general and the Maya religion, specifically. Diego de Landa's famous Relación de las cosas de Yucatán contains much of the Spanish explanatory text of this encyclopedia without quoting any of the indigenous texts.

The Maya elders who participated in this project, including Juan Na Chi Kokom, former leader of the Itza' state in eastern Yucatan, were most likely willing volunteers who thought the project was a way to preserve Maya culture and religion. After the project was anathematized by the Roman Church, the former Maya collaborators collected and reconstructed as much as they could. They assembled the materials into a loose collection of texts, which is now known as the Books of Chilam Balam.

Existing copies of portions of these Books of Chilam Balam ('Spokesman of the Patron') present evidence for distinct Xiu and Itza' versions. Usually translated as a collection of historical and mythological texts, this book contains a great deal of information on the ancient Maya Calendar and the priests who maintained it.

Contents of the Books of Chilam Balam include: daily reminders for diviners; natal charts for each day; rituals associated with each day; direction for the selection, training and initiation of Maya calendar priests; a Maya rosary prayer and a divination prayer; details of sacrifices at the sacred well of Chichen Itza and other self-sacrifices; pilgrimage places; the Maya years and cycles; advice to pregnant women; and descriptions of Maya family life.

The Songs of Dzitbalché is a collection of songs, prayers and ritual speeches. This collection includes traditional girls' songs, prayers for seating images, and other traditions.

The Ritual of the Bakabs is usually translated as a collection of medical texts. The first half of the book is comparable to the books of Chilam Balam of Chumayel and Tizimin and contains Maya songs, advice, prayers and ritual speeches. These texts include ones concerning: the Maya Pontiff; the Chiuoh lineage; seers and novice diviners; a midwife's prayer; and a renewal prayer for the divining seeds. The second half of this book is comparable to the second half of the Chilam Balam of Kauá and Maya herbals, and similarly contains mostly herbal or medical remedies for a wide variety of ailments. The A'almaj T'aan is another holy book of the Cruzo'ob Maya. The A'almaj T'aan means " The law " or the " holy commandments " . The A'almaj T'aan contain the messages of the cross also known as Ki'ichkelem Yuum Juan de la Cruz Tata Tres Personas balam tun. This holy book contains historical events, sermons and also prophecies.

=== The Maya church ===
The emergence of Chan Santa Cruz in the 19th century meant that for the first time in centuries, the Maya were in charge of a state that supported their indigenous faith. The Roman Church had consistently refused to ordain native Maya even as priests. Previously, the maestros cantores (village lay assistants), who were sons of Maya priests, often acted as members of their fathers' profession as well.

The Maya church in every Crusero village and town housed the Holy Cross in a sanctuary. Maya churches are easily distinguished from Roman Catholic churches by the presence of a walled inner sanctum, the gloria, inside the Maya church.

=== Religious figures ===
Maya Cruzoob religious figures and concepts are referred to through a variety of names and terms. K'u (God) is one being, undepictable and incorporeal. K'u can also be called Hunab K'u (Unique God) or Hahal K'u (True God). Epithets for God and His Angels can include Tepal (Lord), Ahau (Lord), and Yumil Kaan (Father of the Sky). Chakoob (Angels) are God's active force, who manifest his will on earth and can be petitioned for aid. There are 1, 4, 5, 6, or 7 chakoob, one for each direction addressed in a particular ritual. The directions are color-coded according to their chakoob. East is red, north is white, west is black, south is yellow, sky is blue, earth is green and the center is clear. Feminine spirits including Kiichpam Kolel (Beautiful Grandmother) and U Kolel Cab, (Grandmother Earth or Guadelupe) are autonomous and can be petitioned for good through prayers before their cross or image. Patrilineal ancestors such as the Yumz'iloob (Fathers) are also autonomous and can be similarly petitioned for good or ill through prayers before the appropriate lineage crosses. A family devotional cross is an Ix Ceel (Little Tree). A balam (Jaguar) is a patron of a village, town, region, or state which acts as an agent and protector of the social unit in question. Many balam form additional units: Balamoob (Jaguars), the Twenty Patrons of the days of the 260-day Sacred Round; the four Yearbearers of the 365-day year; the Ahauoob of the 360-day year; and the K'atun. Ik'oob (Spirits) can be petitioned for good or ill, but K'asal Ik'oob' (Evil Spirits) are chaotic and must be both exorcized before any ritual can begin and appeased before any ritual can end.

=== Worship ===
The Cruzoob movement has two great annual festivals, both descended from the two annual festivals of the pre-Columbian Maya. U K'in Crus (The Day of The Cross) is the ancient Maya New (365-day) Year Festival and U K'in Kolel (The Feast of Our Grandmother, Guadelupe), is the ancient Maya New (360-day) Year Festival.

The Crusoob also celebrate a Mass and Novenas, which always include offerings of corn tortillas and often feature tamales, meat, fruit, atole, pepper, chocolate, a dessert, and an alcoholic beverage.

=== The Holy Cross ===
Holy Crosses are physical crosses that must be guarded and fed several times a day according to Cruzoob tradition. Every householder has a small domestic cross clothed in a diminutive huipil (woman's dress) and with a mirror hung around its neck. This little female cross was known in Pre-Columbian times as Ix Cel (Little or Female Tree). The holy cross is known by the maya as La Santísima or Ki'ichkelem Yuum. Ki'ichkelem Yuum Juan de la Cruz, according to the legend he was a Maya warrior of xocen who became the interpreter of the messages of Yuum k'uj(God) to the Maya macehual during the Caste war. Another legend says that Ki'ichkelem Yuum Juan is the messenger of God who came down from heaven to deliver the messages of Yuum K'uj to the Maya Macehual. Menifestated in form of a cross by the grace of God . Other names Ki'ichkelem Yuum Juan de la Cruz Tata Tres Personas, Juan de la cruz Balam tun, Juan de la cruz Puc. In addition to the village patron cross and the household crosses, there are special lineage crosses for important lines, four guardian crosses at the entrances to town, and other crosses that guard sinkholes and wells. The Maya Cruzoob religion in the 21st century is quite mixed in practice: some followers devoted exclusively to the indigenous church and its ritual calendar, while other followers are exclusively or partially Roman Catholic, Protestant or Evangelical.

The shrines of the "talking crosses" remain a vital part of local culture in former lands of Chan Santa Cruz in the 21st century. As recently as 2002, the Mexican government finally lifted the stigma of witchcraft that indigenous priests had been subject to under Mexican civil and Roman church law. They recognized the Church of the Talking Cross as a legitimate religion, and installed a plaque on a shrine in Carrillo Puerto.

== National records ==
The Maya free state formally declared independence in the "Proclamation of Juan de la Cruz" (El Proclamo in Spanish). Appended to the Proclamation are the former state's constitution and by-laws. In addition to military service requirements — as the constitution was written in time of war — and support for the indigenous church, equal and fair treatment was promised to Maya people (and those of any race) who consented to the sovereignty of the new state.

=== International treaties and correspondence ===
Chan Santa Cruz made treaties and corresponded with several other recognized and partially-recognized governments. These include treaties with: the Yucateco state, sometimes sponsored by the British government in Honduras; the United Kingdom; Mexico; and Guatemala. Chan Santa Cruz officials also corresponded with members of the United States government in Washington.

== Officials ==
Most Maya Cruzoob religious officials were — and are — unpaid, or are paid by donations from wealthy or devout members of the community. These officials are typically among the oldest and most impoverished of the community, having distributed most of their personal property to finance associated community festivals.

Religious officials include or have included:

- Ahau Kan or Ah Z'ab Kan (Lord Wisdom or He Rattle Snake), the Supreme Pontiff of the Maya church, now known as Nohoch Tata (Great Father).
- Kan Ek' (Wise Star), one of four Cardinals who held forth from the four holy cities: Bakhalal, now Bacalar, in the east; Sakil, now the city of Valladolid, in the north; Ich Kan Si Ho, now the city of Merida, in the west; and Cham Putun, now disused and called Champoton, in the south.
- Ek' (Star), one of eight Archbishops in the Maya church, now a disused role.
- Cho'op (Macaw), one of twenty Provincials or Bishops in the Maya Church, now a disused role. Only the Province of Uaan now survives, and therefore the Cho'opil Uaan is now the Supreme Pontiff of the Maya church and is known as the Nohoch Tata. The first Nohoch Tata was Manual Nahuat, who held the role from 1847 until his death on March 23, 1851.
- K'in (Sun), one of eighty Priests, sometimes identified in Spanish as sacerdote. In a disused context, it can refer to a diviner, or to one of a multitude who employs the Maya Sacred Calendar of 20 daily patrons and thirteen daily personalities/numbers.
- Ik' (Spirit), an exorcista or blessing.
- Uay (Familiar Spirit) or Nagual (Medium), one with good relations in the spirit world.
- K'ay (Fish), a cantor.
- T'an (Word) or Rezador, an orator.
- Le (Leaf) or Yerbatero, a herbalist.

Civil officials include or have included:

- Halac Uinik (Real Man) or Presidente Municipal, a civil official at the level of provincial governor or higher. The first Halach Uinik at Chan Santa Cruz was Jose Maria Barrera, who held the position until his assassination in 1852.
- Batab (Hatchet) or Delegado, the local civil official at the village level or lower.
- Tupil (Earring, Novice, or Alderman), any entry-level civil official rank, including the Kambesah (Teacher) and the Kanan K'u (Sacristan).

Military forces were led by Ahau K'atun Kiuik, also called General de la Plaza, the supreme commander of Maya military forces. This position was held by several different individuals. There is some evidence that the first, most effective, and longest serving General of the Plaza was Bernardino Cen. The last fully recognized General of the Plaza was General May, who signed the final peace treaties with the Mexican government in the 1930s and 1940s. Subsequent attempts to revive the generalship have failed to garner the support of the community as a whole, and the military survives primarily as an honor guard for the Maya Church. Under the Ahau K'atun Kiuik were the Ahau K'atun, the Generals. There were four of these Generals, one for each direction. Nonetheless, during the war of liberation, it was the generals of the north and of the south who garnered the most space in the Spanish and British colonial press. The first General of the North was Cecilio Chi, who served from 1847 until his death in May 1849 and was victorious at Valladolid and Iz'amal. The second General of the North was Venancio Pec, who served from 1849 to 1852. The first General of the South was Jacinto Pat, who served from 1847 until his assassination in December 1849, and who was victorious at Peto, Tekax, and Tikul. The second General of the South was Florentino Chan, who served from 1849 to 1852. Other military ranks have included Ah K'atun (Captain) and K'atun (Private or Soldier).

== See also ==
- Caste War of Yucatan
- Folk Catholicism
- Kakure Kirishitan, a Japanese evolution of Catholicism after the interdiction of ordained priests.

== Additional references ==
- Arzapalo Marín, Ramón, 1987, El Ritual de los Bacabes, UNAM, Mexico.
- Ávila Zapata, Felipe Nery, 1974, El General May: Último jefe de las tribus mayas. Ediciones del Gobierno del Estado de Yucatán: Coleccion páginas de nuestra Historia, Mérida, Yucatán, Mexico.
- Bricker, Victoria, 1981 The Indian Christ, The Indian King: the indigenous substrate of Maya myth and ritual. University of Texas Press, Austin.
- Bricker, Victoria and Miram, 2001. The Book of Chilam Balam of Kaua.
- Cogolludo, Tomas, Lopez (1688), Historia de Yucatan
- Clendenin, Inga, 1978. Ambivalent Conquest: Spaniard and Maya in the Yucatan peninsula.
- Chamberlan, 19xx. Materials for a bibliography of the cast war in Yucatan.
- Coe, Michael, 1998. Art of the Maya Scribe.
- Edmonson, Munroe, 1987. Heaven Born Merida: The book of Chilam Balam of Chumayel. University of Texas Press, Austin.
- Gann, Thomas, 188x. Explorations in British Honduras ?.
- Proskouriakoff, Tatiana, 1961. "Lords of the Maya Realm". Expedition Magazine, 4.1.
- Roys, Ralph, 1931. The Ethnobotany of the Maya. Middle American Research Series, Publication 2, New Orleans.
- Roys, Ralph, 1965. The Ritual of the Bacabs, University of Oklahoma Press, Norman.
- Redfield, Robert & Villa Rojas, 1962. Chan Kom: a Maya Village. Field Museum of Natural History, Chicago.
- Thompson, J.E.S. 1933. Explorations in British Honduras. Field Museum of Natural History, Chicago.
- Thompson, J.E.S., 1965. Maya History and Religion. University of Oklahoma Press, Norman.
