= Caste War of Yucatán =

1847–1915 war between the Yucateco and the Maya

Caste War of Yucatán ba'atabil kichkelem Yúum
- Part of the Mexican Indian Wars
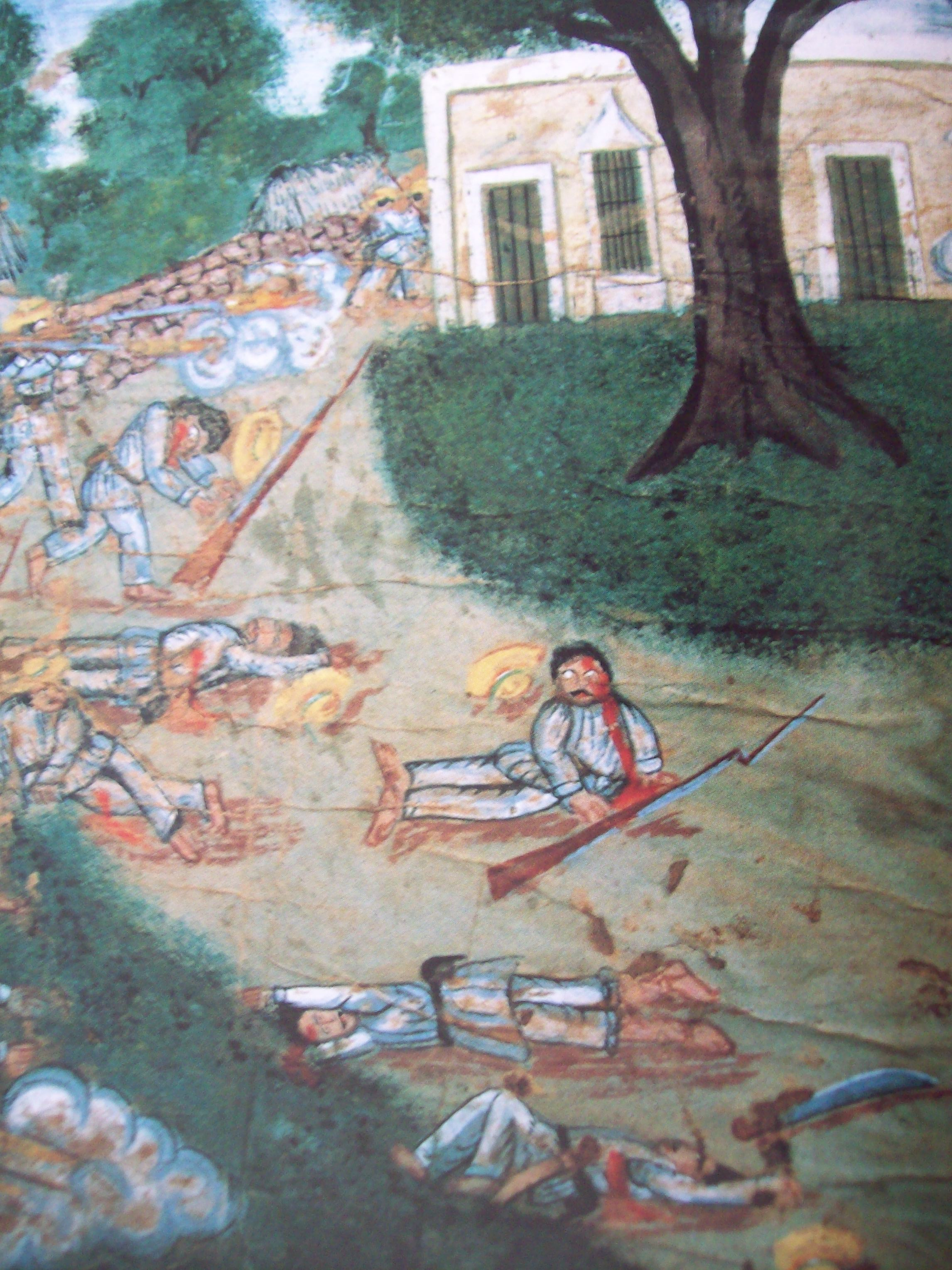
- Top: Territory under the Mayan control, c. 1870. Bottom: Oil painting of the war, c. 1850
Date	1847–1915 (skirmishes continued until 1933)
Location	Yucatán Peninsula, Mexico and Northern Petén in Guatemala
Result	1847–1883: Mayan victory: State of Chan Santa Cruz established.; 1884–1915: Mexican victory: Mexico recaptures the Yucatán Peninsula.; Minor clashes until 1933.

Belligerents
Chan Santa Cruz	Mexico; Guatemala; Republic of Yucatán (1847–1848); British Honduras (from 1897)

Commanders and leaders
Manuel Antonio Ay; Jacinto Pat; Cecilio Chi	(Yucatán) Santiago Méndez; (Mexico) Antonio López de Santa Anna; (Guatemala) Rafael Carrera; (Guatemala) Vicente Cerna y Cerna; (Guatemala) Justo Rufino Barrios

Casualties and losses
~314,000 rebels	50,000 military
- 364,000 in total The population of the Yucatán was halved through war, disease, or migration.

The Caste War of Yucatán or ba'atabil kichkelem Yúum (1847–1915) began with the revolt of Indigenous Maya people of the Yucatán Peninsula against Hispanic populations, called Yucatecos. The latter had held political and economic control of the region after the Spanish conquest of Yucatán and subjugation of the Maya people in the late 16th century. It was one of the most successful modern Native American revolts. A lengthy war ensued between the Yucateco forces based in the northwest of the Yucatán and the independent Maya in the southeast.

The Caste War took place within the economic and political context of late colonial and post-independence Yucatán. By the end of the eighteenth century, Yucatán's population had expanded considerably, and white and mestizo Mexicans migrated to rural towns. Economic opportunities, primarily in the production of henequen and sugar cane, attracted investment and encroachment onto indigenous customary lands in the south and east of the peninsula. Shortly after the Mexican War of Independence in 1821, the Yucatecan congress passed a series of laws that facilitated and encouraged this process. By the 1840s, land alienation had increased precipitously, forcing much of the Maya peasantry to work as indebted laborers on large estates (haciendas). This had a dramatic effect on the Maya and precipitated the war.

In the 1850s, the United Kingdom recognized the Maya state because of the value of its trade with British Honduras (present-day Belize) and provided arms to the rebels at the beginning of the insurgency. By 1867, the Maya occupied parts of the western part of the Yucatán, including the District of Petén, where the Xloschá and Macanché tribes allied with them. During this time, another group of Maya people fleeing the Caste War migrated west into British Honduras and northeast into Petén. From roughly 1850 to 1880, a clear border between Petén and British Honduras had not yet been established, allowing these migrants to build settlements and move across the frontier freely. Growing investment in Mexico resulted in a change in the United Kingdom policy. In the late 19th century, the expansion of commercial logging in British Honduras brought companies such as the Belize Estate and produce company in contact with those Mayan communities living in the frontier settlements established by migrants from the war. In 1893, London signed a new treaty with the Mexican government, recognizing its control of all of the Yucatán, formalizing the border with British Honduras, and closing the British colony to trade with Chan Santa Cruz, the capital of the Maya. Even after the border was officially established, Maya groups living along the western border of British Honduras and the northeastern border of Petén often ignored it, continuing to travel across the frontier to exchange goods and sometimes work legally in both territories. For these groups, the border remained porous in everyday life.

The war unofficially ended in 1901 when the Mexican army occupied Chan Santa Cruz and subdued neighboring areas. The formal end came in 1915 when Mexican forces led by Yucatán Governor Salvador Alvarado subdued the territory. Alvarado introduced reforms from the Mexican Revolution that ended some Maya grievances. Skirmishes with small settlements that rejected Mexican control continued until 1933.

== Background ==
In Spanish colonial times, the Yucatán population (like most of New Spain) operated under a legal caste system: peninsulares (officials born in Spain) were at the top, the criollos of Spanish descent in the next level, followed by the mestizo population (of partial indigenous descent but culturally European/Hispanic), next descendants of the natives who had collaborated with the Spanish conquest of Yucatán, and at the bottom were the other native indios and African slaves.

Some historians have argued that the conflict was more of an inter-ethnic conflict than a caste conflict. It was the members of a large sector of the Maya, not fully assimilated or subdued and living for the most part in the east, who led the struggle. They rebelled against the Europeans, Mestizos, and the assimilated Maya who lived in the area. Not all of the Maya participated in the revolt. For example, Maya in the southern region remained neutral for most of the conflict. In the northern portion of the peninsula, many Maya fought directly against the insurgents.

The indigenous population was concentrated in the Campeche-Mérida region. This was known as the Camino Real, because the majority of the peninsulares and criollos lived in that area. The Maya outnumbered the Latino and Spaniard groups by roughly three to one throughout the Yucatán, but in the east, this ratio was closer to five to one. The elites maintained the strictest discipline and control over the Maya population in the east. The Catholic Church, generally allied with the stronger classes, also had a preponderant role where the military organization was strongest.

During the Mexican War of Independence, the intelligentsia of Yucatán watched the events to the north. Following 1820, they organized their resistance to Spain, forming the Patriotic Confederation, which declared independence from Spain in 1821. The confederation subsequently joined the First Mexican Empire that same year; in 1823 it became a part of the federal Mexican government as the Federated Republic of Yucatán. The government of the republic, based in Mexico City, tended towards centralization, which some people in frontier areas resented.

Near the end of the next decade, several provinces revolted against the central government, including Guatemala in the south and Texas in the north (which was receiving significant unsanctioned European immigration from the United States in the eastern section). To bear the costs of the war against Texas, the national government imposed several taxes, including raising importation duties and the movement of local goods.

In response to this, on 2 May 1839, a federalist movement led by Santiago Imán created a rival government in Tizimín, which soon took over Valladolid, Espita, Izamal, and finally Mérida on the Yucatán peninsula. Imán appealed to the indigenous Maya population, providing them with firearms. He promised to give them land free of tribute and exploitation. With their support, he prevailed in battle. In February 1840, Imán proclaimed Yucatán's return to a federal regime, then in 1841, declared it to be an independent republic. Antonio López de Santa Anna, head of the Mexican government, did not accept this independence, and invaded Yucatán in 1842, establishing a blockade. Land invasion followed, but the Mexican forces were frustrated in their attempts to take either Campeche or Mérida and withdrew to Tampico.

As Yucatán was struggling against Mexican authority, its population became divided into factions. One faction, based in Mérida, was led by Miguel Barbachano, who leaned toward reintegration with Mexico. The other faction was led by Santiago Méndez, based in Campeche. He feared reintegration would expose the region to attack by the United States, as tensions loomed on the northern border that would soon break out in the Mexican–American War. By 1847, the Yucatán Republic had effectively two capitals in the two cities. At the same time, in their struggle against the central government, both leaders had integrated numerous Maya into their armies as soldiers. The Maya, having taken up arms in the course of the war, decided not to set them down again.

== War breaks out ==
The war was rooted in the defense of Santa Cruz Indian communal lands against the expansion of private ownership, which had accompanied the boom in the production of henequen, or agave, an industrial fiber used in rope production. After discovering the value of the plant, from 1833, the wealthier Hispanic Yucatecos developed plantations to cultivate it on a large scale. Not long after the henequen boom, a boom in sugar production led to more wealth for the upper class. They expanded their sugar and henequen plantations by encroaching on Maya communal lands and typically abused their Maya workers by treating them poorly and underpaying them. (See also Wikipedia article on Mérida).

In their correspondence with British Honduras (Belize), rebel Maya leaders cited oppressive taxation as the immediate cause of the war. Jacinto Pat, for example, wrote in 1848 that "what we want is liberty and not oppression, because before we were subjugated with the many contributions and taxes that they imposed on us." Pat's companion, Cecilio Chi, added in 1849 that promises made by the rebel Santiago Imán, that he was "liberating the Indians from the payment of contributions," was a reason to resist the central government. But Imán continued to levy such taxes.

In June 1847, Méndez learned that a large force of armed Maya with supplies had gathered near Vallodolid at the Culumpich, a property owned by Jacinto Pat, the Maya batab (leader). Fearing revolt, Méndez arrested Manuel Antonio Ay, the principal Maya leader of Chichimilá, accused him of planning a revolt, and executed him at the town square of Valladolid. Searching for other insurgents, Méndez burned the town of Tepich and repressed its residents. In the following months, Méndez forces sacked several Maya towns and engaged in arbitrary executions.

Cecilio Chi, the Maya leader of Tepich, with Jacinto Pat attacked Tepich on 30 July 1847. In reaction to the indiscriminate massacre of Maya that had taken place, Chi ordered that all the non-Maya population be killed. By the spring of 1848, the Maya forces had taken over most of the Yucatán, except the walled cities of Campeche and Mérida and the southwest coast. In his 1849 letter, Cecilio Chi noted that Santiago Méndez had come to "put every Indian, big and little, to death" but that the Maya had responded in kind. He wrote "it has pleased God and good fortune that a much greater portion of them [whites, mestizos and allied Indians] than of the Indians [have died]."

Yucatecan troops held the road from Mérida to the port of Sisal. The Yucatecan governor Miguel Barbachano had prepared a decree to evacuate Mérida but was possibly delayed in publishing it by the lack of suitable paper in the besieged capital. The decree became unnecessary when the republican troops suddenly broke the siege and took the offensive with major advances. Historians disagree on the reason for this defeat. According to some, the majority of the Maya troops, not realizing the unique strategic advantage of their siege situation, had left the lines to plant their crops, planning to return after planting. It is said that the appearance of flying ants swarming after heavy rains was the traditional signal for the Maya to start planting. They abandoned the battle. Others argue that the Maya had not laid up enough supplies for the campaign, and were unable to feed their forces any longer, and their break up was to search for food..

Governor Miguel Barbachano of Yucatán sought allies, sending representatives to Cuba to seek Spanish help, to Jamaica to gain aid from the United Kingdom, and to the United States, but none of these foreign powers would intervene. In the United States, the situation in the Yucatán was debated in Congress, but there was no will to fight. Subsequently, Barbachano turned to Mexico City and accepted a return to Mexican authority. Yucatán was officially reunited with Mexico on 17 August 1848. Yucateco forces rallied, aided by guns, money, and troops from Mexico City, and pushed back the Maya from more than half of the state.

By 1850, the Maya occupied two distinct regions in the southeast. In the decade that followed, a stalemate developed, with the Yucatecan government in control of the northwest, and the Maya in control of the southeast, with a sparsely populated jungle frontier in between. In 1850, the Maya of the southeast were inspired to continue the struggle by the apparition of the "Talking Cross". This apparition, believed to be a way in which God communicated with the Maya, dictated that the war continue. Chan Santa Cruz (Small Holy Cross) became the religious and political center of the Maya resistance, and the rebellion became infused with religious meaning. The largest of the independent Maya states was named Chan Santa Cruz, as was its capital city (now named Felipe Carrillo Puerto in Quintana Roo). The followers of the Cross were known as the Cruzo.

The government of Yucatán first declared war over in 1855, but regular skirmishes and occasional deadly major assaults continued by each side. The United Kingdom recognized the Chan Santa Cruz Maya as a de facto independent nation, in part because of the major trade between Chan Santa Cruz and British Honduras (present-day Belize). During the war, the Yucatán government sold Maya prisoners into slavery, and the Peninsula became a platform for the Cuban slave trade.

== Maya independence ==
The Chan Santa Cruz state, stretching from north of Tulum to the Belize border and a considerable distance inland, was the largest of the independent Maya communities of the era but not the only one. José María Echeverría, a sergeant in the army taken captive by the Maya, resided in the town in 1851–1853. He reported later that it had about 200 Maya and 200 whites, all well-armed and apparently fighting together. The whites were under their commander, "a man of reddish complexion". They also had several outlying communities under their control; one contained about 100 people and the others unknown numbers. In 1858, an English visitor thought the Maya had 1,500 fighting men in all. He noted that they took the Santa Cruz with them and that its priests were prominent in the society.

The Ixcanha Maya community had a population of some 1,000 people, who refused the Cruzob's break with traditional Catholicism. In the years of stalemate, Ixcanha agreed to nominal recognition of the government of Mexico in exchange for some guns to defend themselves from Cruzob raids and the promise that the Mexican government would otherwise leave them alone. Mexico City gave Ixcanha autonomy to govern itself through 1894 (following a treaty with the United Kingdom that recognized Mexico's rule over the Yucatán), as it was more worried about the Chan Santa Cruz.

Another important group were the Icaiche Maya, who dominated the jungles of the lower center of the peninsula. In the 1860s under their leader Marcus Canul, they battled against the Mexicans, the Cruzob, and the British from the nearby settlement of British Honduras. Marcus Canul and the Icaiche Maya routed a detachment of British troops on 21 December 1866, at the Battle of San Pedro Yalbac. In 1867, the British mounted a counter-offensive, equipped with newly arrived Congreve rockets. This counter-offensive burned down the villages of San Pedro, Santa Teresa, San José, Naranjal, Cerro, Santa Cruz, and Chunbalche. The Maya briefly took Corozal Town in 1870 and their last major attack was on 1 September 1872, when Canul was mortally wounded at the Battle of Orange Walk. The new Icaiche leaders promised friendship with the British. They soon agreed with the Mexican central government similar to that of the Ixcanha. Years after, the Belize Estate and Produce Company (BEC) began a series of campaigns to forcibly remove Maya from the Yalbac area.

Negotiations in 1883 led to a treaty signed on 11 January 1884, in Belize City by a Chan Santa Cruz general and the Vice-Governor of Yucatán. It recognized Mexican sovereignty over Chan Santa Cruz in exchange for Mexican recognition of Chan Santa Cruz leader Crescencio Poot as Governor of the State of Chan Santa Cruz. The following year a coup d'état took place in Chan Santa Cruz, and the government declared the treaty cancelled.

== 20th century and the end of the war ==
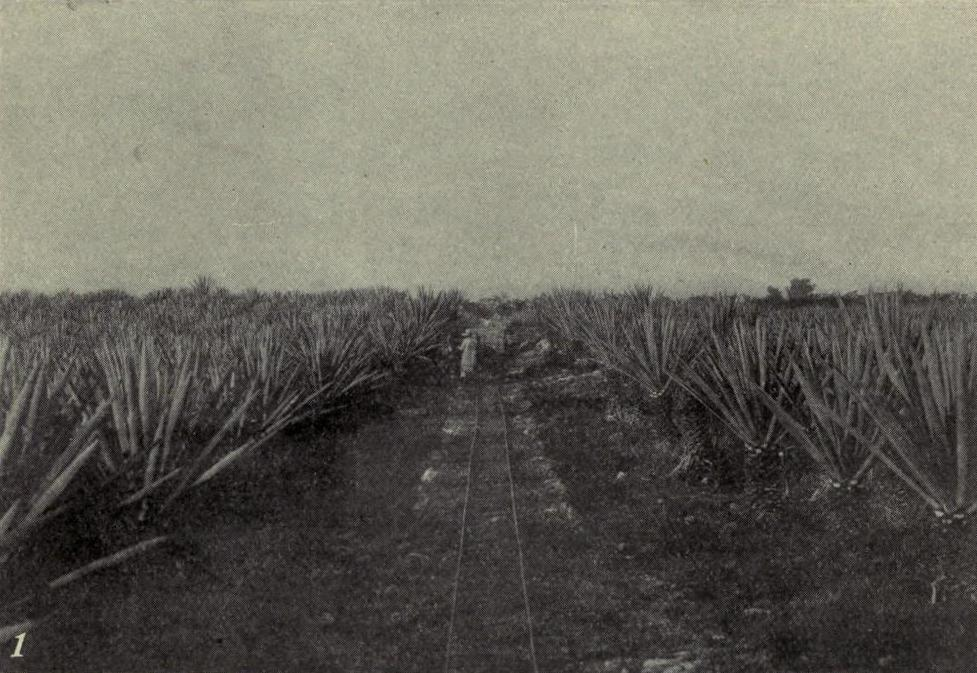
An early 20th century henequen field in Yucatán

In 1893, the United Kingdom maintained good relations with Mexico's Porfirio Díaz administration, and British investment in Mexico had become of much greater economic importance than the trade between the Cruzob and Belize. The UK signed a treaty with Mexico recognizing Mexican sovereignty over the region, formalizing the border between Mexico and British Honduras, and closing their colony's border to trade with the Chan Santa Cruz "rebels". As Belize merchants were Chan Santa Cruz's main source of gunpowder and guns, this was a serious blow for the independent Maya.

In previous decades, the Mexican Army had twice managed to fight its way to the town of Chan Santa Cruz but was driven back both times. In 1901, Mexican general Ignacio Bravo led his troops to the town to stay, occupying it with a large force. Over the next few years, he subdued surrounding villages. Bravo telegraphed the news that the war was over on May 5, 1901. While this is the date most frequently given for the end of the war, fighting continued, although on a smaller scale. On 13 December 1901, the material for building the Decauville railway Vigía Chico-Santa Cruz was ordered in New Orleans. It was officially opened on 4 September 1905.

With their capital lost, the Cruzob split into smaller groups, often hiding in small hamlets in the jungle. Their numbers were seriously reduced by deaths from epidemics of measles and smallpox, endemic diseases carried by General Bravo's troops. Inspired by the persistent Talking Cross sect, the Maya of Chan Santa Cruz remained actively hostile to the Mexican government well into the twentieth century. For many years, any non-Maya who entered the jungles of what is now the Mexican state of Quintana Roo was at risk of being killed outright. The combination of new economic factors, such as the entry of the Wrigley Company's chicle hunters into the region, and the political and social changes resulting from the Mexican Revolution, eventually reduced the hatred and hostility. In one form or another, war and armed struggle had continued for more than 50 years, and an estimated 40,000–50,000 people died in the hostilities.

The war was officially declared over for the final time in September 1915 by General Salvador Alvarado. Alvarado, sent by the revolutionary government in Mexico City to restore order in Yucatán, became governor of the state and implemented reforms that mitigated grievances that had caused the conflict.

Although the war had been declared over many times before in previous decades, records show that the last time the Mexican army considered it necessary to take by force an area village that had never recognized Mexican law was in April 1933. Five Maya and two Mexican soldiers died in the battle for the village of Dzula, which was the last skirmish of a conflict lasting more than 85 years.

== Later developments ==
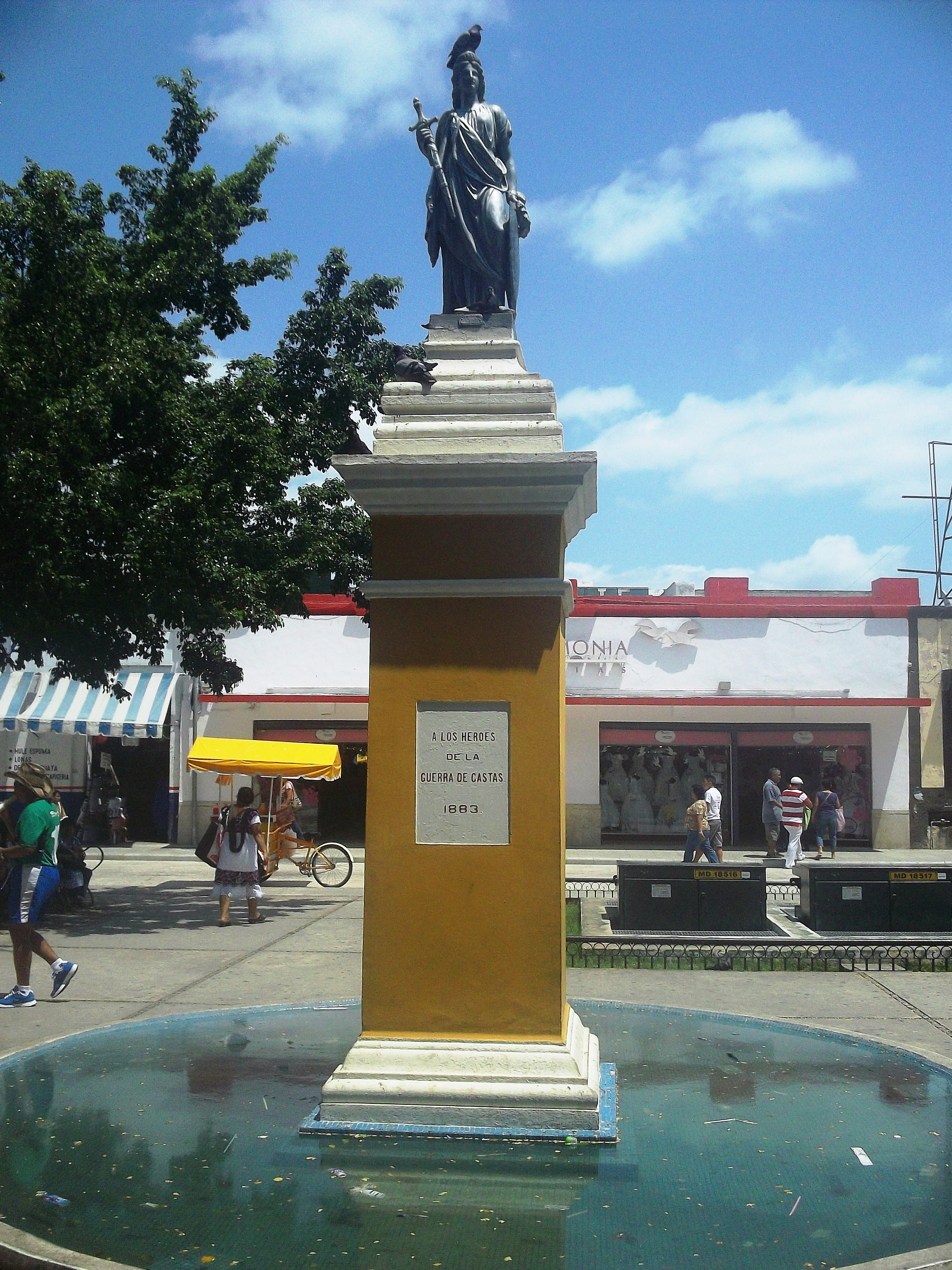
Monument erected in 1883 in Eulogio Rosado Park to the heroes of the Caste War

Since the late 20th century, a similar conflict has existed in the Mexican state of Chiapas, in the southern part of the country, in which indigenous people have declared war on the Mexican government. The Maya Zapatista Army (EZLN) on January 1, 1994, the day when the North American Free Trade Agreement (NAFTA) came into effect, issued its First Declaration from the Lacandon Jungle and its Revolutionary Laws. The EZLN effectively declared war on the Mexican government, which it considered sufficiently out of touch with the will of the people to make it illegitimate. The EZLN stressed that it opted for armed struggle due to the lack of results achieved through peaceful means of protest (such as sit-ins and marches).

In September 2020, archaeologists from the Instituto Nacional de Antropología e Historia (INAH) identified the remains of the ship La Unión as one that was used to carry Maya slaves from Yucatán to Cuba during the Caste War.

In 2021, the governments of Mexico and Guatemala apologized to the Maya people for the repression and war of extermination carried out by both states in the almost 50 years that the war lasted.

== See also ==
- Chan Santa Cruz
- Justo Sierra O'Reilly
- Indigenous land rights
- List of wars involving Mexico
- Casta
- Zapatista Army of National Liberation
