= Tepich =

- Town
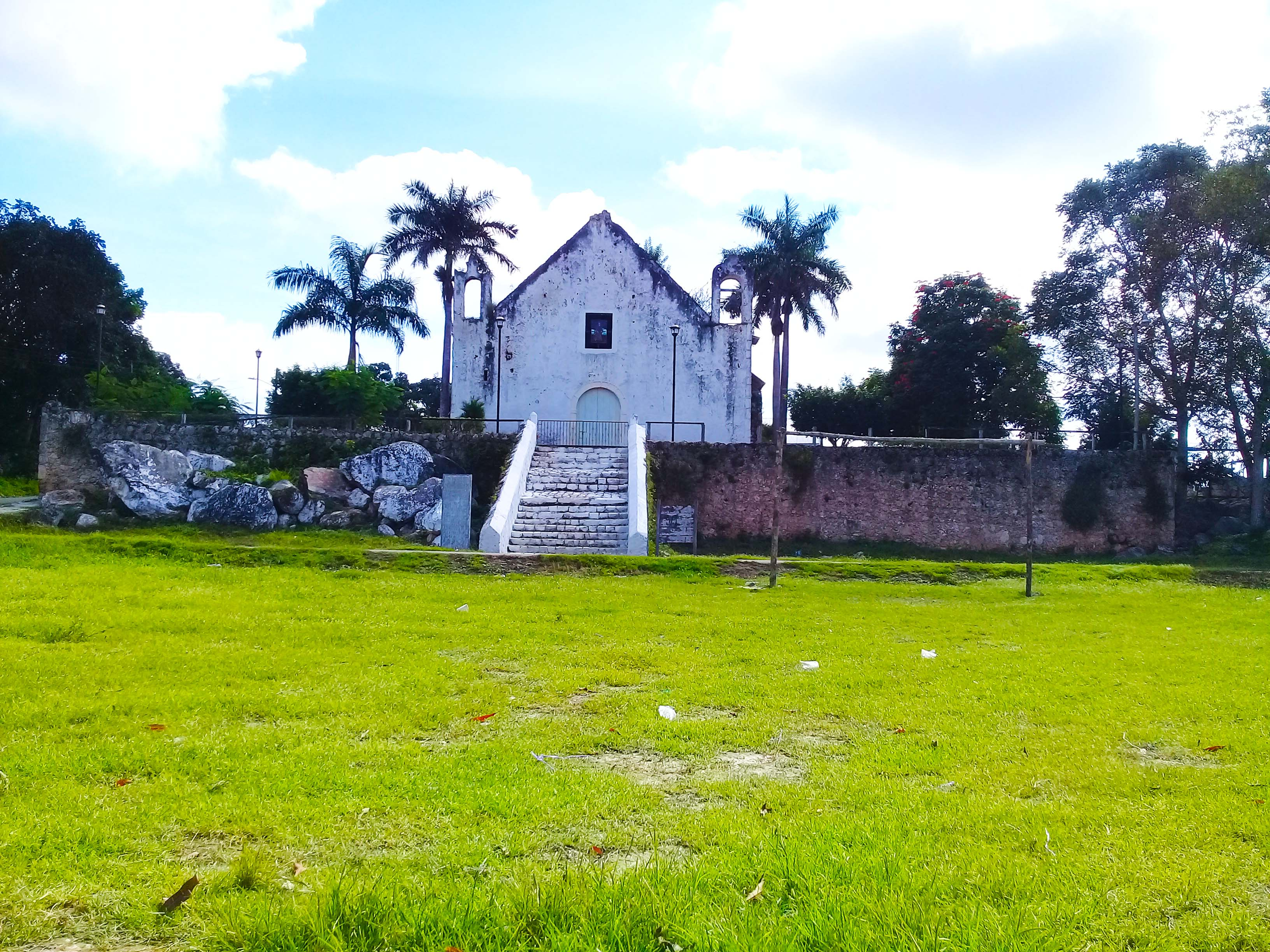
- Tepich church

- Location of the Municipality in Mexico
- Coordinates: 20°14′30″N 88°02′30″W
- Country: Mexico
- State: Quintana Roo
- Municipality: Felipe Carrillo Puerto
- Elevation: 30 m (98 ft)

Population (2010)
  - Total: 2,753
- Time zone: UTC-5 (EST)
- Postal code: 77120
- Area code: 983
- INEGI Code: 230020248

Tepich is a town in the Mexican state of Quintana Roo, Mexico, localized in state center, in the municipality of Felipe Carrillo Puerto. The population was 2,753 inhabitants at the 2010 census.
