= Guatemalan genocide =

1981–1996 genocide of Maya people in Guatemala

- Part of the Guatemalan Civil War
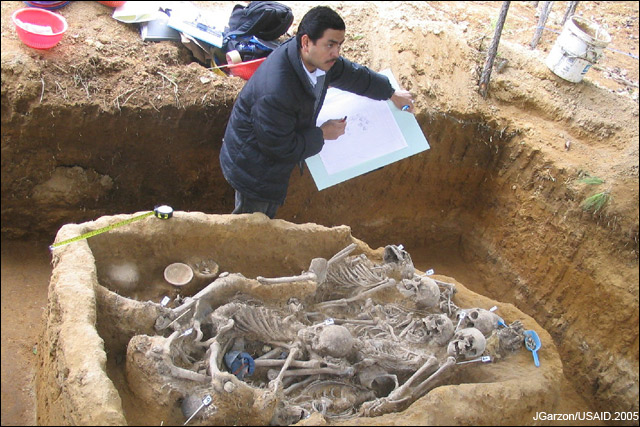
- Excavation of the corpses of victims of the Guatemalan Civil War in Comalapa, Chimaltenango, 2003.
- Location: Guatemala
- Date: Civil War (1960–1996); Silent Holocaust (1981–1983)
- Target: Maya people, alleged communists
- Attack type: Forced disappearance, genocide, genocidal massacre, summary executions, torture, sexual violence, state terrorism, war crimes, crimes against humanity, Democide
- Deaths: Silent Holocaust period (1981–1983): 162,000 total, including 134,600 Maya (Note: 81% of the killing occurred in 1981 through 1983, 83% of the victims were Maya); Civil War: 200,000 total, including 166,000 Maya
- Perpetrators: U.S.-backed Guatemalan military governments, local militias
- Motive: Anti-communism; Anti-Mayan sentiment

The Guatemalan genocide (Spanish: Genocidio guatemalteco), also referred to as the Maya genocide (Genocidio maya), or the Silent Holocaust (Holocausto silencioso), was the mass killing of the Maya Indigenous people during the Guatemalan Civil War (1960–1996) by successive Guatemalan military governments that first took power following the CIA-instigated 1954 Guatemalan coup d'état. Massacres, forced disappearances, torture and summary executions of guerrillas and especially civilians at the hands of security forces had been widespread since 1965, and was a longstanding policy of the U.S.-backed military regimes. Human Rights Watch (HRW) has documented "extraordinarily cruel" actions by the armed forces, mostly against civilians. Anti-communism was one of the main justifications for the mass killings with the military conflating Maya identity with communist subversion.

In the 1970s, the Guatemalan military began a genocidal campaign of mass killings and disappearances of Mayan peasants in the predominantly indigenous northern provinces. They accused the Maya of siding with the Guerrilla Army of the Poor who operated in the region. While massacres had occurred earlier in the war, the systematic use of terror against the Maya began around 1975 and peaked during the first half of the 1980s. The military carried out at least 626 massacres against the Maya during the civil war. They also acknowledged destroying 440 Mayan villages just between 1981 and 1983. In some municipalities, at least one-third of all villages were evacuated or destroyed by the army. Children were often targets of mass killings by the army, including in the Río Negro massacres between 1980 and 1982. A 1984 report by HRW discussed "the murder of thousands by a military government that maintains its authority by terror". In fact, the rights abuses were so severe that even the U.S. with its fervent anti-communist policy "kept its assistance comparatively limited. For most of the 1980s the Guatemalan army relied on fellow pariah-states like Argentina and South Africa for supplies."

An estimated 200,000 Guatemalans were killed during the war, including at least 40,000 persons enforced disappearances. A March 1985 study by the Juvenile Division of the Guatemala Supreme Court estimated that over 200,000 children had lost at least one parent in the war, and that between 45,000 and 60,000 adult Guatemalans had been killed between 1980 and 1985. The United Nations-sponsored Commission for Historical Clarification (CEH) found that 92% of civilian executions were carried out by government forces. The CEH documented 42,275 victims of human rights violations and acts of violence from 7,338 testimonies. 83% of the victims were Maya and 17% Ladino. 91% of victims were killed between 1978 and 1984, with 48% of deaths occurring in 1982 alone. In its final report in 1999, the CEH concluded that a genocide had taken place at the hands of the Armed Forces of Guatemala, and that U.S. training of the officer corps in counterinsurgency techniques "had a significant bearing on human rights violations during the armed confrontation".

Former military dictator General Efraín Ríos Montt (1982–1983) was indicted for his role in the most intense stage of the genocide. He was convicted in 2013 of ordering the deaths of 1,771 people of the Ixil Indigenous group, but that sentence was overturned, and his retrial was not completed by the time of his death in 2018.

== 1954 Guatemalan coup ==
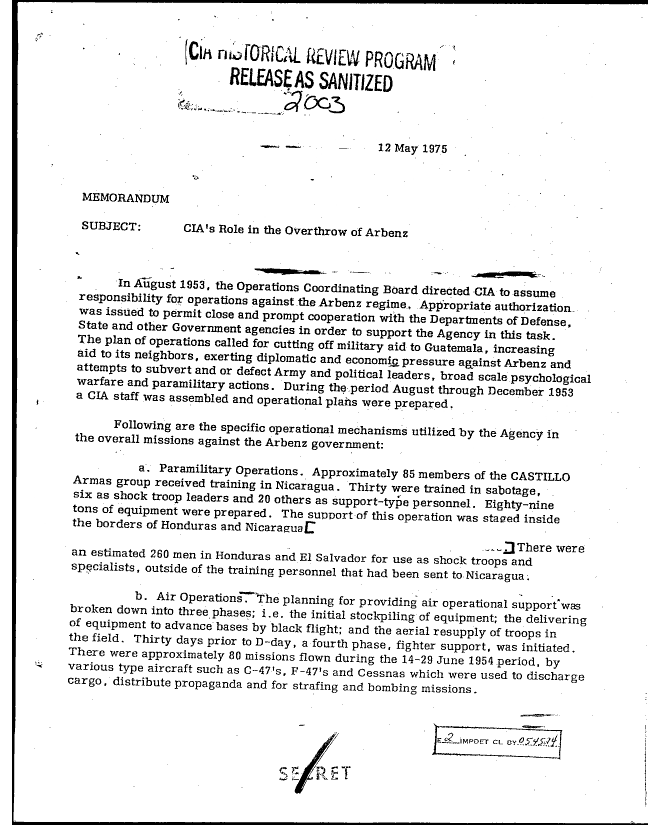
The memorandum which describes the CIA's organisation of the paramilitary deposition of President Jacobo Árbenz in June 1954

The 1954 Guatemalan coup d'état deposed the democratically elected Guatemalan President Jacobo Árbenz and marked the end of the Guatemalan Revolution. The coup had the goal of stopping and reverting the increasingly progressive policies of the democratically-elected Guatemalan government, which clashed with the business interests of US companies amidst the Cold War, notably the United Fruit Company (now Chiquita). It installed the military dictatorship of Carlos Castillo Armas, the first in a series of U.S.-backed authoritarian rulers in Guatemala. The coup was largely the result of a CIA covert operation code-named PBSuccess.

== Terror apparatus ==
Guatemalan intelligence was directed and executed mainly by two bodies: One, the Intelligence Section of the Army, subsequently called Intelligence Directorate of the General Staff of the National Defense and generally known as "G-2" or S-2. The other, the intelligence unit called Presidential Security Department, also known as "Archivo" or AGSAEMP (Archives and Support Services of the Presidential General Staff).

Archivo was formed with money and support from US advisers under President Enrique Peralta Azurdia, during which time it was known as the Presidential Intelligence Agency. A telecommunications database known as the Regional Telecommunications Center or La Regional was integrated into this agency and served as a vital part of the Guatemalan intelligence network. La Regional provided a link between the Presidential Intelligence Agency and all of the main security bodies, including the National Police, the Treasury Guard, the Judicial Police, by way of a VHF-FM intercity frequency. La Regional was also used as a depository for records and intelligence gathered on suspected "subversives", which would have included leftists, trade unionists, student activists, clergy, etc. This intelligence was used to draw up lists of persons to be assassinated.

Orders to carry out assassinations and "disappearances" were passed down the hierarchy to lower level security forces such as the Judicial Police (later renamed as the Detective Corps of the National Police and the DIT) or the Treasury Guard, whose agents – known as confidenciales – could be called from provincial army garrisons to be sent to the capital for unspecified purposes. Treasury Police and National Police confidenciales could also be contracted either through provincial army commanders or by direct contact with provincial commanders of the police services. The confidenciales assembled in the capital using this system were often used in covert operations involving the use of "death squads".

The Inter-American Court of Human Rights has stated that the intelligence services in Guatemala have been responsible for multiple human rights violations. The Truth Commission writes that their activity included the "use of illegal detention centers or 'clandestine prisons', which existed in nearly all Army facilities, in many police installations and even in homes and on other private premises. In these places, victims were not only deprived of their liberty arbitrarily, but they were almost always subjected to interrogation, accompanied by torture and cruel, inhuman or degrading treatment. In the majority of cases, the detainees disappeared or were executed."

The CEH stated that at no time during the internal armed confrontation did the guerrilla groups have the military potential necessary to pose an imminent threat to the State. The number of insurgent combatants was too small to be able to compete in the military arena with the Army, which had more troops and superior weaponry, as well as better training and co-ordination. The State and the Army were well aware that the insurgents’ military capacity did not represent a real threat to Guatemala's political order. The CEH concludes that the State deliberately magnified the military threat of the insurgency, a practice justified by the concept of the internal enemy. The inclusion of all opponents under one banner, democratic or otherwise, pacifist or guerrilla, legal or illegal, communist or non-communist, served to justify numerous and serious crimes. Faced with widespread political, socio-economic and cultural opposition, the State resorted to military operations directed towards the physical annihilation or absolute intimidation of this opposition, through a plan of repression carried out mainly by the Army and national security forces. On this basis the CEH explains why the vast majority of the victims of the acts committed by the State were not combatants in guerrilla groups, but civilians. About 35,000 people were to have died from the genocide.

== Repression in the 1960s and 1970s ==
The use of terror by the military and police forces in Guatemala emerged in the mid-1960s when the military government began to use "disappearances" as a tactic to dismantle the infrastructure of the PGT and MR-13 guerrillas. On 3 and 5 March 1966, the G-2 and the Judicial Police raided three houses in Guatemala City, capturing 28 trade unionists and members of the PGT. Those captured included most of the PGT's central committee and peasant federation leader Leonardo Castillo Flores. All subsequently "disappeared" while in the custody of the security force and became known in subsequent months by the Guatemalan press as "the 28". This incident was followed by a wave of unexplained "disappearances" and killings in Guatemala City and in the countryside which were reported by the Guatemala City press.

When press censorship was lifted for a period, relatives of "the 28" and of others who had "disappeared" in the Zacapa-Izabal military zone went to the press or to the Association of University Students (AEU). Using its legal department, the AEU subsequently pressed for habeas corpus on behalf of the "disappeared" persons. The government denied any involvement in the killings and disappearances. On 16 July 1966, the AEU published a detailed report on abuses in the last months of the Peralta regime in which it named 35 individuals as involved in killings and disappearances, including military commissioners and members of the Ambulant Military Police (PMA) in coordination with the G-2. After the publication of this report, "death-squad" attacks on the AEU and on the University of San Carlos began to intensify. Many law students and members of the AEU were assassinated.

The use of such tactics increased dramatically after the inauguration of President Julio César Méndez Montenegro, who – in a bid to placate right-wing elements in the military – gave it carte blanche to engage in "any means necessary" to pacify the country. The military subsequently ran the counterinsurgency program autonomously from the Presidential House and appointed Vice-Defense Minister, Col. Manuel Francisco Sosa Avila as the main "counterinsurgency coordinator". In addition, the Army General Staff and the Ministry of Defense took control of the Presidential Intelligence Agency – which controlled the La Regional annex – and renamed it the Guatemalan National Security Service (Servicio de Seguridad Nacional de Guatemala – SSNG).

In the city and in the countryside, persons suspected of leftist sympathies began to disappear or turn up dead at an unprecedented rate. In the countryside most "disappearances" and killings were carried out by uniformed army patrols and by locally known PMA or military commissioners, while in the cities the abductions and "disappearances" were usually carried out by heavily armed men in plainclothes, operating out of army and police installations. The army and police denied responsibility, pointing the finger at right wing paramilitary death squads autonomous from the Guatemalan government.

One of the most notorious death squads operating during this period was the MANO, also known as the Mano Blanca ("White Hand"); initially formed by the MLN as a paramilitary front in June 1966 to prevent President Méndez Montenegro from taking office, the MANO was quickly taken over by the military and incorporated into the state's counter-terror apparatus. The MANO – while being the only death squad formed autonomously from the government – had a largely military membership, and received substantial funding from wealthy landowners. The MANO also received information from military intelligence through La Regional, with which it was linked to the Army General Staff and all of the main security forces.

The first leaflets by the MANO appeared on 3 June 1966 in Guatemala City, announcing the impending creation of the "White Hand" or "the hand the will eradicate National Renegades and traitors to the fatherland." In August 1966, MANO leaflets were distributed over Guatemala City by way of light aircraft openly landing in the Air Force section of La Aurora airbase. Their main message was that all patriotic citizens must fully support the army's counterinsurgency initiative and that the army was "the institution of the greatest importance at any latitude, representative of Authority, of Order, and of Respect" and that to "attack it, divide it, or to wish its destruction is indisputably treason to the fatherland."

=== The Zacapa program: 1966–68 ===
With increased military aid from the United States, the 5,000-man Guatemalan Army mounted a large pacification effort in the departments of Zacapa and Izabal in October 1966 dubbed "Operation Guatemala". Col. Carlos Arana Osorio was appointed commander of the "Zacapa-Izabal Military Zone" and took charge of the counter-terror program with guidance and training from 1,000 US Green Berets. Under Colonel Arana's jurisdiction, military strategists armed and fielded various paramilitary death squads to supplement regular army and police units in clandestine terror operations against the FAR's civilian support base. Personnel, weapons, funds and operational instructions were supplied to these organizations by the armed forces. The death squads operated with impunity – permitted by the government to kill any civilians deemed to be either insurgents or insurgent collaborators. The civilian membership of the army's paramilitary units consisted largely of right-wing fanatics with ties to the MLN, founded and led by Mario Sandoval Alarcón, a former participant in the 1954 coup. By 1967, the Guatemalan army claimed to have 1,800 civilian paramilitaries under its direct control.

Blacklists were compiled of suspected guerrilla collaborators and those with communist leanings, as troops and paramilitaries moved through Zacapa systematically arresting suspected insurgents and collaborators; prisoners were either killed on the spot or "disappeared" after being taken to secret detention sites. In villages which the military identified as supportive of the FAR, the Army would publicly execute peasant leaders, threatening to execute more if the villagers did not collaborate with the authorities. Among the numerous clandestine sites used by the army for incommunicado detention and torture of suspects, was the army headquarters in the hamlet of La Palma near Rio Hondo, Zacapa, where hundreds of persons suspected of belonging to the FAR were tortured and executed under G-2 bureau chief Hernán Ovidio Morales Páiz in 1966 and 1967. Government forces often dumped the bodies of victims publicly to foment terror; the press regularly contained reports of unrecognizable corpses found floating in the Motagua River, mutilated by torture. Fishermen in the municipality of Gualan reportedly stopped fishing the Motagua on account of the large number of mutilated bodies found in nets.

Estimates of the number of victims of the army-led counter-terror in the east run in the thousands to tens of thousands. In a 1976 report, Amnesty International cited estimates that 3,000 to 8,000 peasants were killed by the army and paramilitary organizations in Zacapa between October 1966 and March 1968. Other estimates put the death toll at 15,000 in Zacapa during the Mendez period. As a result, Colonel Arana Osorio subsequently earned the nickname "The Butcher of Zacapa" for his brutality. Many high-ranking veterans of the terror campaign – who became known as the "Zacapa Group" – went on to hold positions of great power in subsequent military regime. Among those involved in the Zacapa program were four future Guatemalan presidents – Col. Arana Osorio (1970–1974), Gen. Kjell Eugenio Laugerrud Garcia (1974–1978), Gen. Romeo Lucas Garcia (1978–1982) and Gen. Oscar Humberto Mejia Victores (1983–1986). Arana's garrison intelligence chief – Col. German Chupina Barahona – went on to become the commander of the Mobile Military Police (PMA) and later chief of the National Police.

=== The Arana presidency: 1970–74 ===
In July 1970, Colonel Carlos Arana Osorio was inaugurated as president of the republic. Arana, backed by the army, represented an alliance of the MLN – the originators of the MANO death squad – and the Institutional Democratic Party (MLN-PID). Arana was the first of a string of military rulers allied with the Institutional Democratic Party who dominated Guatemalan politics in the 1970s and early 1980s (his predecessor, Julio César Méndez, while dominated by the army, was a civilian). Arana had been elected on a platform promising a crackdown on law and order issues and subversion. Colonel Arana, who had been in charge of the terror campaign in Zacapa, was an anti-communist hardliner and extreme rightist who once stated, "If it is necessary to turn the country into a cemetery in order to pacify it, I will not hesitate to do so."

Despite minimal armed insurgent activity at the time, Arana declared a "state of siege" on 13 November 1970 and imposed a curfew from 9:00 PM to 5:00 AM, during which time all vehicle and pedestrian traffic—including ambulances, fire engines, nurses, and physicians—were forbidden throughout the national territory. The siege was accompanied by a series of house to house searches by the police, which reportedly led to 1,600 detentions in the capital in the first 15 days of the "State of Siege." High government sources were cited at the time by foreign journalists as acknowledging 700 executions by security forces or paramilitary death squads in the first two months of the "State of Siege". This is corroborated by a January 1971 secret bulletin of the U.S. Defense Intelligence Agency detailing the elimination of hundreds of suspected "terrorists and bandits" in the Guatemalan countryside by the security forces.

While repression continued in the countryside, the Arana government began an unprecedented wave of killings and "disappearances" in the capital, despite minimal guerrilla activity. Arana established a new plainclothes secret police agency known as the 'Detective Corps of the National Police' which specialized in surveillance and political policing activities. This new security agency – working in tandem with special commandos of the military and units from '4th Corps' of the National Police – abducted and murdered thousands of suspected subversives in Guatemala City during the 'state of siege.' As in the earlier campaign in Zacapa, bodies were found floating in rivers. Each day, mutilated, unidentified corpses were displayed in the amphitheater of the General Hospital of Guatemala City for relatives of missing persons to identify. Victims included Arana's critics in the media, members of left-wing political movements, labor unionists and student activists. As in the earlier repression, security agents carried out mass disappearances of entire groups of persons. In one instance on 26 September 1972, the Detective Corps detained eight top leaders and associates of the PGT – half of the Party central committee – in a single raid. All eight were turned over to '4th Corps' squad commander and notorious torturer Juan Antonio "El Chino" Lima Lopez and were never seen again.

According to Amnesty International and domestic human rights organizations such as 'Committee of Relatives of Disappeared Persons', over 15,000 civilian opponents of the security forces were found dead or "disappeared" between 1970 and 1973. The few survivors of political detention by the security forces described tortures such as suffocation with a rubber "hood" filled with insecticide. Many killings were attributed to groups such as the 'Ojo por Ojo' (Eye for an Eye), described in a US State Department intelligence cable as "a largely military membership with some civilian cooperation". Aside from targeting persons labeled as subversives and political foes, security forces also targeted common criminals under the guise of social cleansing groups such as the "Avenging Vulture".

Amnesty International mentioned Guatemala as one of several countries under a human rights state of emergency, while citing "the high incidence of disappearances of Guatemalan citizens" as a major and continuing problem in its 1972–1973 annual report. Overall, as many as 42,000 Guatemalan civilians were killed or "disappeared" between 1966 and 1973.

== Stages of the genocide ==
The repression in Guatemala City and in the eastern regions left the insurgency without a strong civilian support base and reduced the insurgents’ capacity to organize and maintain any formidable guerrilla forces. However, popular discontent with human rights violations and social inequality in Guatemala persisted. The insurgency did not remain dormant for long, and a new guerrilla organization calling itself the Guerrilla Army of the Poor (E.G.P.) entered the forests of Ixcán to the north of Quiché Department from southern Mexico in January 1972, the same year in which Col. Arana announced the end of the 'state of siege'. Unbeknownst to the Guatemalan intelligence services, the EGP embedded itself among the Indigenous campesinos and operated clandestinely for three years, holding its first conference in 1974.

The EGP carried out its first action with the assassination of prominent landowner José Luis Arenas on the premises of his farm "La Perla" on Saturday, 7 June 1975. In front of his office there were between 200 and 300 peasant workers to receive payment. Hidden among the workers were four members of the EGP, who destroyed the communication radio of the farm and executed Arenas. Following the assassination, the guerrillas spoke in Ixil language to the farmers, informing them that they were members of the Guerrilla Army of the Poor and had killed the "Ixcán Tiger" due to his alleged multiple crimes against community members. The attackers then fled towards Chajul, while José Luis Arenas' son, who was in San Luis Ixcán at the time, took refuge in a nearby mountain and awaited the arrival of a plane to take him directly to Guatemala City to the presidential palace. There he immediately reported the matter to Minister of Defense, General Fernando Romeo Lucas García. Romeo Lucas replied, "You are mistaken, there are no guerrillas in the area".

Despite the denial of Gen. Romeo Lucas, the government retaliated with a wave of repression against those it believed to comprise the civilian support mechanisms of the EGP. The government traditionally viewed cooperatives as a vehicle for left wing subversion. Due to the fact that cooperatives had been largely drawn out into the open, the names of cooperativists were relatively easy for the intelligence services (G-2) to collate in order to designate targets for the subsequent extermination program. Peasants identified as belonging to cooperatives began to disappear or turn up dead throughout the Indigenous communities of El Quiche, individually and collectively. In one instance on 7 July 1975 – one month to the date after the assassination of Arenas – a contingent of uniformed army paratroopers arrived in UH-1H helicopters in the marketplace of Ixcán Grande. There they seized 30 men who were members of the Xalbal cooperative and took them away in helicopters; all were subsequently "disappeared". The killings and disappearances were accompanied by a disturbing mimeographed letter sent to Guatemala City cooperatives at the same time in the name of the MANO death squad of the ruling MLN party:

"We know of your PROCOMMUNIST attitude...We know by experience that all labor organizations and cooperatives always fall into the power of Communist Leaders infiltrated into them. We have the organization and the force to prevent this from happening again... There are THIRTY THOUSAND CLANDESTINE PEASANT GRAVES TO BEAR WITNESS...."

The case of the 30 men seized on 7 July, as well as seven other cases of "disappearances" among the same cooperative were named in a sworn statement to General Kjell Laugerud in November 1975. The Ministry of the Interior responded by denying that the "disappeared" persons had been taken by the government. A total of 60 cooperative leaders were confirmed as having been murdered or "disappeared" in Ixcan between June and December 1975. An additional 163 cooperative and village leaders were assassinated by death squads between 1976 and 1978. Believing that the Catholic Church constituted a major part of the social base of the EGP, the regime also began singling out targets among the catechists. Between November 1976 and December 1977, death squads murdered 143 Catholic Action catechists of the 'Diocese of El Quiche.' Documented cases of killings and forced disappearances during this time represent a small fraction of the true number of killings by government forces, especially in the indigenous highlands, as many murders of people went unreported.

=== Massacre in Panzos ===
In 1978, the repression against the Indigenous farming cooperatives began to spread from the department of Quiche into other areas which comprise the Northern Transversal Strip (FTN). In Panzos, Alta Verapaz natives began to be subjected to human rights abuses which accompanied their eviction from their land by farmers and local authorities who supported the economic interests of the Izabal Mining Operations Company (EXMIBAL) and Transmetales. (Note: The human rights abuses were committed by the military and paramilitary security forces which frequently employed brutal tactics against the peasantry. Other threats which peasant proprietors faced at that time were mining projects and the exploration of oil: Exxon, Shenandoah, Hispanoil and Getty Oil all had exploration contracts; additionally, two megaprojects needed to be territorially expanded during that era: the Northern Transversal Strip and the Chixoy Hydroelectric Plant.)

In 1978, a military patrol was stationed a few kilometers from the county seat of Panzós, in a place which was known as "K’inich". At that time, the organizational capacity of the peasants was increased by committees which claimed titles to their land, a phenomenon that worried the landlords. Some of these landlords requested protection from the governor of Alta Verapaz, including Flavio Monzón, who stated: "Several peasants living in the villages and settlements want to burn urban populations to gain access to private property." (Note: In municipal act 34–64 (published 9 January 1965) one can see the first indication of a military presence in the region, when it was written that it was imperative to incorporate order and security in the area.)

On 29 May 1978, peasants from Cahaboncito, Semococh, Rubetzul, Canguachá, Sepacay villages, finca Moyagua and neighborhood La Soledad, decided to hold a public demonstration in the Plaza de Panzós to insist on their claims to the land and express their discontent which was caused by the arbitrary actions of the landowners and the civil and military authorities. Hundreds of indigenous men, women and children went to the square of the municipal seat of Panzós, carrying their tools, machetes and sticks. One of the people who participated in the demonstration states: "The idea was not to fight with anyone, what was required was the clarification of the status of the land. People came from various places and they had guns."

There are different versions of the account on how the shooting began: some say it began when "Mama Maquín"—an important peasant leader—pushed a soldier who was in her way; others say that it started because people who were trying to get into the municipality kept pushing each other, which was interpreted as an act of aggression by the soldiers. The mayor at the time, Walter Overdick, said that "people of the middle of the group pushed those who were in front. A witness says that one protester grabbed the gun from a soldier but did not use it and several people say that a military voice yelled: "One, two, three! Fire!"

The shooting lasted five minutes, and it came from regulation firearms which were carried by the military as well as from the three machine guns which were located on the banks of the square. Between 30 and 106 local inhabitants (figures vary) were killed by the army. Several peasants with machetes wounded several soldiers. No soldier was wounded by gunfire. The square was covered with blood.

Immediately, the army closed the main access roads, despite reports that "the indigenous population felt terrified". An army helicopter flew over the town before picking up wounded soldiers.

=== Genocide under Lucas Garcia ===
After the massacre at Panzós, repression against the indigenous population became increasingly ruthless and a pattern of systematic killings and acts of genocide began to emerge. Several lesser known mass killings occurred during the same time period. On 8 September 1978 the Mobile Military Police of Monteros, Esquipulas, acting on orders from local landowners César Lemus and Domingo Interiano, abducted eight campesinos from Olopa, Chiquimula Department. On 26 September, the Military Police returned to Olopa and seized 15 additional villagers. All were subsequently found dead from drowning and hanging. The next day, the Assistant mayor of Amatillo, Francisco García, addressed himself to the Court of Olopa to report on the events and to request identification of the bodies in order to bury them. That very night Garcia was also abducted and murdered. All told, more than 100 villagers of Olopa were murdered by the Mobile Military Police in 1978, including several religious workers, 15 women and more than 40 children. The PMA were reported by peasants to murder small children in Olopa by grabbing them and breaking their backs over the knees.

"The Command of the Secret Anti-Communist Army [ESA] is presenting by means of this bulletin an ‘ultimatum’ to the following trade unionists, professionals, workers and students: ... [it] warns them all that it has already located them and knows perfectly well where to find these nefarious communist leaders who are already condemned to DEATH, which will therefore be carried out without mercy..."

— Bulletin No. 6, 3 January 1979, ESA

At the same time in Guatemala City, the situation of abductions and disappearances at the hands of the judiciales worsened after Col. German Chupina Barahona was appointed as the chief of the National Police. Chupina openly spoke of the need to "exterminate" leftists. On 4 August 1978, high school and university students, along with other popular movement sectors, organized the mass movement's first urban protest of the Lucas García period. The protests, intended as a march against violence, were attended by an estimated 10,000 people. The new minister of the interior under President Lucas García, Donaldo Álvarez Ruiz, promised to break up any protests organized without government permission. The protesters were then met by the Pelotón Modelo (Model Platoon) of the Guatemalan National Police, then under the new director-general, Colonel Germán Chupina Barahona (like Gen. Romeo Lucas Garcia, a member of the "Zacapa Group" and former commander of the PMA). Employing new anti-riot gear donated by the United States Government, Platoon agents surrounded marchers and tear-gassed them. Students were forced to retreat and dozens of people, mostly school-aged adolescents, were hospitalized. This was followed by more protests and death squad killings throughout the later part of the year. In September 1978 a general strike broke out to protest sharp increases in public transportation fares; the government responded harshly, arresting dozens of protesters and injuring many more. However, as a result of the campaign, the government agreed to the protesters' demands, including the establishment of a public transportation subsidy.

Wary of the possibility that the scenario unfolding in Nicaragua at the time would occur in Guatemala, the government of General Romeo Lucas Garcia began a large-scale covert program of selective assassination, overseen primarily by Interior Minister Donaldo Alvarez Ruiz and National Police chief Col. German Chupina Barahona, who together controlled all of the military and paramilitary security services. Targets included peasants, trade unionists, cooperative members, student activists, university staff, members of the judiciary, church leaders and members of centrist and left-leaning political parties. The deaths of these people, labeled as "subversives" by the government, were largely attributed to a new vigilante organization calling itself the "Secret Anticommunist Army" (ESA), a group linked to the offices of Col. Germán Chupina. The ESA had announced its existence on 18 October 1978 in the aftermath of the bus fare strikes and authored a series of bulletins announcing its intent to murder government opponents. A parallel operation targeting common criminals began at roughly the same time the ESA began its operations. The killings of common "criminals" by the security services were subsequently blamed on a death squad called the "Escuadron de la Muerte" (EM). This new wave of mass killings benefited from a government publicity campaign in which regular statistics were provided by government spokespersons on killings of "subversives" and "criminals" which the authorities attributed to the ESA and the EM, ostensibly as a way of using the media to downplay the government's responsibility and terrorize the left.

Statistics reported in the domestic press (often originating from government spokespersons) and by human rights organizations suggest that a minimum of 8,195 persons were assassinated in Guatemala in 1979–80, a rate which exceeds Col. Arana's "state of siege" in 1970–71. Abductions and disappearances of civilians by the death squads were carried out under the public eye by heavily armed personnel sometimes identifying openly as members of the security forces, and traveling in vehicles easily identifiable as belonging to the Guatemalan National Police and other security agencies, particularly red Toyota jeeps either unmarked or sporting military license number sequences. Unrecognizable cadavers were frequently found mutilated and showing signs of torture.

The bodies of many of those abducted by the death squads in the city were disposed of in San Juan Comalapa, Chimaltenango Department, which became notorious as a dumping ground for cadavers. In March 1980 the cadavers of student activist Liliana Negreros and some three dozen others were found in a ravine on the outskirts of Comalapa. Most had been killed with a garrote or shot in the back of the head and showed signs of torture. The U.S. embassy called the discovery "ominous" and suggested that the extreme right was responsible. CIA sources indicated that "Highest levels of the Guatemala government through the National Police hierarchy are fully aware of the background of the burial site. .[It] was a place where the National Police Detective Corps disposed of its victims after interrogations."

A new agency known as the Presidential General Staff (known by the Spanish acronym EMP) was placed under the command of Col. Héctor Ismael Montalván Batres in 1979. After its formation, the EMP took control of the telecommunications unit La Regional which was renamed Archivo General y Servicios de Apoyo del EMP – AGSAEMP – or Archivo for short. As documented in Amnesty International's 1981 report, the telecommunications annex of the National Palace served as a command center for the death squads, as it had in the early 1970s under Arana. A center existed within the National Police known as the Joint Operations Center (Centro de Operaciones Conjuntas de la Policía – COCP), which forwarded intelligence on "subversives" from the National Police headquarters to the Archivos. Such information included the names of potential death squad victims. Documents were later recovered from the National Police archives which were sent from the COCP to the EMP to notify its agents of "delinquent subversives" and their whereabouts, including exact addresses. (Note: Picture I.1.a, 28 October 1981, "Información confidencial con remisión manuscrita al COCP 1981".)

At the National Palace, a special group known as the CRIO (Centro de Reunion de Informacion y Operaciones) would convene to review operational intelligence and plan counterinsurgency operations. The CRIO consisted of all of the country's primary intelligence and security chiefs, including Gen. Romeo Lucas Garcia, Col. Chupina, Interior Minister Donaldo Alvarez, Gen. Hector Antonio Callejas y Callejas (Chief of the G-2 under Lucas) and the heads of the Treasury Police and the Chief of Migration. It was based on meetings of the CRIO that "hit lists" for the death squads were drawn up.

=== Genocide under General Benedicto Lucas ===
Beginning in the mid-1970s, the government began amassing troops in the countryside to supplement existing PMA detachments and local military commissioners in counterinsurgency operations against the EGP. The level of militarization in the countryside increased after 1979 when conservative elders in the Ixil triangle began requesting the Army's support in eliminating communists. Disappearances and killings of peasants in the Ixil region increased in scale during this period. In 1981, General Benedicto Lucas Garcia (the president's brother) became Chief of Staff of the Guatemalan Army and implemented a new counterinsurgency campaign with the help of the US MilGroup and advisors from Israel and Argentina.

Counting on renewed shipments of military supplies from the U.S. (including helicopters and military vehicles), and an aggressive policy of forced conscription, the Army was able to mobilize troops for a large scale sweep operation through the indigenous Altiplano. The sweep operation began on the Pacific coast in August 1981 and advanced into the highlands in subsequent months. At the time, the National Institute of Cooperatives (INACOOP) declared 250 rural cooperatives illegal in Guatemala, due to alleged ties with Marxist subversion. Subsequently, the army used the official membership lists of these cooperatives to ferret out those they believed to be communist sympathizers and many cooperative members within the indigenous community in the highlands were assassinated by army death squads or "disappeared" after being taken into custody.

On 1 October 1981, a new "task-force" known as 'Iximche' was deployed on counterinsurgency sweep through Chimaltenango, eventually moving into El Quiché and part of Sololá later in the year. In Rabinal, Baja Verapaz on 20 October 1981, the military seized and armed 1,000 Indigenous men and organized them into one of the first "civil patrols" of the decade, a feat which was illegal under the Guatemalan constitution at the time. In a matter of months, the army implemented this system on a widespread basis on the countryside. In creating these militias, Gen. Benedicto Lucas effectively created a structure which superseded local government and was directly subservient to white ladino military authority.

Under the leadership of Benedicto Lucas Garcia, what had begun as a campaign of selective repression targeting specific sectors of Guatemalan society began to metamorphose into a policy of extermination. Wholesale massacres of Mayan communities became commonplace, in what was perceived at the time as a marked change in strategy. In some communities of the region's military forced all residents to leave their homes and concentrate in the county seat under military control. Some families obeyed; others took refuge in the mountains. K'iche' who took refuge in the mountains were identified by the Army with the guerrillas and underwent a military siege, and continuous attacks that prevented them from getting food, shelter and medical care. Sources with the human rights office of the Catholic Church estimated the death toll from government repression in 1981 at over 11,000, with most of the victims indigenous peasants of the Guatemalan highlands.

In 2018, Benedicto Lucas Garcia and three others would be successfully convicted for the 1981 torture and rape of 19-year-old Emma Guadalupe Molina Theissen. Benedicto Lucas Garcia and the other three men captured Theissen at a roadblock and then exploited her detention as political propaganda during this time. They were also found guilty of the forced disappearance of her teenage brother.

=== Genocide under Ríos Montt ===
In the remote Guatemalan highlands, where the military classified those most isolated as being more accessible to the guerrillas, it identified many villages and communities as "red" and targeted them for annihilation. This was especially true in El Quiché, where the army had a well-documented belief from the Benedicto Lucas period that the entire indigenous population of the Ixil area was pro-EGP. A major part of Ríos Montt's pacification strategy in El Quiché was "Operation Sofia", which began on 8 July 1982 on orders from Army Chief of Staff Héctor Mario López Fuentes. "Operation Sofia" was planned and executed by the 1st Battalion of the Guatemalan Airborne Troops with the mission to "exterminate the subversive elements in the area – Quiché."

During Ríos Montt's tenure, the abuse of the civilian population by the army and the PACs reached unprecedented levels, even when compared to the Army's conduct under Benedicto Lucas. These abuses often amounted to overkill, civilians in "red" areas are reported to have been beheaded, garroted, burned alive, bludgeoned to death, or hacked to death with machetes. At least 250,000 children nationwide were estimated to have lost at least one parent to the violence; in El Quiché province alone these children numbered 24,000. In many cases, the Guatemalan military specifically targeted children and the elderly. Soldiers were reported to have killed children in front of their parents by smashing their heads against trees and rocks. Amnesty International documented that the rate of rape of civilian women by the military increased during this period. Soldiers at times raped pregnant women. The Guatemalan military also employed pseudo-operations against the peasants, committing rapes and massacres while disguised as guerrillas. One example is the massacre of up to 300 civilians by government soldiers in the village of Las Dos Erres on 7 December 1982. The abuses included "burying some alive in the village well, killing infants by slamming their heads against walls, keeping young women alive to be raped over the course of three days. This was not an isolated incident. Rather it was one of over 400 massacres documented by the truth commission – some of which, according to the commission, constituted 'acts of genocide.'"

Montt was an evangelical, and his fundamentalist beliefs gave a theological justification to the massacres, the logic of which has been summed up by journalist Vincent Bevins as follows: "they are communists and therefore atheists and therefore they are demons and therefore you can kill them." Most of the victims practiced traditional Mayan religions.

The CIIDH database documented 18,000 killings by government forces in the year 1982. In April 1982 alone (General Efraín Ríos Montt's first full month in office), the military committed 3,330 documented killings, a rate of approximately 111 per day. Historians and analysts estimate the total death toll could exceed this number by the tens of thousands. Some sources estimate a death toll of up to 75,000 during the Ríos Montt period, mostly within the first eight months between April and November 1982.

=== Resurgence of state terrorism in urban areas ===
After overthrowing General Efrain Ríos Montt in a coup on 8 August 1983, the new government of General Oscar Humberto Mejia Victores moved to systematically eliminate what remained of the opposition by using the previously established means of torture, extrajudicial killing and "forced disappearance"- particularly at the hands of the 'Department of Technical Investigations' (DTI), specialized units of the National Police and the "Archivo" intelligence unit. For the purposes of selective terror, the CRIO was reconstituted and meetings between high ranking security chiefs were again held in the presidential palace to coordinate the repression. Officers who participated in the CRIO selection process included new jefe of the G-2, Col. Byron Disrael Lima Estrada; chief of the EMP, Juan Jose Marroquin Salazar and National Police Chief, Col. Hector Bol de la Cruz. In Mejia Victores's first full month in power, the number of documented monthly kidnappings jumped from 12 in August to 56 in September. The victims included a number of US Agency for International Development employees, officials from moderate and leftist political parties, and Catholic priests. Intelligence was "extracted through torture" and used by the CRIO to coordinate joint military and police raids on suspected insurgent safe-houses in which hundreds of individuals were captured and "disappeared" or found dead later. A special counterinsurgency unit of the National Police was activated under Col. Hector Bol de la Cruz known as the Special Operations Brigade (BROE), which operated out of the fifth police precinct in Guatemala City. The BROE carried out the work of National Police squads which had been disbanded under the previous government – such as the Commando Six – and was linked to dozens of documented forced disappearances.

In a report to the United Nations, Guatemala's Human Rights Commission reported 713 extrajudicial killings and 506 disappearances of Guatemalans in the period from January to September 1984. A secret United States Department of Defense report from March 1986 noted that from 8 August 1983 to 31 December 1985, there were a total of 2,883 recorded kidnappings (3.29 daily); and kidnappings averaged a total of 137 a month through 1984 (a total of approximately 1,644 cases). The report linked these violations to a systematic program of abduction and killing by the security forces under Mejía Víctores, noting, "while criminal activity accounts for a small percentage of the cases, and from time to time individuals ‘disappear’ to go elsewhere, the security forces and paramilitary groups are responsible for most kidnappings. Insurgent groups do not now normally use kidnapping as a political tactic."

Between 1984 and 1986, military intelligence (G-2) maintained an operations center for the counterinsurgency programs in southwest Guatemala at the southern airbase at Retalhuleu. There, the G-2 operated a clandestine interrogation center for suspected insurgents and collaborators. Captured suspects were reportedly detained in water-filled pits along the perimeter of the base, which were covered with cages. In order to avoid drowning, prisoners were forced to hold onto the cages over the pits. The bodies of prisoners tortured to death and live prisoners marked for disappearance were thrown out of IAI-201 Aravas by the Guatemalan Air Force over the Pacific Ocean ("death flights").

== Select list of massacres ==
=== La Llorona massacre, El Estor ===
La Llorona, located about 18 kilometers from El Estor, department of Izabal (part of the Northern Transversal Strip), was a small village with no more than 20 houses. Most of the first settlers who arrived there were from the areas of Senahú and Panzós, both in Alta Verapaz. In 1981, the population totaled about 130 people, all of them were members of the Q'eqchi' ethnic group. Few of the people spoke Spanish and most of them worked in their own cornfields, sporadically, they worked for the local landowners. In the vicinity are the villages of El Bongo, Socela, Benque, Rio Pita, Santa Maria, Big Plan and New Hope. Conflicts in the area were related to land tenure, highlighting the uncertainty about the boundaries which existed between farms and communities, and the lack of titles. Because the National Institute of Agrarian Transformation (INTA) was not registered as a legitimate owner of land which was occupied by La Llorona, the members of the community continued to believe that the land belonged to the state, which had taken steps to obtain its title to the property. However, a farmer who was very influential in the area occupied part of the land, generating a conflict between him and the members of the community; on their own initiative, men of the village devised a new boundary between the community's land and the farmer's land, but the problem remained dormant.

In the second half of the seventies when the presence of guerrillas in the villages was first reported by Ramon, the commander of the aparacimiento, who talked to people and said that they were members of the Guerrilla Army of the Poor. They passed many villages, asked what problems their residents were experiencing and offered to solve them. They told the peasants that the land belonged to the poor and they also told the peasants that they should trust them. In 1977, Ramon, a guerrilla commander, regularly visited the village of La Llorona and after he found out that the issue of land ownership was causing many problems in the community, he taught people to practice new measurements, which spread fear among landowners. That same year, the group which was under Ramon's command arbitrarily executed the Spanish landowner José Hernández, near El Recreo, which he owned. Following this act, a clandestine group of mercenaries, dubbed the "fighters of the rich" was formed to protect the interests of landlords; the public authority of El Estor organized the group and paid its members, stemming from the funding of major landowners. The group, irregular, was related to the military commissioners of the region and with commanders of the Army, but mutual rivalries also existed. The secret organization murdered several people, including victims who had no connection to insurgent groups.

In December 1978, the EGP group's leader, Ramon, was captured by soldiers of the military detachment in El Estor and transferred to the military zone of Puerto Barrios; after two years of imprisonment, he escaped and returned to El Estor; but this time, he returned as an officer in the Army G2 and he joined a group of soldiers that came to the village. On the evening of 28 September 1981, an army officer who was accompanied by four soldiers and a military commissioner met with about 30 civilians. At seven o'clock, over 30 civilians, mostly from "Nueva Esperanza", including several 'informants' who were known to military intelligence, gathered around La Llorona along with some military commissioners and a small group of soldiers and army officers. Then they entered the village. Civilians and commissioners entered 12 houses, and each of them removed men from their own homes and shot them dead outside; those men who tried to escape were also killed. Women who tried to protect their husbands were beaten. While the military commissioners and civilians executed men, soldiers removed the victims' belongings; within half an hour, the perpetrators of the assault left the village. The bodies of the victims, 14 in all, were in front of houses. Women ran to the nearest village, El Bongo, and asked for help, despite the fact that they would have been killed if they revealed what had happened. After a few hours, women came back with people who helped them bury the bodies. Days later, widows, with almost 60 fatherless children were welcomed by the parish of El Estor for several days, until the soldiers forced them to return to their village. Two widows of those who were executed on 29 September established a close relationship with the military commissioners from Bongo. This situation triggered divisions that still exist in the community.

The economic and social activity was disrupted in the village: widows had to take the jobs of their husbands; because of their lack of knowledge of the cultivation of land, they harvested very little corn and beans. Diseases were also widespread, especially among children and the elderly, there was no food or clothing. The teacher who worked in the village only came part-time, mostly out of fear, but he left after he realized that it was not worth staying because young people had to work. Nor could they spend money on travel. The village had no teacher for the next four years. The events finally triggered the breakup of the community. Some village women knew that their husbands were killed because they knew three others who were linked to the guerrillas and they were also involved in a land dispute.

According to the Historical Clarification Commission, the landlord who the villagers had the land dispute with took advantage of the situation in order to appropriate another 12 acres of land.

=== List of other rural massacres and mass disappearances ===
The report of the Recovery of Historical Memory lists 422 massacres committed by both sides in the conflict; however, it also states that they did the best they could in terms of obtaining information and therefore the list is incomplete; therefore the list includes some cases documented in other reports as well. Most documented massacres by state actors occurred from 1981 to 1983.

Select army massacres
#	Location	Department	Date	Root cause
1	Sansirisay, Jalapa	El Progresso	late-March 1973	Forces under the direction of then-Army Chief-of-Staff, Gen. Efrain Ríos Montt, massacred scores of unarmed campesinos in retaliation for a land takeover by Xinca peasants in El Progresso in Eastern Guatemala. The officially reported death toll was 15, though the true total is estimated to be in the hundreds.
2	Xalbal (cooperative), Ixcan	Quiche	7 July 1975	Shortly after the EGP's first known guerrilla action in the area, a contingent of army paratroopers arrived in the marketplace of Ixcán Grande. There they seized 30 men who were members of the Xalbal cooperative and took them away in helicopters; all were subsequently "disappeared".
3	Olopa (municipality)	Chiquimula	September 1978	Some 100 villagers were killed or "disappeared" by the Mobile Military Police of Monteros, Esquipulas in the municipality of Olopa in a series of mass killings in 1978, including several religious workers, 15 women and more than 40 children. In one incident on 16 September, PMA officers abducted 15 campesinos who were later found dead from drowning and hanging. The PMA reportedly killed children by breaking their backs over their knees.
4	Chajul (municipality)	Quiche	9 December 1979	The army abducted nine peasants from Uspantán and transported them to Chajul in a helicopter. Two of the peasants captured by the army managed to escape, while those remaining were dressed in olive drab by the army. After being put in uniform, the peasants were equipped with shotguns and instructed by soldiers to march down a road outside of Chajul. The soldiers then shot all seven. The army announced that the campesinos were guerrillas, who had attempted to assault the detachment at Chajul.
5	San Juan Cotzal (village), Ixil Community	Quiche	28 July 1980	The army executed 64 peasants in reprisal for an EGP raid on the military barracks at San Juan Cotzal.
6	Comalapa (municipality)	Chimaltenango	4 February 1981	In the first week of February, units of the Army carried out searches in the villages of Papa-Chala, Patzaj and Panimacac in the municipality of Compala. In the process the Army murdered 168 peasants, including women and children.
7	Cocob (village), Nebaj	Quiche	17 April 1981	On 15 April, EGP rebels attacked an army patrol from the village of Cocob near Nebaj, killing five personnel. On 17 April a reinforced company of Airborne troops was deployed to the village. According to a CIA report, they discovered fox holes, guerrillas and a hostile population. "The soldiers were forced to fire at anything that moved." The army killed 65 civilians, including 34 children, five adolescents, 23 adults and two elderly people.
8	San Francisco Cotzal (village), Ixil Community	Quiche	May 1981	The army arrived in the central plaza of the community in civilian clothes and lined up the Indigenous peasants -men, women and children – and began demanding identification cards. An informant for the army with a hood covering his face began identifying suspected subversives who were killed. An estimated 35people were executed and 35 others were taken away and disappeared.
9	El Arbolito (village, cooperative), La Libertad	Peten	17–24 June 1981	Some 50 villagers were killed and an unknown numbers were seized and "disappeared" at El Arbolito. Survivors describe mock executions, burning with incendiary objects and suffocation with hoods full of chemicals. Others were forced to wear rubber gloves on their hands and other body parts which were set on fire, in some cases burning down to the bone.
10	Panacal (village), Rabinal	Baja Verapaz	3–4 December 1981	At total of 52 community members of Panacal were massacred, including five on 3 December 1981 and 47 on the following day.
11	Pichec (village), Rabinal	Baja Verapaz	1 November 1981 – 2 January 1982	Pichec endured three massacres with a total of 97 victims. This includes 32 men killed on 1 November 1981, 30 killed on 22 November 1981, and 35 killed on 2 January 1982.
12	Chisis (village), San Juan Cotzal	Quiché	13 February 1982	Chisís was a military target for the Army, who considered the village symbolic for the EGP and believed it was the guerrilla headquarters where the attacks in Chajul, Cotzal, and Nebaj had been planned. In January 1982, EGP attacked Cotzal military base a second time; the attack lasted 2 hours and 20 minutes, resulting in 100 military casualties and 20 for the guerrillas. PAC and Army battalions, in revenge, completely destroy Chisis, leaving approximately 200 dead civilians behind.
13	Xix (village), Chajul	Quiché	16 February 1982	A total of 51 members of the community were assassinated in Xix in a series of incidents, the most deadly of which was the massacre of more than 18 persons on 16 February 1982. Among the victims were 11 children and a pregnant woman who was eviscerated. Others were locked in their homes and burned alive or bludgeoned with machetes.
14	Ilom (village), Chajul	Quiché	23 March 1982	Army informants assisted troops in vetting out alleged guerrillas among a group of Indigenous peasants from Ilom; 96 accused peasants were executed in front of their families. Prior to this, the army and civil patrols had killed at least 28 men from the village, including 16 who were seized on 15 January 1982 and disappeared. Another 60 children died from disease and hunger in the months following the massacre.
15	Chel (village), Chajul	Quiché	3 April 1982	A part of operation "Victoria 82", Army soldiers from the military fort in "La Perla" rushed into Chel settlement, because it had been targeted as "subversive". The attack left 95 dead civilians.
16	La Plazuela, San Martin Jilotepeque	Chimaltenango	17 April 1982	Soldiers repeatedly attacked the civilian population of La Plazuela over a three-month period, massacring a total of 150 persons.
17	Acul (village), Nebaj	Quiché	April 1982	Combat against EGP. There were 17 deaths.
18	Plan de Sánchez (village), Rabinal	Baja Verapaz	18 July 1982	The army abused and massacred 250 Mayan villagers (mostly elderly, women and children) after first bombarding the village from the air and with mortars. Soldiers raped and executed young girls and killed children by smashing them against the ground and throwing them into burning houses.
19	Santa Anita las Canoas (village), San Martin Jilotepeque	Chimaltenango	14 October 1982	Soldiers massacred 14 inhabitants on 14 October 1982. In the previous months, security forces had assassinated more than 30 villagers.
20	Dos Erres (village), La Libertad	Peten	8 December 1982	In an apparent pseudo-operation dubbed "Operation Brushcutter", 58 Kaibiles disguised as guerrilla combatants entered Dos Erres on 6 December 1982. Over the next several days, the Kaibiles raped young girls, ripped fetuses out of the wombs of pregnant women and bashed villagers over the heads with hammers, before disposing of the bodies in a well. At least 225 villagers were killed, possibly as many as 300.
21	Sumal, Nebaj	Quiche	March 1983	Soldiers from the provisional outpost in the Sumal Hills captured a group of eight to ten people hiding in the hills near the outpost and burned them alive in a bonfire.
22	Refugee settlement, Penas Blancas	Alta Verapaz	8 August 1983	Amnesty International received reports that 32 people – including 14 children – were massacred at a displaced persons camp near Penas Blancas on 8 August 1983.
23	Xeuvicalvitz (village), Nebaj	Quiche	29 May 1984	A group of 100 soldiers from the Sumalito army detachment arrived in the village, causing villagers to flee into the mountains. The majority of the troops left, save for a group of soldiers hiding in wait. When some of the villagers returned and sought refuge in one of the houses, they were ambushed, and 25 men, women and children were killed in the subsequent massacre.
24	Xeatzan Bajo (village), Patzun	Chimaltenango	18 January 1985	The army tortured and killed 8 men (all civil patrollers) in a schoolhouse and forced other members of the civil patrol to clean up the blood in the schoolhouse and bury the remains. A Catholic church report in July 1985 stated that over 60 peasants were killed by the Army in Patzun in the following seven months.
25	Xeucalvitz (village), Nebaj	Quiche	28–29 July 1986	Army troops from "La Perla" detachment massacred 33 unarmed villagers – including women and children – after bombarding the village with machine-gun fire and mortars.
25	Chiúl (village), Cubulco	Baja Verapaz	21 May 1988	Witnesses say members of the armed forces captured hundreds of residents and took them to the local military garrison, where they separated the children from their parents. According to Arnulfo Oxlaj, a survivor of the massacre, 116 children between the ages of two and 15 were tortured and thrown into what was then a well inside the facility, where they drowned.

== Reparations and reconciliation ==
The UN-sponsored Commission for Historical Clarification (CEH) documented 42,275 victims of human rights violations during the civil war from 7,338 testimonies. 83% of identified victims were Maya and 17% were Ladino. The government was responsible for 93% of the violations, including 92% of the arbitrary executions and 91% of forced disappearances.

The CEH's final report recommended several measures to promote reparation and reconciliation, including the creation of a National Reparations Program, searches for the disappeared, and exhumations of victims to bring closure to families. The report also called for an official public apology from both the president and the ex-leadership of the URNG, the creation of monuments, a holiday to commemorate victims, and the widespread distribution of the report to educate about the war and promote a culture of "mutual respect." The CEH report advocated social and agrarian reform, specifically declaring the need to reform the judicial system and address racism and social inequality.

Of these recommendations, only a few have been implemented by 2012. The National Reparations Program (Spanish: Programa Nacional de Resarcimiento, or PNR) was created in 2003, mandated to focus on "material restitution, economic restitution, cultural restitution, dignifying victims and psycho-social reparations." According to the UN High Commission on Refugees, as of March 2012, 52,333 victims had been registered with the PNR and of those, more than 24,000 victims and/or families had received monetary reparations for crimes including rape, torture, execution and forced disappearance. Some other measures, such as naming streets after victims and creating a "Day of Dignity" to commemorate victims, have been instituted. PNR has primarily worked on economic reparation.

Following the release of the CEH report in 1999, President Álvaro Arzú apologized for the government's role in the atrocities of the war. Ex-leaders of the URNG also apologized and asked forgiveness of the victims. In 2012, President Otto Pérez Molina denied that there had been genocide in Guatemala, arguing that it was impossible as a large portion of the army was indigenous.

The report was disseminated country-wide, but only parts of it were translated into Mayan languages. In addition, high rates of illiteracy have made it difficult for the general population to read the written report.

Exhumations of victims have been pursued throughout Guatemala, providing some truth through discovery of bodies. Several NGOs have been created to provide psychological support to families witnessing an exhumation, and forensic groups have helped with identification of remains. This has provided both closure for some families as they locate loved ones, and potential evidence for future government prosecution of crimes. One such group is the Fundación de Antropología Forense de Guatemala which has exhumed "8,355" bodies as of the 25th of March 2025.

While Guatemala has achieved some forms of reparation, it faces significant instability and social inequality. Many of the estimated 1.5 million people displaced by the civil war have remained displaced. One million people migrated to the United States. In addition, in 2005, there were 5,338 murders in a total population of 12 million. The high levels of violence and instability in Guatemala are exemplified by a clash between protesters and police in October 2012, when police opened fire on a group of protesting teachers, killing seven. The country still has high rates of poverty, illiteracy, infant mortality and malnutrition.

== Genocide denial ==
Both David Matthew Stoll and Carlos Sabino deny that the Guatemalan genocide occurred, along with the 200,000 deaths cited by Patrick Ball, to whom the aforementioned figure is attributed by the C.E.H. report, "Among his most interesting points: (1) he thought he could identify about 40,000 countable victims, and (2) this led him to project a total death toll of 132,000—but just for the period 1979–1996 and excluding San Martin Jilotepeque. The additional 68,000, he told us, were someone else’s responsibility that he could not defend scientifically." Stoll accepts that the report's "29,830 dead or missing persons were obviously an undercount" but likely not by much citing a high-end estimate of "40,000 to 60,000". Stoll claimed in endnote 2 that the multiplier the C.E.H. report used, 6.7 times the dead and missing they counted, is far too high and rests on faulty assumptions. Stoll writes of the 200,000 figure "In actuality, it is a very high-end estimate". Regarding the ethnic component, "Until 1980, the majority of noncombatants killed by government forces were non-Indigenous ladinos. The Mayan population had remained on the margins because the war originated as a conflict between left- and right-wing army officers." When Mayan villages began being targeted Ladino villages were not thereby left alone suggesting ethnicity was not the main component but class which resulted in solidarity amidst army attacks. Stoll however does agree that there were human rights abuses and war-crimes committed including that the majority of killings were perpetrated by the Government and that José Efraín Ríos Montt "Should Have Been Prosecuted for Command Responsibility for War Crimes".

== Prosecutions and convictions ==
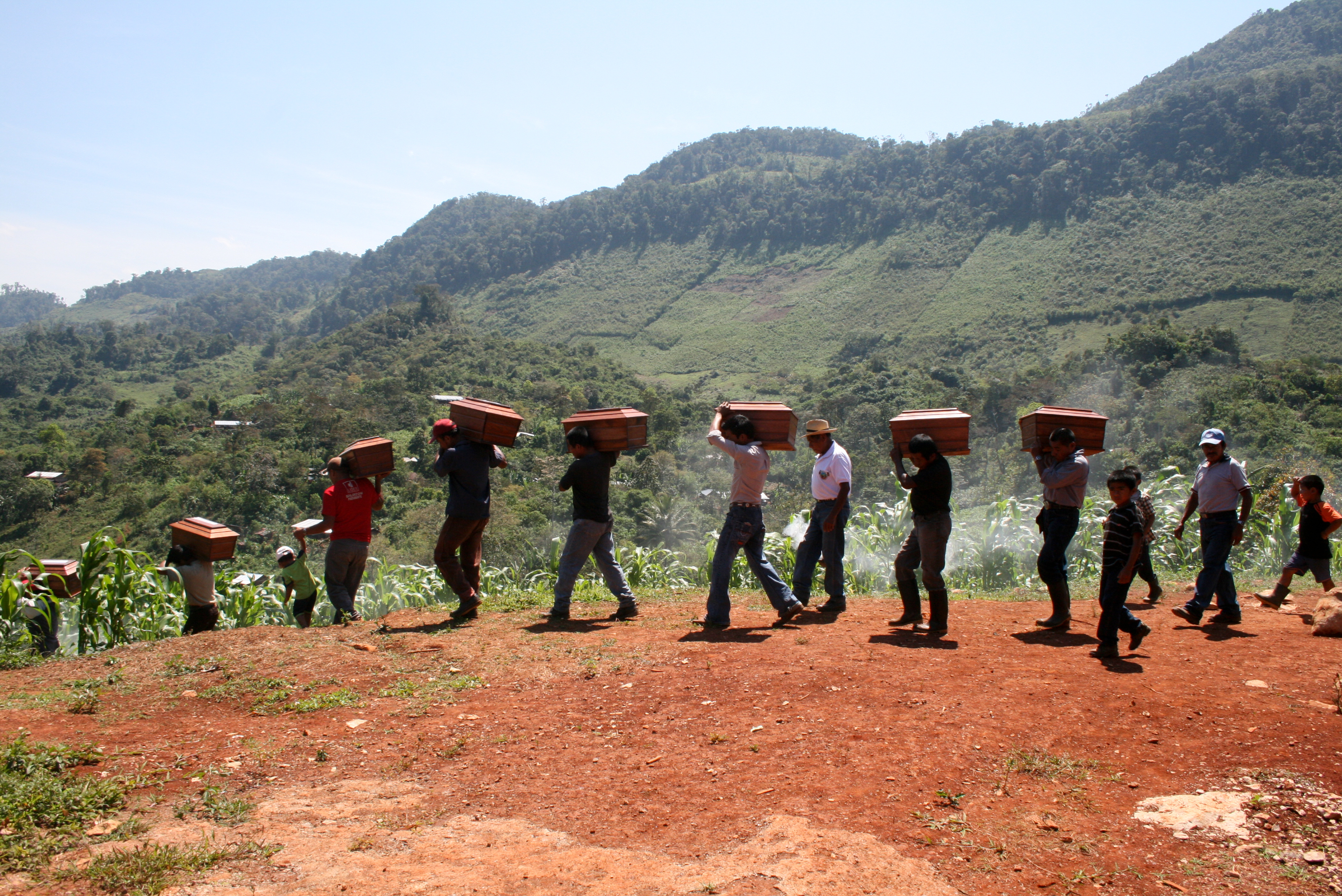
Mayan men carrying the remains of their families after an exhumation in Alta Verapaz department, Guatemala.

In 1999, paramilitary Candido Noriega was sentenced to 50 years for his role in the deaths of dozens whilst employed by the Guatemalan army.

In August 2009, a court in Chimaltenango sentenced Felipe Cusanero, a local farmer, who was part of a network of paramilitaries who gave information about suspected leftists living in their villages to the army during Guatemala's counterinsurgency campaign, to 150 years in prison for his part in the disappearance of half a dozen indigenous members of a Mayan farming community over the two-year period of 1982–1984. He was the first person to ever be convicted for carrying out acts of forced disappearance during the Civil War. He appeared before three judges to face his sentence. He received a 25-year prison sentence for each of his victims. It was hailed as a "landmark" sentence. Hilarion López, the father of one of the victims, said: "We weren't looking for vengeance but for the truth and justice". The families have called on Cusanero to tell them where their bodies are. Cusanero was photographed being carried away by police afterwards. By August 2011, four former officers from the Guatemalan Special Forces (Kaibiles) were sentenced to 6,060 years in prison each for their involvement in the Dos Erres Massacre. In March 2011, a fifth former soldier, Pedro Pimentel Rios, was also sentenced to 6,060 years (after having been extradited from the United States) for his role in Dos Erres.

In March 2013, the trial against former president and dictator Jose Efrain Ríos Montt for the genocide of at least 1,771 members of the Maya Ixils began. The footage from Pamela Yates’ 1983 documentary When the Mountains Tremble, about the war between the Guatemalan Military and the Mayan Indigenous population of Guatemala, was used as forensic evidence in the genocide case against Jose Efrain Ríos Montt. On 10 May 2013, Ríos Montt was convicted of genocide and crimes against humanity. He was sentenced to 80 years in prison (50 for genocide and 30 years for crimes against humanity). He is the first former head of state to be convicted of genocide by a court in his own country. However, ten days later, the Constitutional Court of Guatemala overturned the verdict. On 7 July 2015, Ríos Montt was declared mentally unfit to stand trial for committing genocide.

In 2015, there was a populist uprising that eventually led to President Otto Pérez Molina's resignation and imprisonment. Before entering politics in the 1990s, he served as Director of Military Intelligence, Presidential Chief of Staff, and chief representative of the military for the Guatemalan Peace Accords. On 21 August 2015, Guatemalan prosecutors presented evidence of Pérez's involvement in the corruption ring and on 1 September, congress voted to take away his immunity, which prompted his resignation from presidency the next day. On 3 September 2015, he was arrested.

In May 2018, Benedicto Lucas García, former chief of military intelligence Manuel Antonio Callejas y Callejas, and Military Zone No. 17 senior officers Francisco Luis Gordillo Martínez and Hugo Ramiro Zaldaña Rojas were found guilty of not only crimes against humanity, but also aggravated sexual violation related to the Molina Theissen case. The case, which saw convictions for the forced disappearance of her teenage brother, was the first court judgement in Guatemala genocide trials which involved the forced disappearance of a child. Three of the officials, including both Lucas García and Callejas y Callejas, received a sentence of 58 years in prison, while Luis Gordillo received a 33-year prison sentence. In November 2019, Lucas García, Callejas y Callejas and retired Colonel César Octavio Noguera Argueta received additional criminal charges related to the Maya Ixil genocide. Luis Enrique Mendoza García, who was third in command of the Guatemalan army during the government of Efraín Ríos Montt, would be charged genocide and crimes against humanity against the Maya Ixil population soon afterwards as well. César Octavio Noguera Argueta died in November 2020 while still being prosecuted with his two co-defendants.

In January 2022, five former paramilitary officers of the pro-government Civil Self-Defense Patrols militia were sentenced to 30 years in prison for the rape of several Indigenous women during the time the genocide progressed in the early 1980s.

== Commemoration ==
The R.E.M. song "Flowers of Guatemala" is a commemoration of the genocide.

A cross statue was built to commemorate the genocide in Dos Erres.

== See also ==
- Central American crisis
- 1982 Guatemalan coup d'état
- Guatemalan Civil War
- History of Guatemala
- Human rights in Guatemala
- John Gordon Mein
- Politics of Guatemala
- Guatemala National Police Archives
- Nicaraguan Revolution
- Salvadoran Civil War
- Colombian Armed Conflict
- Internal conflict in Peru
- List of civil wars
- List of conflicts in Central America
- List of conflicts in North America
- List of conflicts in South America
- List of ethnic cleansing campaigns
- List of genocides
- List of wars by death toll
- MINUGUA: a United Nations verification/peacekeeping mission in Guatemala, 1994–2004
- Anti-communist mass killings
- Denial of atrocities against Indigenous peoples
- Ethnic cleansing
- Ethnocide
- Rwandan Genocide
- Gaza Genocide
- Genocide denial
- Genocide recognition politics
- Genocides in history (1946 to 1999)
- Genocide of indigenous peoples#Guatemala
- United States atrocity crimes
- La Llorona (film)
- 500 Years (film)
- When the Mountains Tremble
- The Evil That Men Do (film)
