= Ixil =

Ixil may refer to

- Ixil language, a Mayan language spoken in Guatemala
- Ixil people, an indigenous Maya people in El Quiché Department, Guatemala
- Ixil Community, a region encompassing three Ixil villages in the western Guatemalan highlands
- Ixil Municipality, a town in Yucatán, Mexico
