= Xexocom =

- Hamlet
- Location of Xexocom in Guatemala
- Coordinates: 15.444903°N 91.201072°W
- Country: Guatemala
- Department: El Quiché
- Municipality: Nebaj

Population
  - Ethnicities: Ixil Kʼicheʼ
  - Languages: Kʼicheʼ

Xexocom, sometimes erroneously spelled Xexecom, is a hamlet in the municipality of Nebaj, in the Quiché Department of Guatemala. It is located just below the Guatemalan Altiplano and has roughly 25 households. The hamlet has a school house.
