= Nebaj =

Archeological site in Guatemala

Coordinates: 15°24′30″N 91°8′50″W

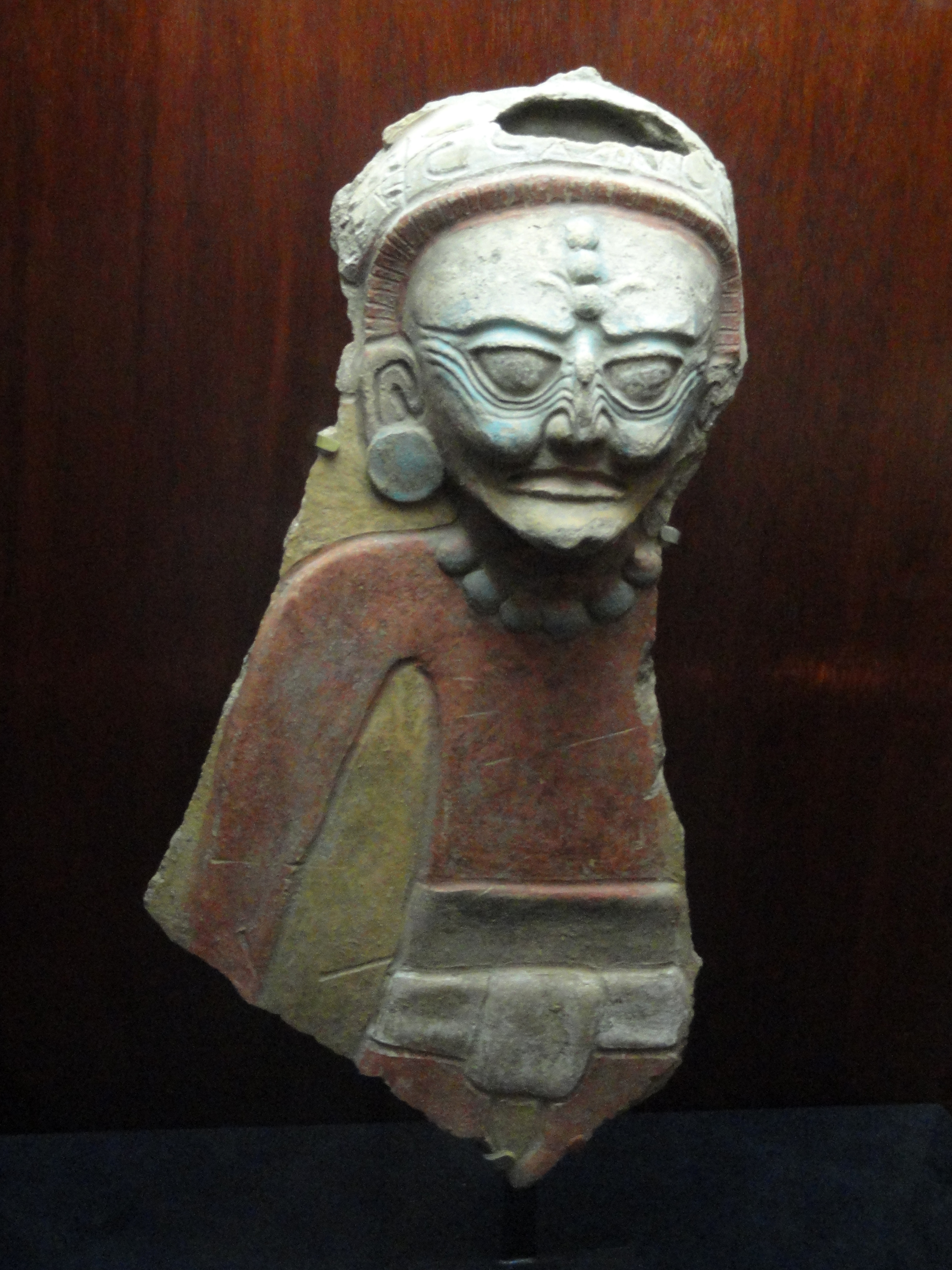
Nebaj Polychrome Fragment of Old Fire God, 900-1200 AD, Maya, Guatemala, Houston Museum of Natural Science

Nebaj is an archaeological site of the pre-Columbian Maya civilization, located in the western Guatemala highlands near the Ixil village of Santa María Nebaj. What is now known as the Fenton Vase was excavated from this site. It is now held in the British Museum.

Archaeologically, Nebaj served as a major Classic period highland trading and artistic center within the Ixil region, renowned for its distinct polychrome ceramic style and elaborate jadeite carvings indicating extensive trade networks with the Petén lowlands.

== Villages ==
- Xexocom
