= Ixil Community =

Ixil Triangle Triángulo ixil (Spanish)
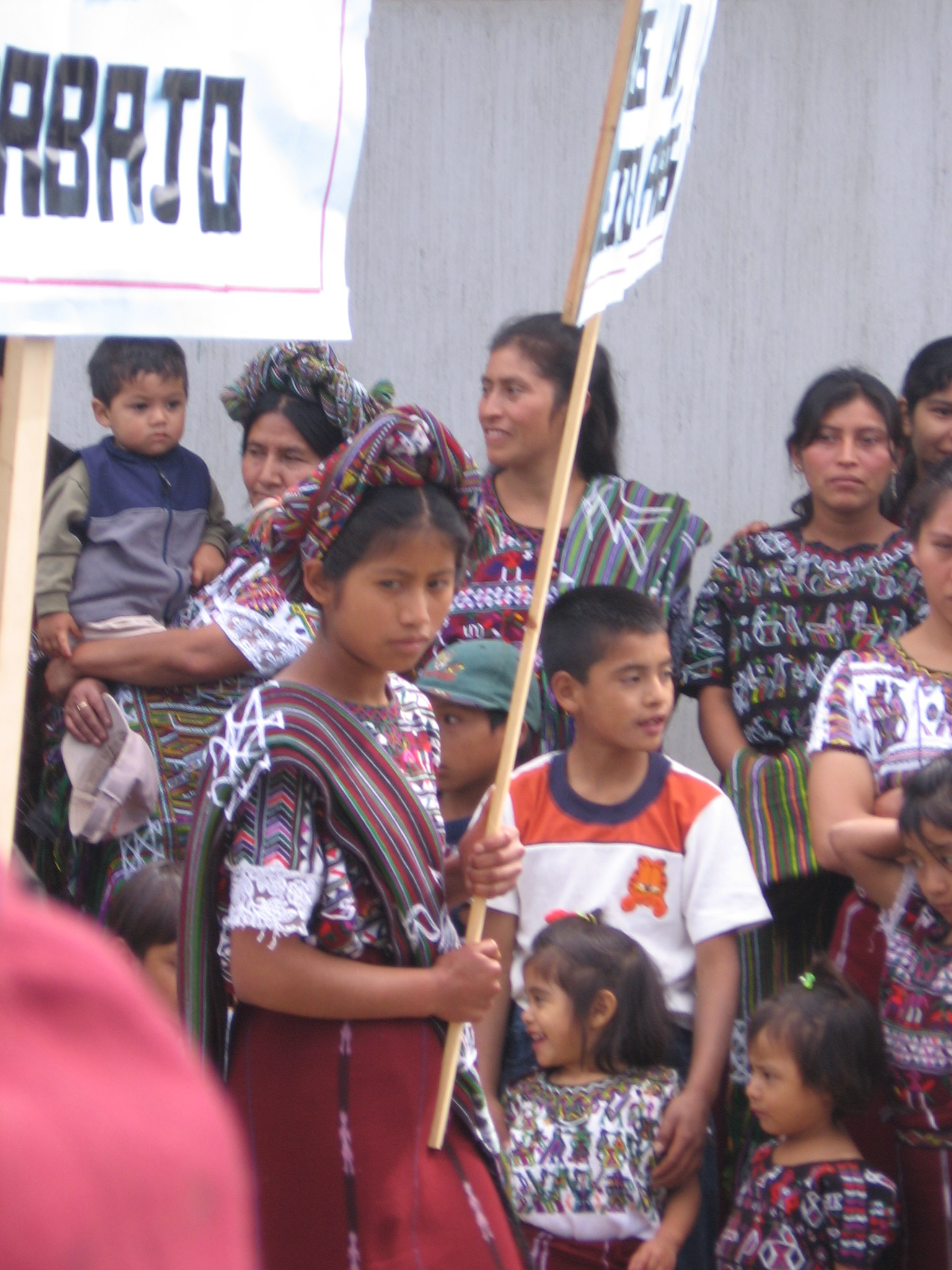
- Celebrations at Santa María Nebaj, 2005

- Communities that form the Ixil Triangle: 1. Nebaj; 2. San Juan Cotzal; 3. Chajul
- Country: Guatemala
- Department: Quiché

Population (2018)
  - Total: 150,876
- Languages: Spanish, Ixil, Quiché

The Ixil Community is a name given to three neighbouring towns in the Quiché department in the western highlands of Guatemala. These towns are Santa María Nebaj, San Juan Cotzal, and San Gaspar Chajul. The area's population is predominantly of Ixil descent. When viewed on a map, the three Ixil towns appear to form a triangle, because of this, the Guatemalan military used the term Ixil Triangle when planning its campaigns in this region. Although the term "Ixil Triangle" has been used in some popular handbooks, most people in the region, as well as scholars and indigenous rights activists, avoid using this term as it reproduces the military "gaze", and instead prefer "Ixil region" or "Ixil community."

== Culture ==
Due to its location in the Cuchumatanes mountains, the Ixil Community has remained isolated from the rest of the world. Its people have therefore maintained their traditional culture — free from influences of the outside world. Although the introduction modern western media is rapidly eroding the culture as young men and women look North for economic prosperity and abandonment of the culture and language are present problems. Most men are farmers, and most women are weavers.

Their diet primarily consists of maize based products. Small round tortillas or corn dumplings known as tamalitos are a staple at almost every meal. This love of corn is ingrained in the culture, so much so that many of the Ixil refer to themselves as "men of corn". Stating that the first humans were rolled from masa or ground up maize.

Other foods commonly eaten are boxbol, which are small corn dumplings steamed in squash leaves covered in chili sauce.

Malanga, "güisquil" (pronounced "wiskil": or chayote), beans, squash, and eggs make up the rest of their typical diet.

The people of the Ixil community primarily speak the Ixil language. Some villagers speak Spanish as a secondary language.

== Turmoil during civil war ==
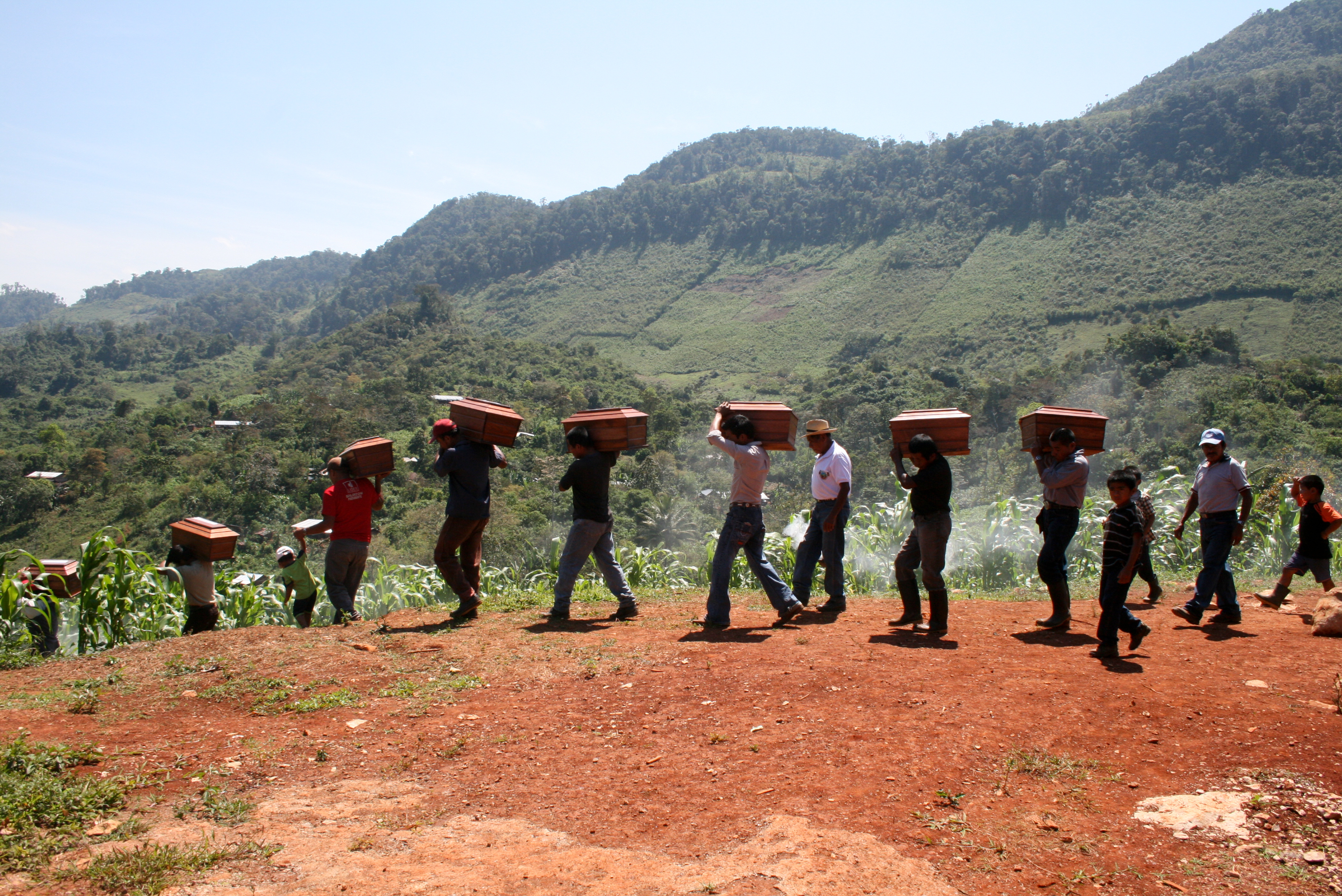
Ixil people carrying their loved one's remains after an exhumation in the Ixil Triangle in February 2012.

During the Guatemalan Civil War, the Guerrilla Army of the Poor (EGP) used the surrounding mountains as a base of operations. The Guatemalan Army pursued a scorched-earth policy to destroy villages. The villagers of the Ixil Community were caught in the crossfire, and thousands of civilians were killed, tortured, or missing.

The army's campaign against civilians in this region may have been motivated partially by a desire "to weaken and eventually eradicate Maya culture." Villagers slowly learned not to wear their traditional Maya clothing, because its distinctive appearance made them easy targets for soldiers.
