= Ixil language =

Mayan language of Mexico and Guatemala

Ixil
- Ixhil
- Pronunciation: [iʂil]
- Native to: Guatemala, Mexico
- Region: Quiché Department; Campeche, Quintana Roo
- Ethnicity: 133,329 Ixil (2019 census)
- Native speakers: 120,000 (2019 census)
- Language family: Mayan: Core Mayan; Eastern–Western Mayan; Eastern Mayan; Greater Mamean; Ixilan; Ixil
- Dialects: Chajuleño; Nebajeño
- Writing system: Latin

Official status
- Recognised minority language in: Mexico; Guatemala
- Regulated by: Instituto Nacional de Lenguas Indígenas; Academia de Lenguas Mayas de Guatemala

Language codes
- ISO 639-3: ixl
- Glottolog: ixil1251
- ELP: Ixil

History and genealogy of the Mayan languages. Ixil is part of the Mamean subfamily, colored indigo in this image.

Ixil (Ixhil) is a Mayan language spoken in Mexico and Guatemala. It is the primary language of the Ixil people, which mainly comprises the three towns of San Juan Cotzal, Santa María Nebaj, and San Gaspar Chajul in the Guatemalan highlands and numerous towns in the states of Campeche and Quintana Roo in southeast México. There is also an Ixil speaking migrant population in Guatemala City, Mexico City and the United States. Although there are slight differences in vocabulary in the dialects spoken by people in the three main Guatemalan Ixil towns, they are all mutually intelligible and should be considered dialects of a single language. According to historical linguistic studies, Ixil emerged as a separate language sometime around the year 500 AD.

== Distribution ==
Ixil is spoken in Mexico in some municipalities of the states of Campeche and Quintana Roo. In the state of Campeche is spoken in the communities of Los Laureles and Quetzal-Edzná from the Campeche municipality and in Maya Tecún in Champotón municipality, while in Quintana Roo is spoken in the towns of Maya Balam and Kuchumatán, Bacalar municipality.

In Guatemala, the municipalities where Ixil is spoken the most are San Gaspar Chajul, San Juan Cotzal and Santa María Nebaj, Quiché department.

== Phonology ==
Ixil vowels
	Front	Central	Back
High	i iː		u uː
Close-mid	e eː		o oː
Open		a aː	

Ixil consonants (Nebaj dialect)
		Labial	Alveolar		Post- alveolar	Retroflex	Palatal	Velar	Uvular	Glottal
Nasal		m ⟨m⟩	n ⟨n⟩							
Plosive/ Affricate	plain	p ⟨p⟩	t ⟨t⟩	t͡s ⟨tz⟩	t͡ɕ ⟨ch⟩	ʈ͡ʂ ⟨tx⟩		k ⟨k⟩	q ⟨q⟩	ʔ ⟨'⟩
Plosive/ Affricate	glottalized	ɓ ⟨bʼ⟩	tʼ ⟨tʼ⟩	t͡sʼ ⟨tzʼ⟩	t͡ɕʼ ⟨chʼ⟩	ʈ͡ʂʼ ⟨txʼ⟩		kʼ ⟨kʼ⟩	qʼ ⟨qʼ⟩	ʔ ⟨'⟩
Fricative		β ~ v ⟨v⟩	s ⟨s⟩		ɕ ⟨xh⟩	ʂ ⟨x⟩			χ ⟨j⟩	
Flap			ɾ ⟨r⟩							
Approximant		(w ⟨v⟩)	l ⟨l⟩				j ⟨y⟩			

== Grammar ==
Ixil pronominals are discerned between ergative ones and absolutive ones. A notable feature of the language's grammar is its ambiguity in discerning reflexive from reciprocal pronouns.

== Lexicon ==
Ixil has some loanwords from Chʼolan and Qʼanjobalan languages.

=== Vocabulary ===
English	Ixil
One	Wa'l
Two	Ka'wa'l
Three	Oxhwal
Man	Winaq
Woman	Ixoq
Dog	Tx'i'
Sun	Q'ij
Moon	Ich'
Water	Ja
Deer	Che
Jaguar	B'alam
Monkey	K'oy
Rabbit	Umul
Mouse	Ch'o
Bird	Tz'ikyin
Fish	Txay
Bee	Uskab
Black	Q'eq
White	Saq
Red	Kaq
Yellow	Q'an
Green	Cha'x
Blue	Cha'x

== See also ==
- Ergative–absolutive alignment

== Bibliography ==
- Asicona Ramírez, Lucas, Domingo Méndez Rivera, Rodrigo Domingo Xinic Bop. 1998. Diccionario Ixil de San Gaspar Chajul. La Antigua Guatemala: Proyecto Linguistico Francisco Marroquín.
- Ayres, Glenn Thompson (1991). La Gramática Ixil. La Antigua Guatemala: CIRMA.
- Cedillo Chel, Antonio, Juan Ramírez. 1999. Diccionario del idioma ixil de Santa María Nebaj. La Antigua Guatemala: Proyecto Linguistico Francisco Marroquín.
- England, Nora C. 1994. Ukutaʼmiil Ramaqʼiil Utzijobʼaal ri Mayaʼ Amaaqʼ: Autonomia de los Idiomas Mayas: Historia e identidad. (2nd ed.). Guatemala City: Cholsamaj.
- Maximiliano Poma S., Tabita J.T. de la Cruz, Manuel Caba Caba et al. 1996. Gramática del Idioma Ixil. La Antigua Guatemala: Proyecto Linguistico Francisco Marroquín.
- Oxlajuuj Keej Mayaʼ Ajtzʼiibʼ (OKMA). 1993. Mayaʼ chiiʼ. Los idiomas Mayas de Guatemala. Guatemala City: Cholsamaj.
- Programa de Rescate Cultural Maya-Ixil. 1995. Aqʼbʼal Eluʼl Yol Vatzsaj: Diccionario Ixil. Guatemala City: Cholsamaj.
