= Santa María Nebaj =

Santa María Nebaj Nebaj
- Municipality
- The central plaza of Nebaj, 2006

- Location in Guatemala
- Coordinates: 15°24′30″N 91°8′50″W
- Country: Guatemala
- Department: El Quiché
- Municipality: Santa María Nebaj

Government
  - Type: Municipal
  - Mayor (2016-2020): José Adolfo Quezada Valdez (LIDER)

Area
  - Municipality: 215 sq mi (558 km^{2})
- Elevation: 6,200 ft (1,900 m)

Population (Census 2018)
  - Municipality: 72,686
  - Density: 337/sq mi (130/km^{2})
  - Urban: 31,935
  - Ethnicities: Ixil K'iche' Ladino
  - Religions: Eastern Orthodoxy or Oriental Orthodoxy Evangelicalism (then recent historically) Roman Catholicism Maya
- Climate: Cfb

Santa María Nebaj (Spanish pronunciation: [neˈβax]; usually abbreviated to Nebaj) is a town and municipality in the Guatemalan department of El Quiché. Santa María Nebaj is part of the Ixil Community, along with San Juan Cotzal and San Gaspar Chajul. Native residents speak the Mayan Ixil language.

The community is named in part for Nebaj, a pre-Columbian archaeological site of the Maya civilization.

== History ==
=== Spanish conquest ===
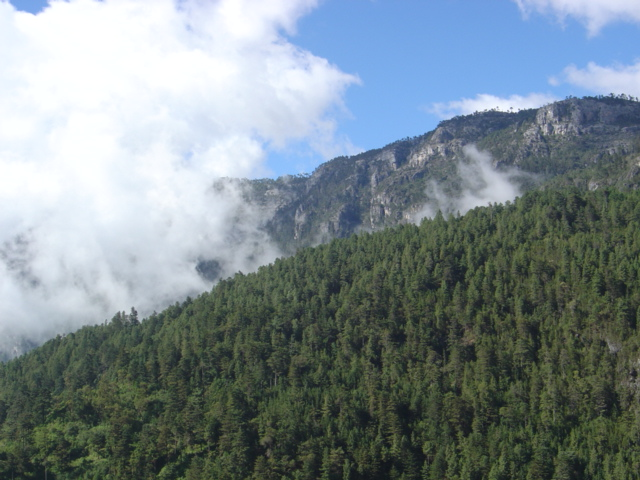
The difficult terrain and remoteness of the Cuchumatanes made their conquest difficult.

In the ten years after the fall of Zaculeu, various Spanish expeditions crossed into the Sierra de los Cuchumatanes and engaged in the gradual and complex conquest of the Chuj and Q'anjob'al peoples. The Spanish hoped to extract gold, silver and other riches from the mountains, but their remoteness, the difficult terrain, and relatively low population made the conquest and exploitation of this area extremely difficult.

The population of the Cuchumatanes is estimated to have been 260,000 before European contact. By the time the Spanish arrived in the region, the Mayans had already suffered high mortality from the Old World infectious diseases brought by colonists and spread by traders. Their population had declined to 150,000, with accompanying social disruption to many communities from the epidemics of disease.

After the western portion of the Cuchumatanes fell to the Spanish, the Ixil and Uspantek Maya were sufficiently isolated to evade immediate Spanish attention. The Uspantek and the Ixil were allies. In 1529, four years after the Spanish conquest of Huehuetenango, Uspantek warriors were harassing Spanish forces, and Uspantán was trying to foment rebellion among the K'iche'. Uspantek activity became sufficiently troublesome that the Spanish decided that military action was necessary.

Gaspar Arias, magistrate of Guatemala, penetrated the eastern Cuchumatanes with sixty Spanish infantry and three hundred allied indigenous warriors. By early September he had imposed temporary Spanish authority over the Ixil towns of Chajul and Nebaj. As the Spanish army marched east toward Uspantán; Arias received notice that the acting governor of Guatemala, Francisco de Orduña, had deposed him as magistrate. Arias handed command over to the inexperienced Pedro de Olmos and returned to confront de Orduña. Although his officers advised against it, Olmos launched a full-scale frontal assault on Uspantán. As soon as the Spanish began their assault, they were attacked from the rear by more than two thousand Uspantek warriors. The Spanish forces were routed with heavy losses; many of their indigenous allies were slain, and many more were captured alive by the Uspantek warriors. They sacrificed the enemies on the altar of their deity Exbalamquen. The survivors fought their way back to the Spanish garrison at Q'umarkaj.

A year later Francisco de Castellanos set out from Santiago de los Caballeros de Guatemala (by now relocated to Ciudad Vieja) on another expedition against the Ixil and Uspantek. He led eight corporals, thirty-two cavalry, forty Spanish infantry, and several hundred allied indigenous warriors. The expedition rested at Chichicastenango and recruited further forces before marching seven leagues northward to Sacapulas and climbing the steep southern slopes of the Cuchumatanes. On the upper slopes, these forces clashed with a force of between four and five thousand Ixil warriors from Nebaj and nearby settlements. A lengthy battle followed, during which the Spanish cavalry outflanked the Ixil army and forced them to retreat to their mountaintop fortress at Nebaj. The Spanish force besieged the city, and their indigenous allies managed to scale the walls, penetrate the stronghold and set it on fire. Many defending Ixil warriors withdrew to fight the fire, which allowed the Spanish to storm the entrance and break the defences.

The victorious Spanish rounded up the surviving defenders, and the next day Castellanos ordered them to be branded as slaves as punishment for their resistance. After learning of this battle, the inhabitants of Chajul capitulated to the Spanish. The Spanish continued east towards Uspantán, where they found it defended by ten thousand warriors, including forces from Cotzal, Cunén, Sacapulas and Verapaz.

Although much outnumbered, the advantages of the Spanish cavalry and the firearms of the infantry enabled them to defeat the Mayans. The Spanish overran Uspantán and branded all surviving warriors as slaves. The surrounding towns also surrendered, and December 1530 marked the end of the military stage of the conquest of the Cuchumatanes.

The Spanish divided the Ixil people among four towns: Nebaj, Cotzal, Chajul and Ilom.

=== 20th century: Guatemala Civil War ===
In 1982, in the remote Guatemalan highlands, where the military classified those most isolated as being more accessible to the guerrillas, it identified many villages and communities as "red" and targeted them for annihilation. This was especially true in Quiche Department, where the army had a well-documented belief from the Benedicto Lucas period that the entire indigenous population of the Ixil area was pro-EGP. A major part of Rios Montt's pacification strategy in El Quiche was "Operation Sofia," which began on July 8, 1982 on orders from Army Chief of Staff Héctor Mario López Fuentes. "Operation Sofia" was planned and executed by the 1st Battalion of the Guatemalan Airborne Troops with the mission to "exterminate the subversive elements in the area - Quiché."

The majority of the Ixil population were subsequently forced into a polarized situation in which neutrality was viewed with suspicion by both the military and left-wing insurgents. Leading to a situation described as "being caught between two fires" by Ixil civilians.

The CIIDH database documented 18,000 killings by government forces in the year 1982. In April 1982 alone (General Efraín Ríos Montt's first full month in office), the military committed 3,330 documented killings, a rate of approximately 111 per day. Historians and analysts estimate the total death toll could exceed this number by the tens of thousands. Some sources estimate a death toll of up to 75,000 during the Rios Montt period, mostly within the first eight months between April and November 1982.

== Climate ==
Nebaj has a subtropical highland climate (Köppen: Cwb).

Climate data for Nebaj (1991–2020)
Month	Jan	Feb	Mar	Apr	May	Jun	Jul	Aug	Sep	Oct	Nov	Dec	Year
Record high °C (°F)	27.1 (80.8)	30.5 (86.9)	33.3 (91.9)	33.4 (92.1)	30.4 (86.7)	30.0 (86.0)	28.2 (82.8)	31.2 (88.2)	26.9 (80.4)	27.9 (82.2)	27.9 (82.2)	28.6 (83.5)	33.4 (92.1)
Mean daily maximum °C (°F)	20.2 (68.4)	21.6 (70.9)	23.5 (74.3)	25.0 (77.0)	24.4 (75.9)	23.3 (73.9)	22.3 (72.1)	22.6 (72.7)	22.6 (72.7)	21.6 (70.9)	20.1 (68.2)	20.1 (68.2)	22.3 (72.1)
Daily mean °C (°F)	14.1 (57.4)	14.9 (58.8)	16.1 (61.0)	17.7 (63.9)	17.8 (64.0)	17.6 (63.7)	16.9 (62.4)	17.0 (62.6)	17.1 (62.8)	16.4 (61.5)	14.9 (58.8)	14.4 (57.9)	16.2 (61.2)
Mean daily minimum °C (°F)	7.2 (45.0)	7.3 (45.1)	8.1 (46.6)	9.9 (49.8)	11.4 (52.5)	12.4 (54.3)	11.2 (52.2)	11.2 (52.2)	11.7 (53.1)	11.3 (52.3)	9.2 (48.6)	7.9 (46.2)	9.9 (49.8)
Record low °C (°F)	−0.6 (30.9)	−3.1 (26.4)	−1.0 (30.2)	−3.1 (26.4)	1.0 (33.8)	3.7 (38.7)	3.7 (38.7)	4.9 (40.8)	−2.2 (28.0)	2.2 (36.0)	−0.6 (30.9)	−0.8 (30.6)	−3.1 (26.4)
Average precipitation mm (inches)	36.7 (1.44)	21.9 (0.86)	34.1 (1.34)	72.3 (2.85)	154.2 (6.07)	341.2 (13.43)	278.6 (10.97)	313.6 (12.35)	351.5 (13.84)	227.2 (8.94)	111.8 (4.40)	49.5 (1.95)	1,992.6 (78.45)
Average precipitation days (≥ 1.0 mm)	7.2	5.0	5.5	7.9	13.4	23.9	22.9	22.9	24.3	18.6	11.5	8.8	171.9
Source: NOAA

== Geographic location ==
Santa María Nebaj is at the northern side of Quiché Department, in the region known as Franja Transversal del Norte.

== See also ==
- List of places in Guatemala

== Notes and references ==
=== Bibliography ===
- Limón Aguirre, Fernando (2008). La ciudadanía del pueblo chuj en México: Una dialéctica negativa de identidades (PDF) (in Spanish). San Cristóbal de Las Casas, México: El Colegio de la Frontera Sur – Unidad San Cristóbal de Las Casas. Archived from the original (PDF) on 22 July 2012.
- Lovell, W. George (2000). "The Highland Maya". In Richard E.W. Adams; Murdo J. Macleod (eds.). The Cambridge History of the Native Peoples of the Americas, Vol. II: Mesoamerica, part 2. Cambridge, UK: Cambridge University Press. pp. 392–444. ISBN 0-521-65204-9. OCLC 33359444.
- — (2005). Conquest and Survival in Colonial Guatemala: A Historical Geography of the Cuchumatán Highlands, 1500-1821 (3rd ed.). Montreal, Canadá: McGill-Queen's University Press. ISBN 0-7735-2741-9. OCLC 58051691.
- Schirmer, Jennifer (1988). The Guatemalan Military Project: A Violence Called Democracy. Philadelphia, PA: University of Pennsylvania Press. ISBN 0-8122-3325-5.
