= Ixil Municipality =

Municipality in the Mexican state of Yucatán

Ixil
- Municipality
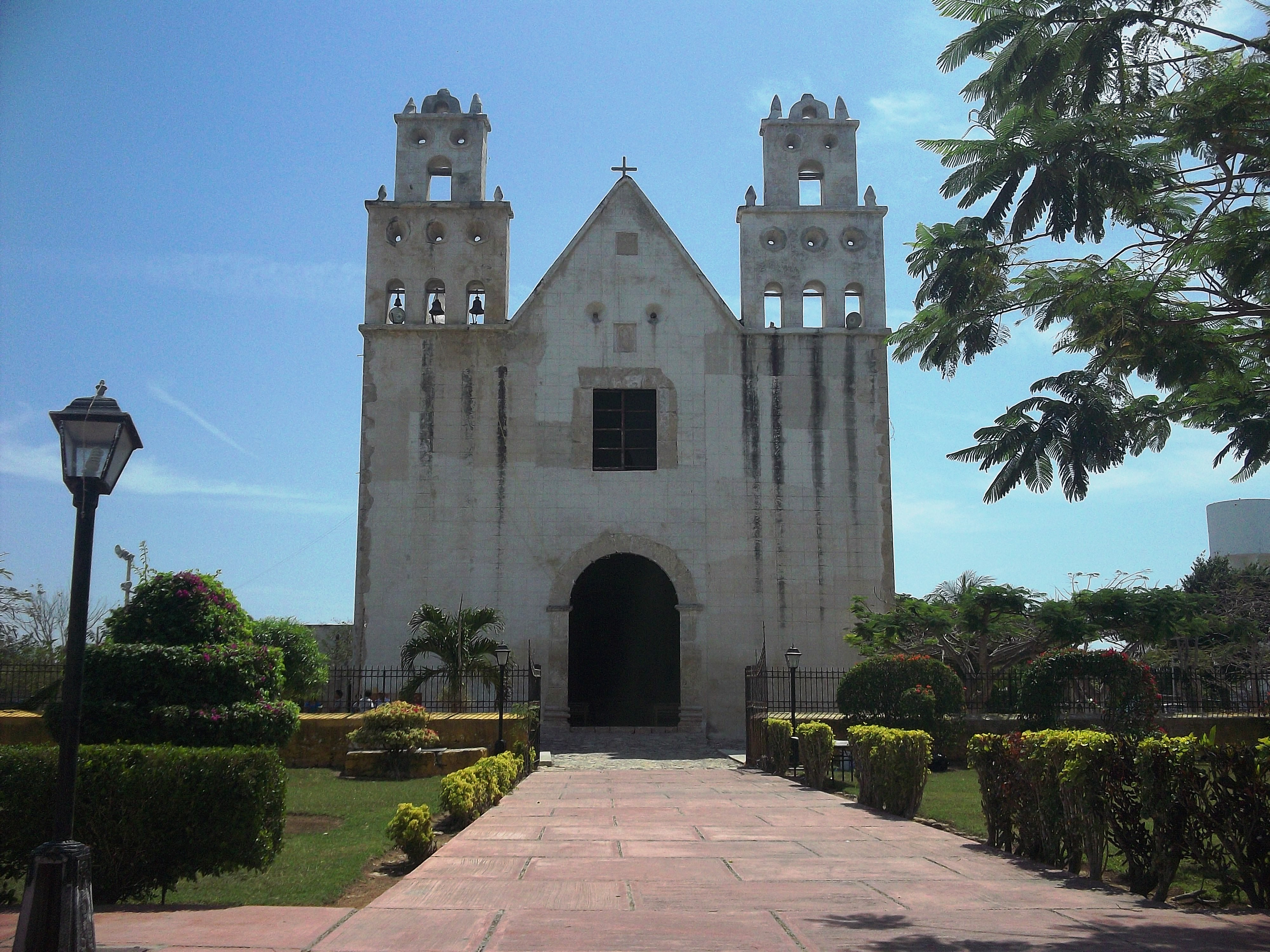
- Church at Ixil, Yucatán

- Region 2 Noroeste #039

- Location of the Municipality in Mexico
- Coordinates: 21°09′08″N 89°28′56″W
- Country: Mexico
- State: Yucatán

Government
  - Type: 2012–2015
  - Municipal President: José Efrain Aguilar Moguel

Area
  - Total: 134.13 km^{2} (51.79 sq mi)
- Elevation: 7 m (23 ft)

Population (2010)
  - Total: 3,803
- Time zone: UTC-6 (Central Standard Time)
- INEGI Code: 009
- Major Airport: Merida (Manuel Crescencio Rejón) International Airport
- IATA Code: MID
- ICAO Code: MMMD

Ixil Municipality ([iˈʃil], in the Yucatec Maya Language: “place of bristles”) is a municipality in the Mexican state of Yucatán containing 134.13 km^{2} of land and located roughly 25 km north of the city of Mérida.

== History ==
In ancient times, the area was part of the chieftainship of Ceh Pech until the conquest. At colonization, Ixil became part of the encomienda system.

In 1821, Yucatán was declared independent of the Spanish Crown. In 1905, Ixil belonged to the Coastal region headquartered in Izamal. In 1850, Ixil withdrew from the coastal region and became aligned with Tixkokob. In 1918, it became head of its own municipality and was separated from Tixkokob.

== Governance ==
The municipal president is elected for a term of three years. The president appoints Councilpersons to serve on the board for three year terms, as the Secretary and councilors of public works, security, cemeteries, nomenclature, parks and public gardens, street lighting and public health.

The Municipal Council administers the business of the municipality. It is responsible for budgeting and expenditures and producing all required reports for all branches of the municipal administration. Annually it determines educational standards for schools.

The Police Commissioners ensure public order and safety. They are tasked with enforcing regulations, distributing materials and administering rulings of general compliance issued by the council.

== Communities ==
The head of the municipality is Ixil, Yucatán. Five haciendas are part of the municipality including Concepción, Joaquín, Saclum, San José de Ceballos, and X-Luch. The largest populated areas are shown below:

Community	Population
Entire Municipality (2010)	3,803
El Faro	24 in 2005
Ixil	3538 in 2005

== Local festivals ==
Every year on 13 June the feast of the town's patron saint, Saint Barnabas, is celebrated.

== Tourist attractions ==
- Church of St. Barnabas
- Archeological sites "Las Trincheras"

== Notable people ==
- José Tec Poot, anthropologist who was killed in the 1985 Mexico City earthquake
