= Mamean languages =

Branch of Mayan languages

Mamean
- Greater Mamean
- Geographic distribution: Mesoamerica
- Linguistic classification: Mayan: Core Mayan; Eastern–Western Mayan; Eastern Mayan; Mamean
- Subdivisions: Mamean proper; Ixilan

Language codes
- Glottolog: grea1277

The (Greater) Mamean family is a branch of the Eastern Mayan language group. Mamean languages include Aguacateco, Ixil, Mam, Tacaneco, and Tektiteco (Teko).

== Languages ==
- Mamean proper: Mam (478,000 speakers), Tektiteko (5,000 speakers)
- Ixilan: Ixil (135,000 speakers), Awakatek (11,607 speakers)

Genealogy of Mayan languages.

== Phonology ==
=== Vowels ===
Vowels system of Mamean languages
Letter	Mam (Todos Santos)	Tektiteko (Tectitán)	Awakatek (Aguacatán)	Ixil (Chajul)
i	/ɪ/	/i/	/ɪ/	/ɪ/
ii	/iː/	/iː/	/iː/	/iː/
u	/ɯ/	/u/	/ɯ/	/ɯ/
uu	/u͍ː/	/yː/	/ʉː/	/yː/
e	/ɛ/	/e/	/e̞/	/ɛ/
ee	/eː/	/eː/	/eː/	/eː/
o	/ɤ̞/	/o/	/ɤ/	/ɔ/
oo	/o͍ː/	/øː/	/ɵː/	/oː/
a	/a/	/a/	/ä/	/a/
aa	/ɑ͍ː/	/aː/	/ɐː/	/ɐː/

=== Consonants ===
Consonant inventory of the Mamean languages
Letter	Mam (Todos Santos)	Tektiteko (Tectitán)	Awakatek (Aguacatán)	Ixil (Chajul)
p	/pʰ~ɸʰ/	/p̪ʰ/	/pʰ~ɸʰ/	/pʰ/
pʼ	N/A	N/A	/pʼ/	N/A
b	/β/	N/A	N/A	N/A
bʼ	/ɓ/	/ɓ/	/ɓ/	/ɓ/
m	/m/	/m/	/m/	/m/
w	/ʋ, ʍ, f/	/v, ʍ, f/	/v, w/	/v, f/
t	/tʰ/	/tʰ/	/tʰ/	/tʰ/
tʼ	/tʼ, ɗ/	/tʼ/	/tʼ, ɗ/	/tʼ/
n	/n~ŋ/	/n~ŋ/	/n~ɴ/	/n~ŋʰ/
s	/s, z/	/s/	/s/	/sʰ, z/
tz	/tsʰ/	/tsʰ/	/tsʰ/	/tsʰ/
tzʼ	/tsʼ/	/tsʼ/	/tsʼ/	/tsʼ/
r	/ɾ~r/	/ɾ/	/ɾ/	/ɾ/
l	/l, ɹ, ɬ/	/l, ɬ/	/l, ɬ/	/l, ɹ, ɬʰ/
xh	/ʃʰ, ɕʰ/	/ʃʰ/	/ɕʰ/	/ɕʰ~ʃʰ/
ch	/tʃʰ, tɕʰ/	/tʃʰ/	/tɕʰ/	/tɕʰ/
chʼ	/tʃʼ, tɕʼ/	/tʃʼ/	/tɕʼ/	/tɕʼ/
x	/ʐ, ʂ/	/ʂ, ʑ/	/ʂ, ʐ/	/ʐ, ʂ/
tx	/ʈʂʰ/	/ʈʂʰ/	/ʈʂʰ/	/ʈʂʰ/
txʼ	/ʈʂʼ/	/ʈʂʼ/	/ʈʂʼ/	/ʈʂʼ/
y	/j/	/j/	/j/	/j~ʝ/
k	/kʰ/	/kʰ/	/kʰ/	/kʰ/
kʼ	/kʼ/	/kʼ/	/kʼ~ɠ/	/kʼ/
nh	N/A	/ŋ/	/ŋ/	/ŋʰ/
ky	/kʲ, kɕʲ/	/kʲʰ/	/kʲ/	/kʰʲ~kç/
kyʼ	/kʼʲ~kɕʼ/	/kʼʲʰ/	/ɠʲ/	/kʰʲʼ, kʼʝ/
q	/qʰ/	/qʰ/	/qʰ/	/qʰ/
qʼ	/ʛ/	/qʼ, ʛ/	/ʛ/	/ɢʼ/
j	/χʰ, ʁ/	/χ/	/χ/	/χʰ/
h	N/A	N/A	/ʜ, h/	N/A

See Mayan languages#Mamean for details.
