= Ixil people =

Mayan ethnic group in Central America

Ixil
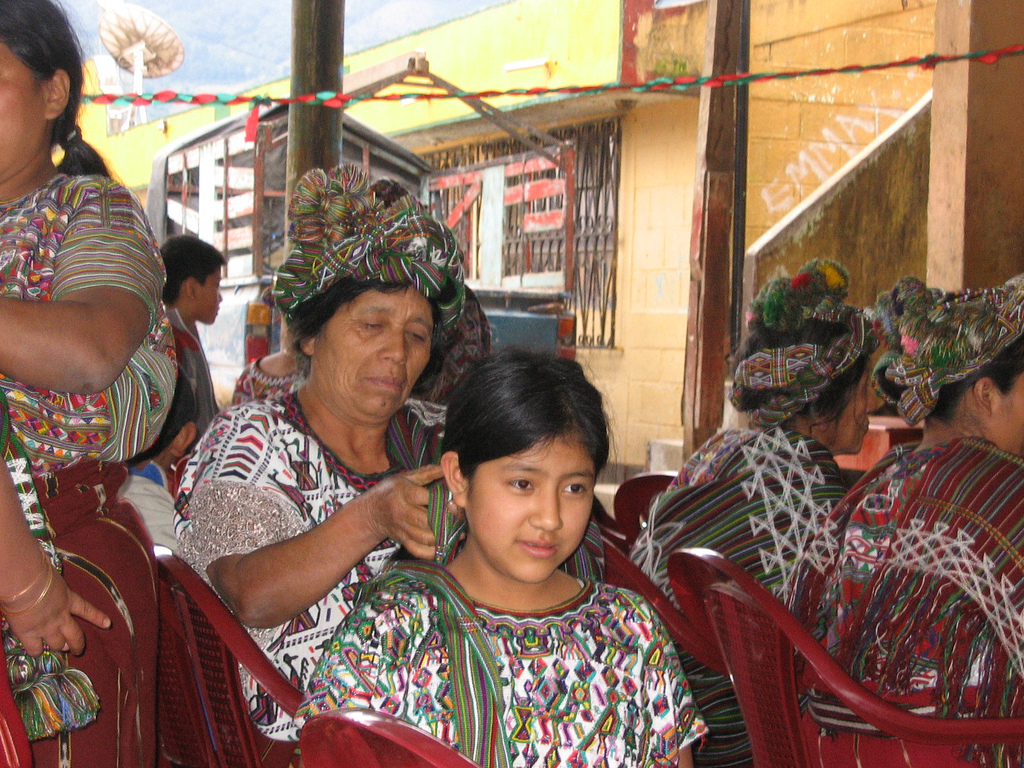
- Ixil people of Santa María Nebaj, Quiché Department

Total population
- 133,569

Regions with significant populations
- Guatemala (Ixil triangle): 133,329 (2018)
- Mexico (Campeche, Quintana Roo): 240 (2020)

Languages
- Ixil, Spanish

Religion
- Catholic, Evangelical, Maya religion

Related ethnic groups
- Awakatek

The Ixil (pronounced [iʂil]) are a Maya people located in the states of Campeche and Quintana Roo in Mexico and in the municipalities of Santa María Nebaj, San Gaspar Chajul, and San Juan Cotzal in the northern part of the Cuchumatanes mountains of the department of Quiché, Guatemala. These three municipalities are known as the Ixil Triangle and are the place of origin of the Ixil culture and where the majority of the population lives.

During the Guatemalan Civil War (1960–1996), the Ixil people were victims of repression and violence by the Guatemalan military government in what is known as the Guatemalan genocide; many were displaced forcibly to Mexico to escape the violence. Once on Mexican territory, they established refugee camps that later became new towns and permanent communities.

== Language ==
The Ixil language belongs to the Mamean branch of Mayan languages and has two dialects: Ixil Nebajeño and Ixil Chajuleño. It is very closely related to the Awakatek language.

== Location ==
In Campeche, the Ixil live in the communities of Quetzal Edzná and Los Laureles from the Campeche municipality and in Maya Tecún II from the municipality of Champotón. In Quintana Roo they live in the localities of Kuchumatán and Maya Balam from the Bacalar municipality.

== Genocide ==
In the early 1980s, the Ixil Community was one of the principal targets of a genocide operation, involving systematic rape, forced displacements and hunger during the Guatemalan civil war. In May 2013 Efraín Ríos Montt was found guilty by a Guatemala court of having ordered the deaths of 1,771 Ixil people. The presiding judge, Jazmin Barrios, declared that "[t]he Ixils were considered public enemies of the state and were also victims of racism, considered an inferior race." According to a 1999 United Nations truth commission, between 70% and 90% of Ixil villages were razed and 60% of the population in the altiplano region were forced to flee to the mountains between 1982 and 1983. By 1996, it was estimated that some 7,000 Maya Ixil had been killed. The violence was particularly heightened during 1979–1985 as successive Guatemalan administrations and the military pursued an indiscriminate scorched-earth (in Spanish: tierra arrasada) policy.

In 2013, General Efraín Ríos Montt, who served as President of Guatemala from 1982 to 1983, was found guilty of genocide against the Ixil people. In 2018, a Guatemalan court ruled that the army committed acts of genocide, but no one was convicted. In 2024, General Manuel Benedicto Lucas García (brother of President Fernando Romeo Lucas García) was placed on trial for genocide, crimes against humanity, forced disappearances, and sexual violence against the Maya Ixil people. He ordered more than 30 massacres and destroyed 23 villages in the Maya Ixil region, causing the death of at least 1,771 people when he led the army between 1981 and 1982.

== Celebrations ==
In Campeche, the Ixil celebrate the Day of the Nature with a ceremony to thank Mother Earth for the food granted to them. This ceremony starts near a body of water where the people come together to share cultivated products like corn, beans, fruits and vegetables.

== Religion ==
In Campeche, the Ixil people praise the Sun (K'ii in Ixil) in a daily ritual where the head of the family goes right to the sunset, and in ceremonial manner thanks the Sun for its light and for guiding his path to work, asking to not suffer any accident along the way or get lost.

== See also ==
- Ixil language
- Ixil genocide
