= San Juan Cotzal =

San Juan Cotzal Cotzal
- Municipality
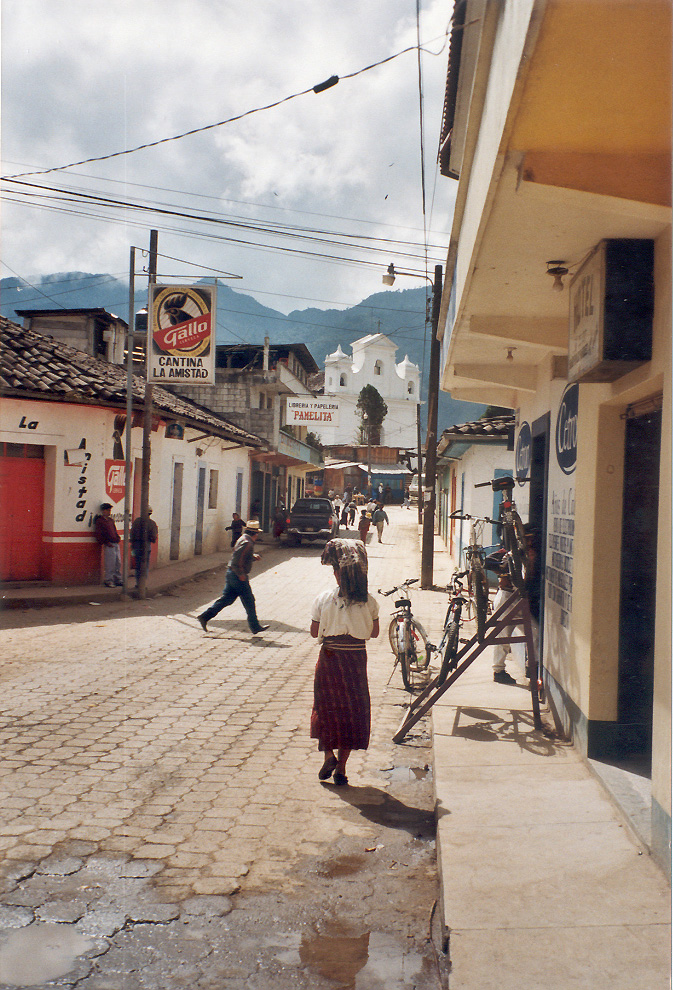

- Location in Guatemala
- Coordinates: 15°26′7″N 91°2′8″W
- Country: Guatemala
- Department: El Quiché
- Municipality: San Juan Cotzal

Government
  - Type: Municipal
  - Mayor: Baltazar Cruz Torres (PP)

Area
  - Municipality: 88 sq mi (227 km^{2})
- Elevation: 5,600 ft (1,700 m)

Population (Census 2018)
  - Municipality: 31,532
  - Density: 360/sq mi (139/km^{2})
  - Urban: 14,032
  - Ethnicities: Ixil K'iche' Ladino
  - Religions: Roman Catholicism Evangelicalism Maya
- Climate: Cfb
- Website: http://www.inforpressca.com/cotzal/

San Juan Cotzal (Spanish pronunciation: [saŋ ˈxwaŋ koˈtsal]) is a town and municipality in the Guatemalan department of El Quiché. San Juan Cotzal is part of the Ixil Community, along with Santa María Nebaj and San Gaspar Chajul.

== History ==
=== Pre-Hispanic era ===
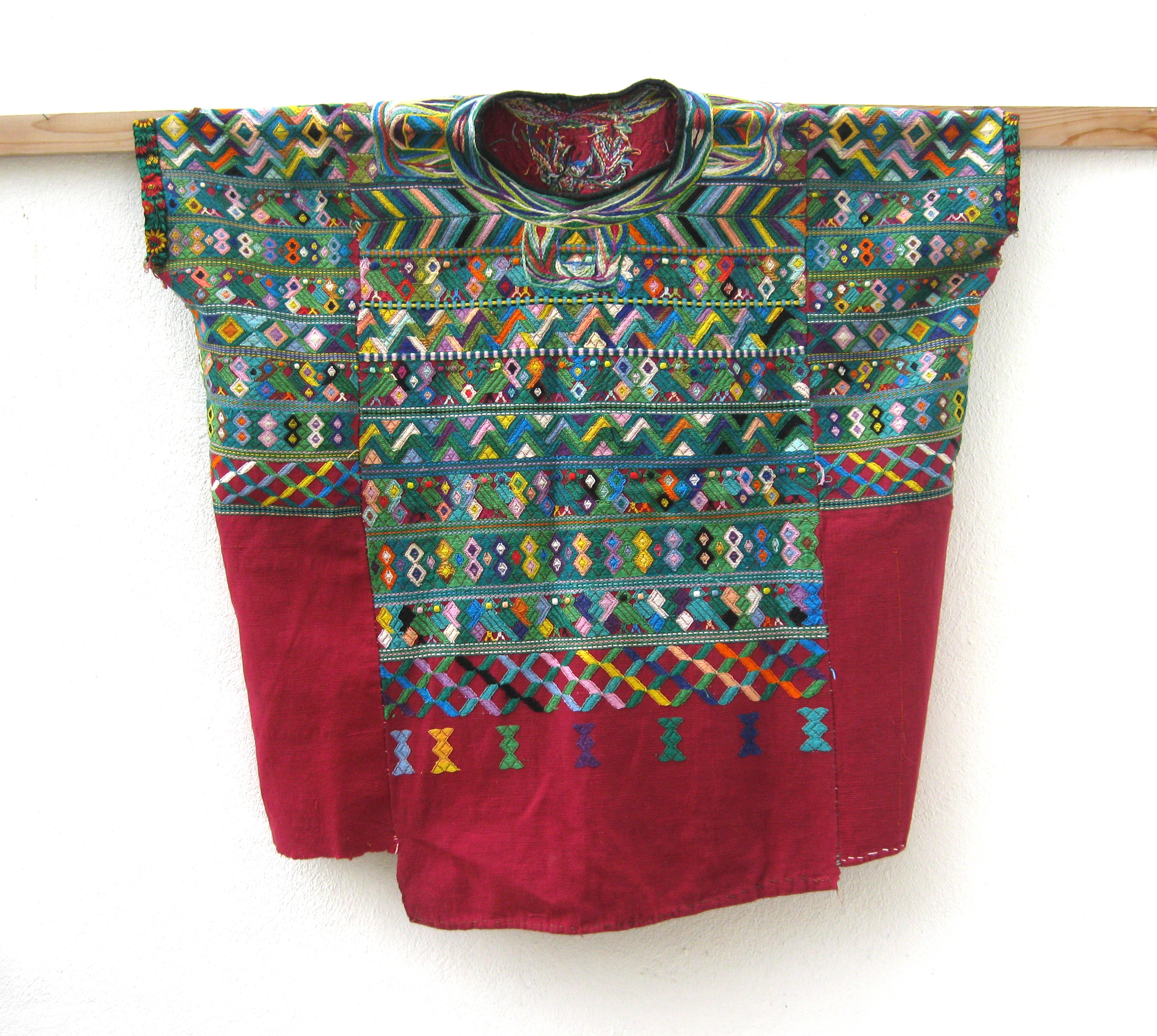

Worried about the defection of the aj K'ub'ul family chief, who had taken his family away to look for fertile and, above all, Pacific land, the K'iche' king sent a group of soldiers to control their movements. He was afraid that the aj K'ub'ul would look for reinforcements from other ethnic groups in the area to form a strong army and attack the K'iche's. The warriors settled to the east of the aj K'ub'ul and, since the K'iche's had moved away to look for an undisturbed place to settle, they were a peaceful community. The warriors informed the K'iche' king as much, reassuring him that he had no reason to worry about the exiled group.

As time went by, the K'iche' warriors realized that the aj K'ub'ul life was very different from the one they were used to have under the ruling of their king, as they simply worked on their land and crops and then enjoyed their families without having to worry about being invaded or called to fight in a war. They went back to their place of origin, Tujalj (Sacapulas and Canillá), but only to pick up their families, and went on to settle a new community where they were once stationed to keep an eye on the aj K'ub'ul. (Note: This was confirmed by Antonio Rodríguez, from Sacapulas, who witnessed the contact his family had with Rabinal, San Miguel Chicaj and Salamá in the 1950s. They knew that their families were related and always brought Sacapulas produce into those municipalities.)

=== Campaigns in the Cuchumatanes ===
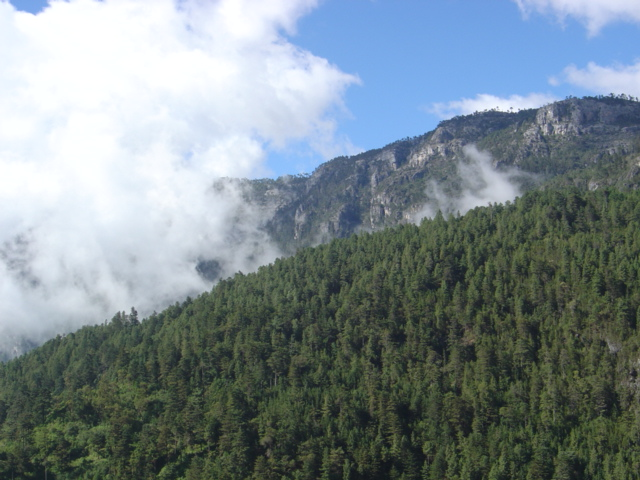
The complex terrain and remoteness of the Cuchumatanes made Spanish conquest difficult.

In the 10 years after the fall of Zaculeu, commencing in 1525, various Spanish expeditions crossed into the Sierra de Los Cuchumatanes and engaged in the gradual and complex conquest of the Chuj and Q'anjob'al. The Spanish were attracted to the region in the hope of extracting gold, silver and other riches from the mountains but their remoteness, the difficult terrain, and relatively low population made their conquest and exploitation extremely difficult. The population of the Cuchumatanes is estimated to have been 260,000 before European contact. By the time the Spanish physically arrived in the region, this had collapsed to 150,000 due to Old World diseases that had run ahead of them.

=== Uspantán and the Ixil ===
After the western portion of the Cuchumatanes fell to the Spanish, the Ixil and Uspantek Maya were sufficiently isolated to evade immediate Spanish attention. The Uspantek and the Ixil were allies and in 1529, four years after the conquest of Huehuetenango, Uspantek warriors were harassing Spanish forces and Uspantán was trying to foment rebellion among the K'iche'.

Uspantek activity became sufficiently troublesome that the Spanish decided that military action was necessary. Gaspar Arias, the magistrate of Guatemala, penetrated the eastern Cuchumatanes with 60 Spanish infantry and 300 allied indigenous warriors. By early September he had imposed temporary Spanish authority over the Ixil towns of Chajul and Nebaj. The Spanish army then marched east toward Uspantán itself; Arias then received notice that the acting governor of Guatemala, Francisco de Orduña, had deposed him as a magistrate. Arias handed command over to the inexperienced Pedro de Olmos and returned to confront de Orduña. Although his officers advised against it, Olmos launched a disastrous full-scale frontal assault on the city. As soon as the Spanish began their assault they were ambushed from the rear by more than 2,000 Uspantek warriors. The Spanish forces were routed with heavy losses; many of their indigenous allies were slain, and many more were captured alive by the Uspantek warriors only to be sacrificed on the altar of their deity Exbalamquen. The survivors who managed to evade capture fought their way back to the Spanish garrison at Q'umarkaj.

A year later Francisco de Castellanos set out from Santiago de los Caballeros de Guatemala (by now relocated to Ciudad Vieja) on another expedition against the Ixil and Uspantek, leading eight corporals, 32 cavalry, 40 Spanish infantry and several hundred allied indigenous warriors. The expedition rested at Chichicastenango and recruited further forces before marching seven leagues northwards to Sacapulas and climbed the steep southern slopes of the Cuchumatanes. On the upper slopes, they clashed with a force of between four and five thousand Ixil warriors from Nebaj and nearby settlements. A lengthy battle followed during which the Spanish cavalry managed to outflank the Ixil army and forced them to retreat to their mountaintop fortress at Nebaj.

The Spanish forces besieged the city, and their indigenous allies managed to scale the walls, penetrate the stronghold and set it on fire. Many defending Ixil warriors withdrew to fight the fire, which allowed the Spanish to storm the entrance and break the native defences. The victorious Spanish rounded up the surviving defenders and the next day Castellanos ordered them all to be branded as slaves as punishment for their resistance. The inhabitants of Chajul immediately capitulated to the Spanish as soon as news of the battle reached them. The Spanish continued east towards Uspantán to find it defended by 10,000 warriors, including forces from Cotzal, Cunén, Sacapulas, and Verapaz. The Spaniards were barely able to organise a defence before the defending army attacked. Although heavily outnumbered, the deployment of Spanish cavalry and the firearms of the Spanish infantry eventually decided the battle. The Spanish overran Uspantán and again branded all surviving warriors as slaves. The surrounding towns also surrendered, and December 1530 marked the end of the military stage of the conquest of the Cuchumatanes.

== Population ==
According to an official census performed by the Guatemalan National Statistics Institute (INE), the municipality had a total population of 14,137 in 1994; in 2002 this grew by 42% and in 2008 a study determined that there was an additional 29% increase. The following tables show the difference population classification in San Juan Cotzal:

By gender
Gender	Total 1994 Census	% 1994 Census	Total 2002 Census	% 2002 Census	Total estimated in 2008	% estimated in 2008
Male	6631	47	9,611	48	12713	49
Female	7506	53	10,439	52	13232	51
TOTAL	14137	100	20050	100	25945	100

By ethnic group
Ethnic group	Total 1994 Census	% 1994 Census	Total 2002 Census	% 2002 Census	Total estimated in 2008	% estimated in 2008
Native	13236	94	19520	97	25167	97
Non-native	901	6	530	3	778	3
TOTAL	14137	100	20050	100	25945	100

By age
Age range	Total 1994 Census	% 1994 Census	Total 2002 Census	% 2002 Census	Total estimated in 2008	% estimated in 2008
From 0 to 6	3436	24	5168	26	7005	27
From 7 to 14	3201	23	4493	22	5967	23
From 15 to 64	7080	50	9686	48	12194	47
More than 65	420	3	703	4	779	3
TOTAL	14137	100	20050	100	25945	100

By location
Area	Total 1994 Census	% 1994 Census	Total 2002 Census	% 2002 Census	Total estimated in 2008	% estimated in 2008
Urban	5,069	36	9037	45	13232	51
Rural	9,068	64	11013	55	12713	49
TOTAL	14137	100	20050	100	25945	100

=== Dwelling ===
86% of the population owns their home, while the rest live in borrowed (12%) or rented (2%) houses. Most of the urban structures are made of zinc sheets roofing and brick walls. Rural area homes are built out of wood and 'teja', and lack any kind of flooring.

=== Occupation and salaries ===
Agriculture is the primary economic activity in the area, with individuals who cultivate their own land generally earning higher incomes than other agricultural workers.

Occupation (2008)
Activity	Urban area	Rural area	Total	%
Agriculture	93	371	464	61
Management	80	48	128	17
Artinsan work	42	45	87	11
Commerce	33	24	57	8
Livestock	2	11	13	2
Industry	5	5	10	1
TOTAL	255	504	759	100

Income sources(2008)
Income source	Urban area	Rural area	Total	% Total
Work own land	79	193	272	52
Labor force	69	115	184	36
Own business	26	21	47	9
Family remittances	8	1	9	2
Retirement	5	2	7	1
TOTAL	187	332	519	100

Income levels (2008)
In Quetzales	Homes	%
0 to 400	173	33
401 to 800	174	33
801 to 1200	85	16
1201 to 1600	38	7
1601 to 2000	26	4
2001 to 2400	9	2
2401 to 2800	9	2
2801 to 3200	10	2
3201 to 3600	0	0
3601 or more	3	1
TOTAL	527	100

82% of the population had an income of Q1,200.00/month, which was less than minimal wage at the time. Area development halted during the Guatemalan Civil War, although economic conditions were not all that prosperous even before it.

=== Education ===
San Juan Cotzal has numerous educational institutions: 22 of them are public schools run by the Government.

Enrolled students by education level
Level	1994				2008			
Level	Public	Private	Cooperative	Total	Public	Private	Cooperative	Total
Preschool	377	-	108	485	478	-	136	614
Elementary	1756	-	37	1793	3118	63	51	3232
Middle level
Junior High School	-	-	84	84	-	-	558	5582
High School	-	-	-	-	-	-	77	77
TOTAL	2133	-	229	2362	3596	63	822	4481

Coverage by education level
Education level	Student population in 1994			Student population in 2008		
Education level	Enrolled students	Coverage	%	Enrolled students	Coverage	%
Preschool	2436	485	20	6237	614	10
Elementary	3201	1793	57	4490	3232	72
Middle level
Junior High School	2080	84	4	3908	558	14
High School	-	-	-	5664	77	1
TOTAL	7717	2362		20299	4481	

Teachers by education level
Level	1994				2008			
Level	Public	Private	Cooperative	Total	Public	Private	Cooperative	Total
Preschool	12	-	3	15	22	-	N.A	22
Elementary	30	-	2	32	96	-	N/A	96
Middle level
Junior High School	8	-	6	14	23	-	9	32
High School	-	-	-	-	-	-	10	10
TOTAL	50	-	11	61	141	-	19	160

Education level
Level	1994					2008				
Level	Public	Private	Cooperative	Total	%	Public	Private	Cooperative	Total	%
Preschool	36	-	22	58	67	18	-	8	26	9
Elementary	9	-	2	11	13	135	5	52	192	68
Middle level
Junior High School	12	-	5	17	20	53	-	5	58	21
High School	-	-	-	-	-	-	-	5	5	2
TOTAL	57	-	29	86	100	206	5	70	281	100

== Economy ==
The production activity details are shown in the following tables:

Agriculture
Product	Production en quintals	Total value in Quetzales
Corn	6691	802920
Beans	679	203700
Coffee	51780	10,356,000
TOTAL	59150	11,362,620

Private services
Business type	Establishments	Total value in Quetzales
Bus	20	2,520,000
Nixtamal mill	70	1,260,000
Cable TV	3	540000
Barber shops	12	201600
Photo shops	4	156000
Photocopy centers	5	150000
Entertainment establishments	2	144000
Hotels	3	144000
Workshops	3	99000
Computation academy	2	84000
Dentistry	1	60000
Radio stations	1	42000
Music ensembles	1	36000
Shoemaker shops	5	30000
Typewriting	3	28800
Language schools	1	24000
Pulpero leasing	8	2880
TOTAL	144	5,522,280

Commercial activity
Business	Establishments	Total value in Quetzales
Family grocery stores	260	3,540,000
Butcher shops	22	1,200,000
Gas stations	51	612000
Hardware stores	4	576000
Food establishments	7	315000
Smithy	3	288000
Carpentry	6	240000
Bakery	6	216000
Dollar stores	12	172800
Weave stores	2	168000
Drug stores	7	142800
Liquor stores	3	131400
Cell phone parts	6	129600
Bookstores	7	100800
Shoe stores	4	96000
Propane shop	2	43200
Clothing	1	42000
Ice cream shops	1	36000
Agriculture supplies	1	24000
Newspaper stands	1	2400
TOTAL	406	8,076,000

Animal husbandry
Product	Cattle heads	Total value in Quetzales
Bovine	124	496000
Poultry	1,490	89400
Porcine	69	31050
Ovine	37	29600
Caprino	23	18400
TOTAL	1743	664450

Artisan activities
Activity	Units	Total value in Quetzales
Fabrics	6840	674400
Maguey products	9000	125280
Carpentry	252	91980
Smithy	90	41318
Tailoring	225	13500
Bakery	25000	7500
Candle making	6000	6000
TOTAL	47407	959,978

Source: Grupo EPS, 2010

== Climate ==
San Juan Cotzal has an oceanic climate (Köppen: Cfb).

Climate data for San Juan Cotzal
Month	Jan	Feb	Mar	Apr	May	Jun	Jul	Aug	Sep	Oct	Nov	Dec	Year
Mean daily maximum °C (°F)	21.4 (70.5)	22.4 (72.3)	24.2 (75.6)	24.7 (76.5)	24.3 (75.7)	23.3 (73.9)	22.7 (72.9)	23.1 (73.6)	23.0 (73.4)	22.0 (71.6)	22.1 (71.8)	21.8 (71.2)	22.9 (73.3)
Daily mean °C (°F)	15.5 (59.9)	16.0 (60.8)	17.5 (63.5)	18.2 (64.8)	18.3 (64.9)	18.3 (64.9)	17.6 (63.7)	17.6 (63.7)	17.6 (63.7)	17.0 (62.6)	16.5 (61.7)	16.0 (60.8)	17.2 (62.9)
Mean daily minimum °C (°F)	9.6 (49.3)	9.6 (49.3)	10.8 (51.4)	11.7 (53.1)	12.4 (54.3)	13.3 (55.9)	12.5 (54.5)	12.1 (53.8)	12.3 (54.1)	12.0 (53.6)	10.9 (51.6)	10.2 (50.4)	11.5 (52.6)
Average precipitation mm (inches)	44 (1.7)	29 (1.1)	40 (1.6)	53 (2.1)	118 (4.6)	284 (11.2)	231 (9.1)	199 (7.8)	227 (8.9)	197 (7.8)	104 (4.1)	46 (1.8)	1,572 (61.8)
Source: Climate-Data.org

== Geographic location ==
San Juan Cotzal is 269 km from Guatemala City and 104 km from Santa Cruz del Quiché through the Quiché 6 West highway.

== See also ==
- Guatemala Civil War
- Franja Transversal del Norte

== Notes and references ==
=== Bibliography ===
- Bran Prado, Byron Rafael; et al. (2010). "Diagnóstico de inversión social". Diagnóstico socioeconómico: potentialidades productivas y propuestas de inversión. Municipio de San Juan Cotzal, departamento de El Quiché. Informe general (PDF). Investigación de Campo, Grupo EPS (Report) (in Spanish). Vol. 2. Guatemala: Facultad de Ciencias Económicas de la Universidad de San Carlos de Guatemala.
- Flores Moreno, Nery Osvaldo; et al. (2010). "Diagnóstico financiero municipal". Diagnóstico socioeconómico: potentialidades productivas y propuestas de inversión. Municipio de San Juan Cotzal, departamento de El Quiché. Informe general (PDF). Investigación de Campo, Grupo EPS (Report) (in Spanish). Vol. 10. Guatemala: Facultad de Ciencias Económicas de la Universidad de San Carlos de Guatemala.
- García Valenzuela, Francisca; et al. (2010). "Diagnóstico de las fuentes de financiamiento municipal". Diagnóstico socioecnómico: potentialidades productivas y propuestas de inversión. Municipio de San Juan Cotzal, departamento de El Quiché. Informe general (PDF). Investigación de Campo, Grupo EPS (Report) (in Spanish). Vol. 11. Guatemala: Facultad de Ciencias Económicas de la Universidad de San Carlos de Guatemala.
- Limón Aguirre, Fernando (2008). "La ciudadanía del pueblo chuj en México: Una dialéctica negativa de identidades" (PDF). Alteridades (in Spanish). 18 (35). San Cristóbal de Las Casas, México: El Colegio de la Frontera Sur – Unidad San Cristóbal de Las Casas. Archived from the original (PDF) on 22 July 2012.
- Lovell, W. George (2005). Conquest and Survival in Colonial Guatemala: A Historical Geography of the Cuchumatán Highlands, 1500-1821 (3rd ed.). Montreal, Canadá: McGill-Queen's University Press. ISBN 0-7735-2741-9. OCLC 58051691.
- Marroquín Lopez, Marvin Ottoniel; et al. (2010). "Costos y rentabilidad de unidades pecuarias (crianza y engorde de ganado bovino)". Diagnóstico socioecnómico: potentialidades productivas y propuestas de inversión. Municipio de San Juan Cotzal, departamento de El Quiché. Informe general (PDF). Ejercicio Profesional Supervisado (Report) (in Spanish). Vol. 4. Facultad de Ciencias Económicas de la Universidad de San Carlos de Guatemala.
- Thompson, John Eric Sidney (1990) [1977]. Maya History and Religion. Civilization of the American Indian series. Vol. 99. University of Oklahoma Press. p. 415. ISBN 9780806122472.
