= Chajul =

Chajul San Gaspar Chajul
- Municipality
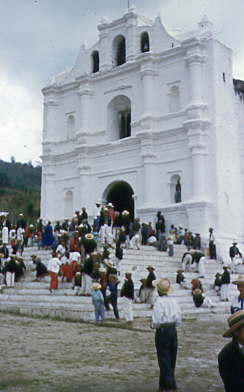
- Church in Chajul in the 1950s

- Location in Guatemala
- Coordinates: 15°29′14″N 91°02′05″W
- Country: Guatemala
- Department: El Quiché
- Municipality: Chajul

Government
  - Type: Municipal

Area
  - Municipality: 276 sq mi (716 km^{2})

Population (Census 2018)
  - Municipality: 46,658
  - Density: 169/sq mi (65.2/km^{2})
  - Urban: 24,247
  - Ethnicities: Ixil K'iche' people Ladino
  - Religions: Roman Catholicism Evangelicalism Maya
- Climate: Cfb

Chajul (Spanish pronunciation: [tʃaˈxul]; full name San Gaspar Chajul) is a town and municipality in the Guatemalan department of El Quiché. Chajul is part of the Ixil Community, along with San Juan Cotzal and Santa María Nebaj. The Ixil region is isolated by beautiful mountains and has maintained its rich Ixil Maya traditions and language. Chajul, Nebaj, and Cotzal make up the Ixil Region in the Department of Quiché in the Western Highlands of Guatemala. Having been at the heart of the 36-year civil war, Chajul experiences post-war challenges such as emotional trauma, land displacement, and fragmented families. Additionally, unemployment is high, large families live in one-room adobe houses with open cooking fires, opportunities for women are scarce, and family- and gender-based violence are common. The community has a corn-based agricultural economy in which adults struggle daily to feed their families and the average income is $1–3 per day. A 2002 study revealed that less than 1% of children graduate from high school (5% from middle school) as they are forced to leave school at a young age to help support the family household, leaving 75% of the adult population illiterate. Chajul further suffers from common preventable health concerns, such as respiratory illness, intestinal disease, tuberculosis, malnutrition, and death during childbirth. Eighty percent of the Chajul population lives in poverty.

== History ==
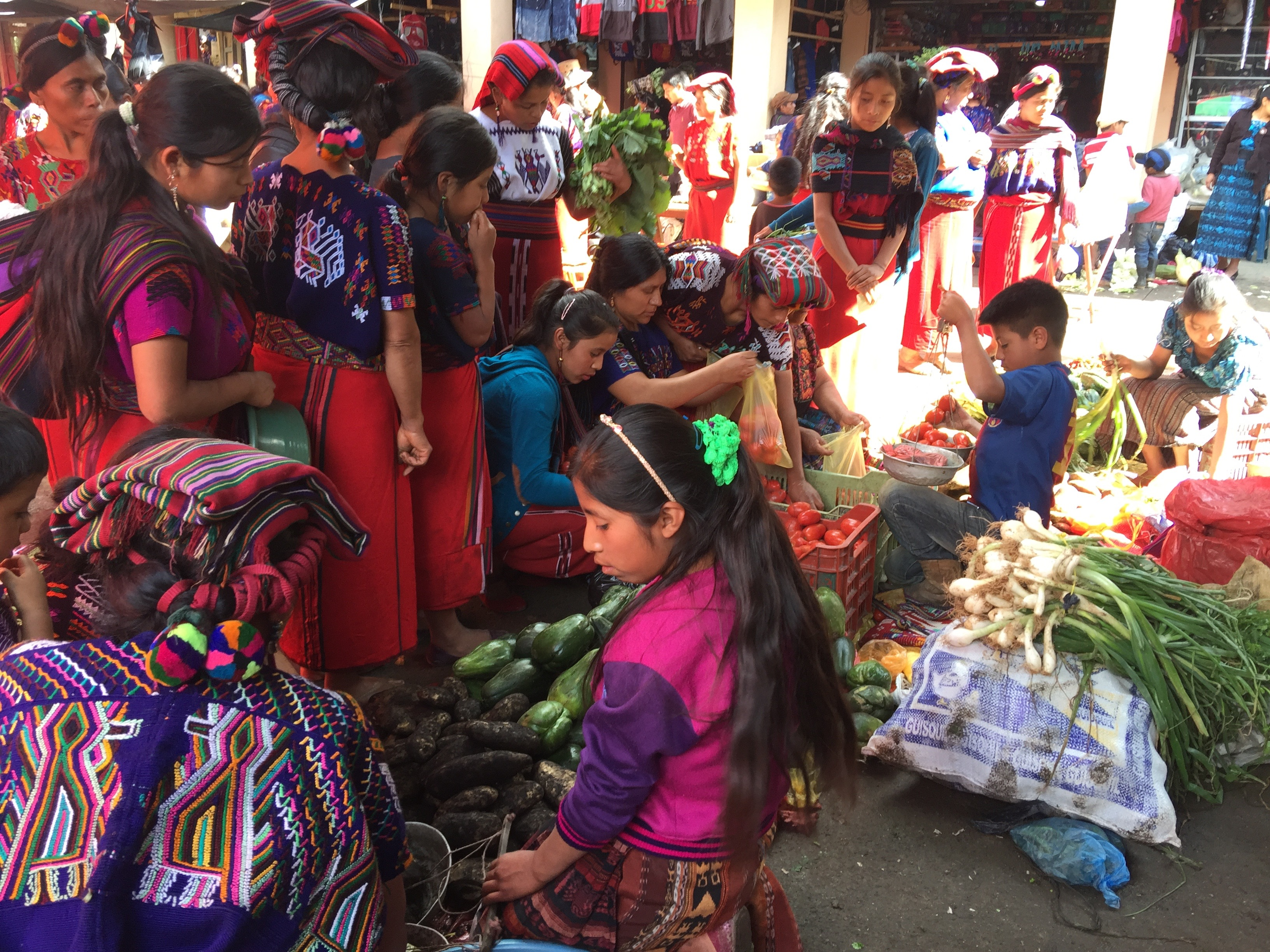
Weekly market at Chajul. Maya villagers from surrounding areas come here to stock up on essentials

=== Franja Transversal del Norte ===
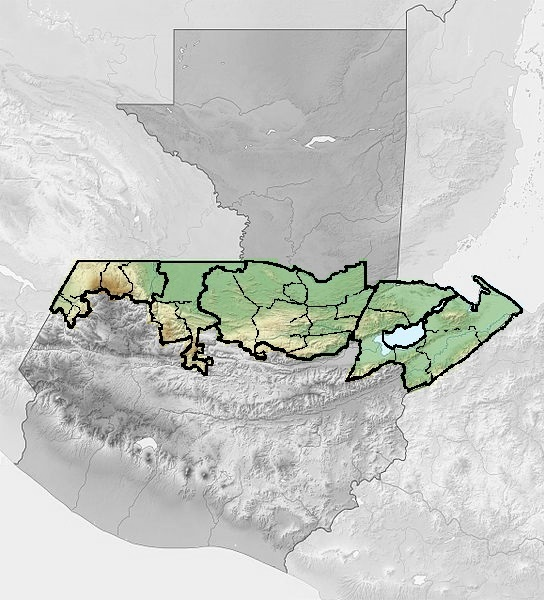
Location of Chajul in Franja Transversal del Norte

The Northern Transversal Strip was officially created during the government of General Carlos Arana Osorio in 1970, by Legislative Decree 60-70, for agricultural development. The decree literally said: "It is of public interest and national emergency, the establishment of Agrarian Development Zones in the area included within the municipalities: San Ana Huista, San Antonio Huista, Nentón, Jacaltenango, San Mateo Ixtatán, and Santa Cruz Barillas in Huehuetenango; Chajul and San Miguel Uspantán in Quiché; Cobán, Chisec, San Pedro Carchá, Lanquín, Senahú, Cahabón and Chahal, in Alta Verapaz and the entire department of Izabal."

=== Guerrilla Army of the Poor ===
On January 19, 1972, members of a new Guatemalan guerrilla movement entered Ixcán, from Mexico, and were accepted by many farmers; in 1973, after an exploratory foray into the municipal seat of Cotzal, the insurgent group decided to set up camp underground in the mountains of Xolchiché, municipality of Chajul.

In 1974 the insurgent guerrilla group held its first conference, where it defined its strategy of action for the coming months and called itself Guerrilla Army of the Poor (-Ejército Guerrillero de los Pobres -EGP-). In 1975 the organization had spread around the area of the mountains of northern municipalities of Nebaj and Chajul. As part of its strategy EGP decided to perpetrate notorious acts which also symbolized the establishment of a "social justice" against the inefficiency and ineffectiveness of the judicial and administrative State institutions. They also wanted that with these actions the indigenous rural population of the region identified with the insurgency, thus motivating them to join their ranks. As part of this plan it was agreed to do the so-called "executions"; in order to determine who would be subject to "execution", the EGP gathered complaints received from local communities. For example, they selected two victims: Guillermo Monzón, who was a military Commissioner in Ixcán and José Luis Arenas, the largest landowner in the area, and who had been reported to the EGP for allegedly having land conflicts with neighboring settlements and abusing their workers. Arenas, who at that time a journalist had nicknamed as the "Ixcán Tiger" had been active in Guatemalan politics and during Carlos Arana Osorio presidency (1970–1974) was in charge of the Promotion and Development of Petén agency (FYDEP); later, he left politics for agriculture in his coffee and cardamom plantations in the Ixcán and the Ixil area, in Quiché.

On Saturday, 7 June 1975, José Luis Arenas was murdered when he was in the premises of his farm "La Perla" to pay his workers. In front of his office there were approximately two to three hundred people to receive their payment and four EGP members hidden among the farmers. After the business at hand was over, guerrilla members destroyed the communication radio of the farm and executed Arenas. Following Arenas murder, the guerrilla members spoke in Ixil language to the farmers, informing them that they were members of the Guerrilla Army of the Poor and had killed the "Ixcán Tiger" due to his alleged multiple crimes against community members. Then the attackers fled towards Chajul.

José Luis Arenas' son, who was in San Luis Ixcán at the time, took refuge in a nearby mountain, waiting for a plane to arrive to take him to Guatemala City, in order to immediately report the matter to Minister of Defense, general Fernando Romeo Lucas García (who later was president from 1978 to 1982). General Romeo Lucas replied, "You are mistaken, there are no guerrillas in the area".

== Climate ==
Chajul has an oceanic climate (Köppen: Cfb).

Climate data for Chajul
Month	Jan	Feb	Mar	Apr	May	Jun	Jul	Aug	Sep	Oct	Nov	Dec	Year
Mean daily maximum °C (°F)	20.6 (69.1)	21.6 (70.9)	23.4 (74.1)	24.0 (75.2)	23.4 (74.1)	22.5 (72.5)	21.8 (71.2)	22.2 (72.0)	22.1 (71.8)	21.1 (70.0)	21.3 (70.3)	21.0 (69.8)	22.1 (71.7)
Daily mean °C (°F)	14.6 (58.3)	15.1 (59.2)	16.6 (61.9)	17.4 (63.3)	17.5 (63.5)	17.5 (63.5)	16.7 (62.1)	16.7 (62.1)	16.8 (62.2)	16.1 (61.0)	15.7 (60.3)	15.2 (59.4)	16.3 (61.4)
Mean daily minimum °C (°F)	8.7 (47.7)	8.7 (47.7)	9.9 (49.8)	10.8 (51.4)	11.6 (52.9)	12.5 (54.5)	11.7 (53.1)	11.2 (52.2)	11.6 (52.9)	11.2 (52.2)	10.1 (50.2)	9.5 (49.1)	10.6 (51.1)
Average precipitation mm (inches)	65 (2.6)	42 (1.7)	50 (2.0)	66 (2.6)	128 (5.0)	306 (12.0)	265 (10.4)	230 (9.1)	251 (9.9)	224 (8.8)	127 (5.0)	64 (2.5)	1,818 (71.6)
Source: Climate-Data.org

== Geographic location ==
Chajul is surrounded by El Quiché Department municipalities:

== See also ==
- El Quiché Department

== Notes and references ==
=== Bibliography ===
- Solano, Luis (2012). Contextualización histórica de la Franja Transversal del Norte (FTN) (PDF) (in Spanish). Centro de Estudios y Documentación de la Frontera Occidental de Guatemala, CEDFOG. Archived from the original (PDF) on 13 November 2014.
