= The Traffic in Women: Notes on the Political Economy of Sex =

1975 article by Gayle Rubin

The Traffic in Women: Notes on the "Political Economy" of Sex is an article regarding theories of the oppression of women originally published in 1975 by feminist anthropologist Gayle Rubin. In the article, Rubin argued against the Marxist conceptions of women's oppression — specifically the concept of patriarchy — in favor of her own concept of the sex/gender system. By arguing that women's oppression could not be explained by capitalism alone, and stressing the distinction between biological sex and gender, Rubin's work helped to develop women's and gender studies as independent fields. The framework of the article was also important in that it opened up the possibility of researching the change in meaning of this categories over historical time. Rubin used a combination of kinship theories from Lévi-Strauss, psycho-analytic theory from Freud, and critiques of structuralism by Lacan to make her case that it was at moments where women were exchanged (principally through marriage acts) that bodies were engendered and became women. Rubin's article has been republished numerous times since its debut in 1975, and it has remained a key piece of feminist anthropological theory and a foundational work in gender studies.

== Origins and publication ==
Rubin began work on the article when she was an undergraduate at the University of Michigan, based on her wide readings in social science and humanities theory under her advisor Marshall Sahlins. At the time, Rubin wished to be a Women's Studies major, but no such program existed. Rubin therefore declared one as an independent field and became the first Women's Studies graduate from the university in 1972. At the university, Rubin took part in reading groups organized by members of the New Left, and she was enmeshed in Marxist theory and critiques. She became a reader of publications like the New Left Review, which exposed her also to the critiques and analyses of Marxism by Lacan and Althusser that informed her writing. She was struck by how Marxists failed to adequately explain the roots of female oppression in the global world, and how Marxism subsumed the problem of female oppression within the problems of capitalism more generally. Encouraged by Sahlins, this was also when she first read Claude Lévi-Strauss' book The Elementary Structures of Kinship. As Rubin would say in a later interview with Judith Butler: "It [Lévi-Strauss] completely blew my mind." In addition, Rubin was then reading the newly emergent strands of post-structuralist theory from French intellectuals.

The paper arose from several drafts of a term paper for a course she was taking with Sahlins. Parts of this term paper were reworked by Rubin to become a section of her undergraduate thesis, and it was this section that Rayna Reiter later excised and published in the 1975 feminist anthology Toward an Anthropology of Women. Though the article was also published in a lesser known feminist studies journal around the same time, it was from that anthology that it gained a wide audience.

== Summary ==
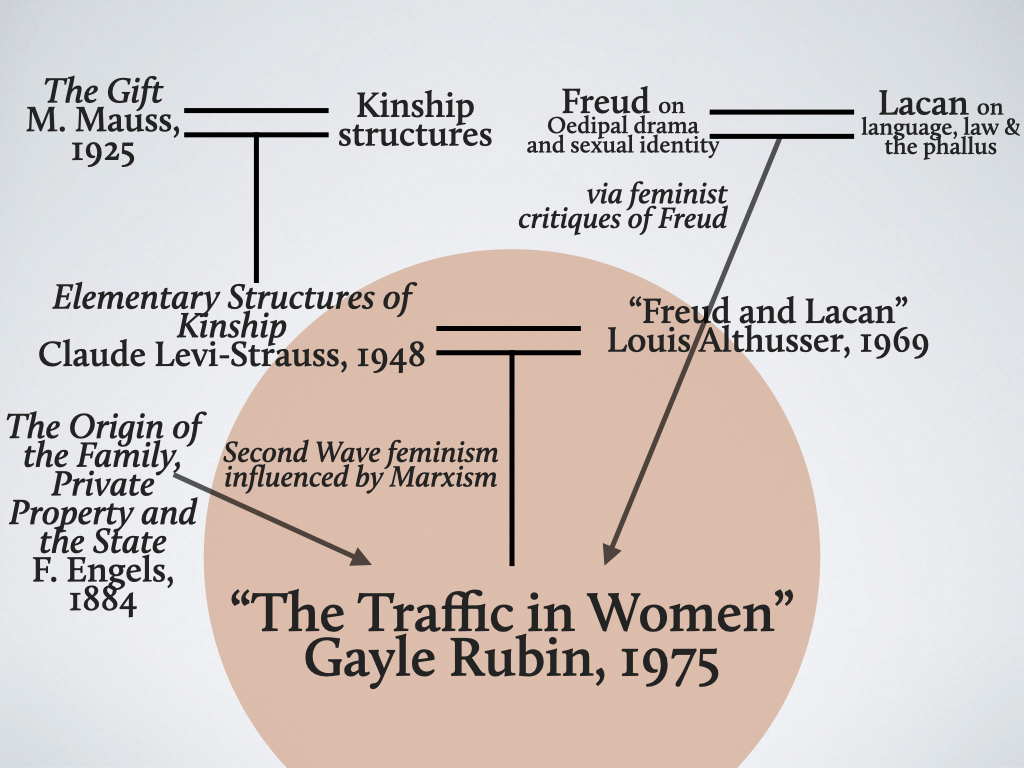
A kinship diagram of theoretical influences on Gayle Rubin's landmark article "The Traffic in Women"

Rubin's article is about fully understanding and accounting for the generalized oppression of women in the world — in both industrial capitalist and other kinds of societies. Rubin refers to this part of the social as the "sex/gender system." In making this analysis, she combines elements of various theoretical frameworks.

She first challenges Marxism, arguing that it is unable to "fully express or conceptualize sex oppression." Marx offers a very useful account of women's role only in the industrial capitalist context. Men work for wage labor jobs — their surplus value being converted into profits for the ruling class or bourgeoisie — while women work at home to sustain and reproduce this labor. Rubin argues this analysis is insufficient. "But to explain women's usefulness to capitalism is one thing. To argue that this usefulness explains the genesis of the oppression of women is quite another." Classical Marxism therefore fails to explain why it is that women should be so oppressed merely because they perform this reproductive labor.

Just as it cannot account for the oppression of women within capitalist societies, Marxism also cannot explain why it exists outside of them. Rubin provides several examples, such as in the New Guinea highlands and in the Amazon river valley, where the oppression of women thrives and yet capitalist conditions are not present. She points out that pre-capitalist Europe was also not free of women's oppression. Rather than being inherent to it, the oppression of women instead exists independently of capitalism as a system.

Rubin then turns to the work of Friedrich Engels. She uses Engels' method in The Origin of the Family, Private Property, and the State, wherein he argues that women's oppression has been inherited from the social systems prior to capitalism (such as feudal and slave economies). Rubin argues that "We need to pursue the project that Engels abandoned" and recognize that women's oppression is tied to the means of production in all social forms, not just capitalism. Reflecting on the article later, Rubin described it as an attempt to expand the framework envisioned by Marxism: "I don’t think one can fully comprehend early second wave feminism without understanding its intimate yet conflicted relationship to New Left politics and Marxist intellectual frameworks. … In a sense, Marxism enabled people to pose a whole set of questions that Marxism could not satisfactorily answer."

As a method of studying this oppression in all social forms, Rubin examines kinship structures as they were theorized in The Elementary Structures of Kinship by Claude Lévi-Strauss. In particular, Rubin focuses on 1) the "gift exchange" of women and 2) Strauss' idea of incest as the ultimate human taboo. For Strauss, the marriage of women (in pre-capitalist forms of society) was always a form of gift exchange. The incest taboo functioned to promote these exchanges of women between families. By forbidding certain kinds of marriage between kin, it ensured that other forms of marriage would take place. Strauss showed that men were principally in control of the exchange and reception of women, or a kind of kinship exchange, rather than simply a gift exchange based on principles of reciprocity (as Marcel Mauss argued in his essay, The Gift). Rubin considers this "exchange of women" to be an "initial step toward building an arsenal of concepts with which sexual systems can be described."

Rather than describing this exchange in kinship terms as Strauss did, Rubin wants to also highlight the economic implications. Lévi-Straussian anthropological analysis centering kinship exchange cannot explain how gender arises and is connected to certain human bodies. This is because the incest taboo is not so universal as Strauss would have us think. There are certain groups of people where incest is normal and "such a marital future is taken for granted." Therefore, it cannot be the universal basis for why gender exists and why certain rights are reserved solely for men.

Rubin investigates the incest taboo further by bringing in the Oedipus Complex theory of Sigmund Freud. Rubin focuses on how Freudian theories of sexual repression (wherein young girls repress their sexual desires for their mothers) lead to a world where "language and...cultural meanings" are "imposed upon anatomy." Drawing upon Lacan's analysis of the symbolic exchange of the phallus, Rubin complicates Freud's Oedipal analysis. Rubin stresses that girls and women cannot give the phallus — they can receive it, "but only as a gift from a man." It is ultimately only by coming to terms with this lack of the ability to give the phallus that girls/women recognize themselves as such. In other words, they are to be exchanged and "trafficked," and this is the idea that defines their gender identity as it relates to their sexual, bodily or biological being.

In her conclusion, Rubin argues for a feminist analysis of the problem of the sex/gender system. She argues that it is only by seeing the system in total — in its symbolic, cultural, and economic implications — that we can we ask appropriate questions of it: "there are other questions to ask of a marriage system than whether or not it exchanges women." Rubin calls for new research on the sex/gender system in different contexts, arguing that scholars should ask for what purpose this exchange transpires in different societies.

== Reception and criticism ==
Rubin has continued to work on the ideas raised in the article throughout her scholarly career. Her 1982 article, "Thinking Sex: Notes for a Radical Theory of the Politics of Sexuality" was considered by Rubin herself to be a "corrective" to some of her arguments in "The Traffic in Women." Rubin also revisited the article directly in Deviations: a Gayle Rubin Reader in 2020, explaining the significance of the terms "traffic" and "trafficking" that were used in the article's original title. In addition, most of Rubin's other scholarly work continues to be concerned with the themes of sexuality and gender.

In a talk at a conference on sexuality in 2011, scholar Susan Stryker noted the continuing influence of the piece nearly 40 years since its publication. She also remarked that Rubin's work and successful career, which "skirted the margins of academe before ultimately finding a place within it," was inspiring to her own career in academia, a career that was made difficult by the oppression faced since she came out as a transgender woman in 1991.

Notably, Judith Butler has cited the work as key for their own studies on gender and sex. In a 2012 interview between the two, Butler observed that many think of Rubin as an agenda setter for "the methodology for lesbian and gay studies" as well as feminist theory.

Outside of anthropology, the article has also been critically engaged by philosophers, labor scholars, and others broadly interested in feminist ideas. Most of the criticisms surrounding the article came some years after its publication, the result of scholars questioning the psychoanalysis that Rubin used. Cultural critic Laura Kipnis wrote a response to the article in 2006, wherein she questioned whether the psychoanalysis employed by Rubin did not lead to an overly deterministic assessment of women's lives. Joan Wallach Scott, meanwhile, in "Gender, a Useful Category of Historical Analysis," questioned whether Rubin's psychoanalysis could effectively help the historian to interpret historical actors. Historical actors do not "always or literally fulfill the terms [either] of their society's prescriptions, or of our analytic categories." The historian should therefore be cautious when using psycho-analysis and recognize that subjects may live their lives on terms other than those given by historians and their own cultures.

== Bibliography and further reading ==
- Cherniavsky, Eva. "On (the Impossibility of) Teaching Gayle Rubin. Feminist Formations 32, no. 1 (2020): 88–95.
- Duggan, Lisa. “LOVE AND ANGER: Scenes from a Passionate Career.” GLQ 17, no. 1 (2011): 145–53.
- Houston, David L. R. “GAYLE RUBIN (1949–).” Routledge Key Guides: Fifty Key Anthropologists, 2010.
- Kipnis, Laura. "Response to "The Traffic in Women." Women's Studies Quarterly 34, no. 1/2 (2006): 434–437.
- Parvulescu, Anca. The Traffic in Women's Work: East European Migration and the Making of Europe. Chicago, IL: University of Chicago Press, 2014. P. 21–49.
- Pergadia, Samantha. "Geologies of Sex and Gender: Excavating the Materialism of Gayle Rubin and Judith Butler." Feminist Studies 44, no. 1 (2018): 171–196.
- Povinelli, Elizabeth A. “Feminism as a Way of Life.” Women’s Studies Quarterly 34, no. 1/2 (2006): 438–41.
- Rubin, Gayle. "The Traffic in Women: Notes on the "Political Economy" of Sex." In Ellen Lewin, Feminist Anthropology, a Reader. Malden, MA: Blackwell Publishing Ltd, 2006.
- Rubin, Gayle and Judith Butler. "Sexual Traffic: Interview with Gayle Rubin by Judith Butler." In Gayle Rubin, Deviations: A Gayle Rubin Reader (2012): 276–309.
- Scott, Joan W. "Gender: A Useful Category of Historical Analysis." The American Historical Review 91, no. 5 (Dec., 1986): 1053–1075.
- Stryker, Susan. "The Time Has Come to Think About Gayle Rubin. GLQ 17, no. 1 (Jan., 2011): 79–83.
