= Indigenous peoples in Guatemala =

Native Guatemalans
Guatemaltecos nativos (Spanish)
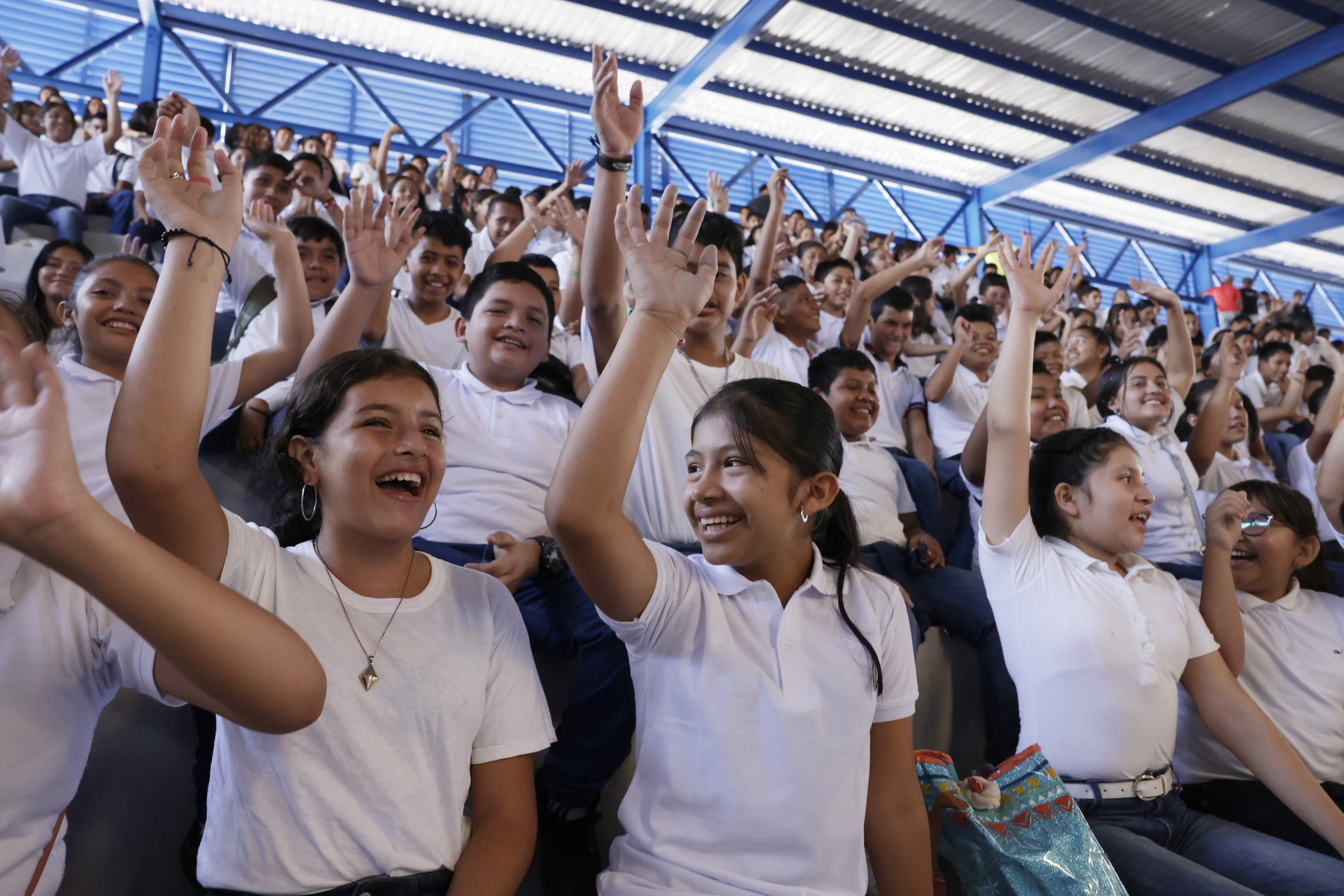
- Indigenous girls in Retalhuleu Department

Total population
- 6,471,670 (2018 census); 43.43% of the Guatemalan population

Regions with significant populations
- Throughout Guatemala, especially in the Guatemalan Highlands and Alta Verapaz

Languages
- Spanish, Mayan languages

Religion
- Maya religion

Related ethnic groups
- Indigenous peoples of the Americas, Ladino people

Indigenous peoples in Guatemala (Spanish: Pueblos Indígenas en Guatemala), also known as Native Guatemalans (Spanish: Guatemaltecos nativos), are people in the country of Guatemala who can trace all or most of their ancestry to the original inhabitants of the territory, predating Spanish colonization.

Guatemala is home to about 6.5 million (43.75%) people of Indigenous heritage belonging to the 22 Mayan peoples (Achi’, Akatec, Awakatec, Chalchitec, Ch’ortí, Chuj, Itzá, Ixil, Jacaltec, Kaq- chikel, K’iche, Mam, Mopan, Poqomam, Poqomchí, Q’anjob’al, Q’eqchí, Sakapultec, Sipakapense, Tektitek, Tz’utujil and Us- pantek), Garífuna and Xinca. The Maya are the largest Indigenous population in Guatemala.

== Table by department ==
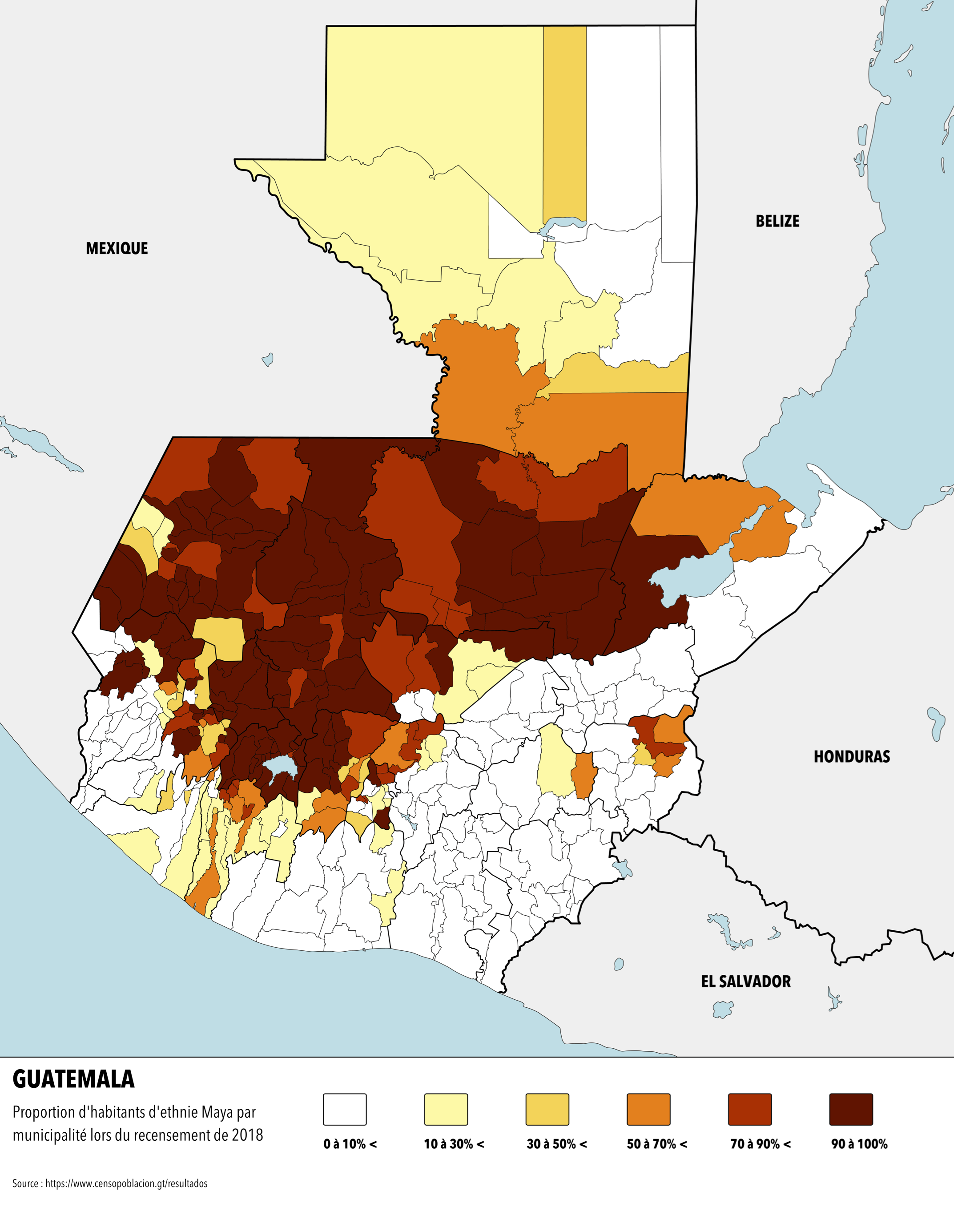
Map of indigenous Maya distribution

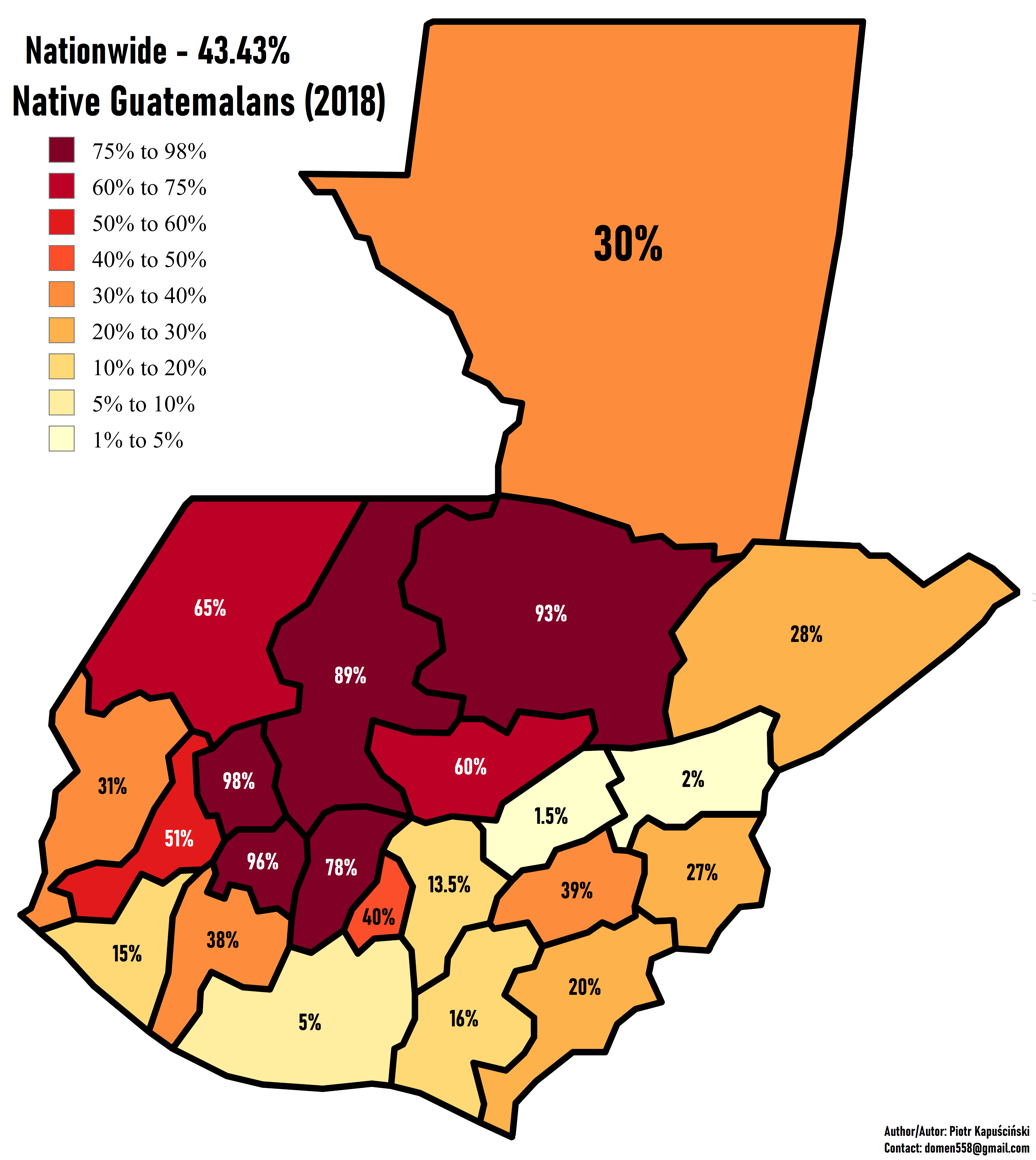
Percentage of Native Guatemalans by department according to the 2018 census

The following is a table of Native populations by department in Guatemala.

Indigenous population in Guatemala by department (2018)
	Department	Ethnic groups	Pop. (Indigenous)	% of pop.
1	Alta Verapaz	Q'eqchi', Poqomchi'	1,129,516	93.0%
2	El Quiché	Kʼicheʼ, Ixil	846,559	89.2%
3	Huehuetenango	Mam, Qʼanjobʼal, Jakaltek	760,915	65.0%
4	Chimaltenango	Kaqchikel	481,572	78.2%
5	Totonicapán	Kʼicheʼ, Mam	410,244	98.0%
6	Quetzaltenango	Kʼicheʼ, Mam	406,697	50.9%
7	Sololá	Kʼicheʼ, Kakchikel, Tz'utujil	406,330	96.4%
8	Guatemala	Kaqchikel	405,758	13.5%
9	San Marcos	Mam	318,169	30.8%
10	Suchitepéquez	Kʼicheʼ	211,313	38.1%
11	Baja Verapaz	Achi	179,809	60.0%
12	Petén	Q'eqchi'	165,014	30.2%
13	Sacatepéquez	Kaqchikel	132,968	40.2%
14	Jalapa	Poqomam	133,420	38.9%
15	Izabal	Q'eqchi'	115,401	28.2%
16	Chiquimula	Chʼortiʼ	111,417	26.8%
17	Jutiapa	Xinca	99,074	20.3%
18	Santa Rosa	Xinca	63,718	16.1%
19	Retalhuleu	K'iche'	48,929	15.0%
20	Escuintla	Poqomam	37,359	5.1%
21	Zacapa		4,815	2.0%
22	El Progreso		2,673	1.5%
	Guatemala		6,471,670	43.4%

== History ==
The earliest proof of human settlement in Guatemala dates back to 10,000 BCE, although some evidence suggests human settlement as early as 18,000 BCE.

== See also ==
- Discrimination against Maya peoples in Guatemala
- Indigenous peoples of North America
