= Elizabeth Weed =

Feminist scholar and university administrator (born 1940)

- Born: 1940 (age 85–86)
- Education: Drew University; Brown University
- Occupations: Scholar; Editor; University administrator
- Known for: differences
- Title: Director, Pembroke Center for Teaching and Research on Women
- Term: 2000–2010

Elizabeth Weed (born 1940) is an American feminist scholar, editor and university administrator. She is the cofounder and, from 2000 to 2010, director of the Pembroke Center for Teaching and Research on Women, as well as the feminist studies journal differences, cofounded in 1989 with Naomi Schor.

== Early life ==
Elizabeth Weed was born in 1940 in Morris Plains, New Jersey, to Marguerite and Edgar Weed. She studied French literature at Drew University, graduating in 1962, and then went to Brown University for her master's (1966) and doctorate (1973) in French Studies.

== Career ==
From 1973 to 1977, Weed was an assistant professor at Wheaton College, and then returned to Brown as director of the Sarah Doyle Women's Center, a position she held from 1977 to 1981. In 1981, she was a cofounder of the Pembroke Center for Teaching and Research on Women, where she eventually became director (2000 to 2010). Discussing the founding of the Pembroke Center and its impact on her own intellectual trajectory, the founding director, historian Joan Wallach Scott, said Weed's dexterity with theory was an important corrective to Scott's historical training: "I continue to think of Elizabeth Weed as my mentor. Her training is in literature. She is one of the most theoretically sophisticated people I know, and she is very good at pointing out the theoretical implications of what you are doing. She is the person I always go to for advice and for critical reading."

During her career at Brown University, Weed wrote over 30 papers for lectures at institutions, and over 20 publications. As of 2014, Weed was retired from teaching.

== differences and edited collections ==
In 1989, Weed cofounded differences: A Journal of Feminist Cultural Studies with Naomi Schor. She published several edited collections that grew out of special editions of the journal, often collaborating with Schor until Schor's death in 2001. Their 1994 collection More Gender Trouble: Feminism Meets Queer Theory collected essays by scholars in dialogue with one another across the two domains but within the book: in it "Judith Butler refers to the work of Biddy Martin; Martin refers to Gayle Rubin's writings; Butler interviews Rubin; Trevor Hope and Rosi Braidotti engage in a three-article conversation with one another based on Hope's critique of an earlier piece of Braidotti's writing; and Elizabeth Grosz and Teresa de Lauretis engage in a similar discussion of Grosz's review/commentary on de Lauretis' [recent work]." In the journal Atlantis, Valda Leighteizer said it might be a "tough slog" for those not already versed in the conversation the collection extends, but "For those who are excited by discussion, who enjoy a passionate roll around with semantics and semiotics, the text is marvelous – a furthering – an adventure in discourse!"

In 2011, with Judith Butler, Weed published an edited collection (also originally a special issues of differences) on the 25th anniversary of Joan Wallach Scott's essay, "Gender: A Useful Category of Historical Analysis". Reviews found the collection offered "fresh analyses of the state of gender studies and the dynamic theories of 'sexual difference' as proposed, tested and critiqued by Joan Scott." Writing in Comparative Literature Studies, Geoffrey Berne highlights the collection's discussions of how Scott's "scholarship relates to the impasse of history/literature", while Stephanie Clare's review for Symposium notes its engagement with Scott's recurrent questions of the historical contingency of gender as well as the paradox that gender may be constructed but feminism's claims rely on a stable conception of gender.

== Personal life ==
While at Brown Weed met Christina Crosby, a graduate student in the late '70s and early '80s, who became Weed's partner for 17 years.

== Influence ==
Levine Querido, an independent children's book publishing company with a focus on diverse voices, was founded by a former student of Weed at Brown, Arthur Levine, who cites Weed as an inspiration for beginning his company, as she introduced him to the influence exposure to diverse stories can have on an individual.

== Works ==
- Weed, Elizabeth, ed. (1989). Coming to Terms: Feminism, Theory, Politics. Routledge. ISBN 978-0-415-63521-9.
- Schor, Naomi; Weed, Elizabeth, eds. (1994). The Essential Difference. Indiana University Press. ISBN 978-0-253-35093-0.
- Schor, Naomi; Weed, Elizabeth, eds. (1994). More Gender Trouble: Feminism Meets Queer Theory. Indiana University Press. ISBN 978-0-253-30015-7.
- Butler, Judith; Weed, Elizabeth, eds. (2011). The Question of Gender: Joan W. Scott's Critical Feminism. Indiana University Press. ISBN 978-0-253-22324-1.
- Weed, Elizabeth (2012). "The Way We Read Now". History of the Present. 2 (1): 95–106. Duke University Press.
- Weed, Elizabeth, ed. (2013). Essential Readings in US Feminist Theory. Nanjing University Press (in Chinese).
- Weed, Elizabeth (2024). Reading the Impossible: Sexual Differences, Critique, and the Stamp of History. Fordham University Press. ISBN 9781531506810.
