= Pembroke Center for Teaching and Research on Women =

Research institute at Brown University

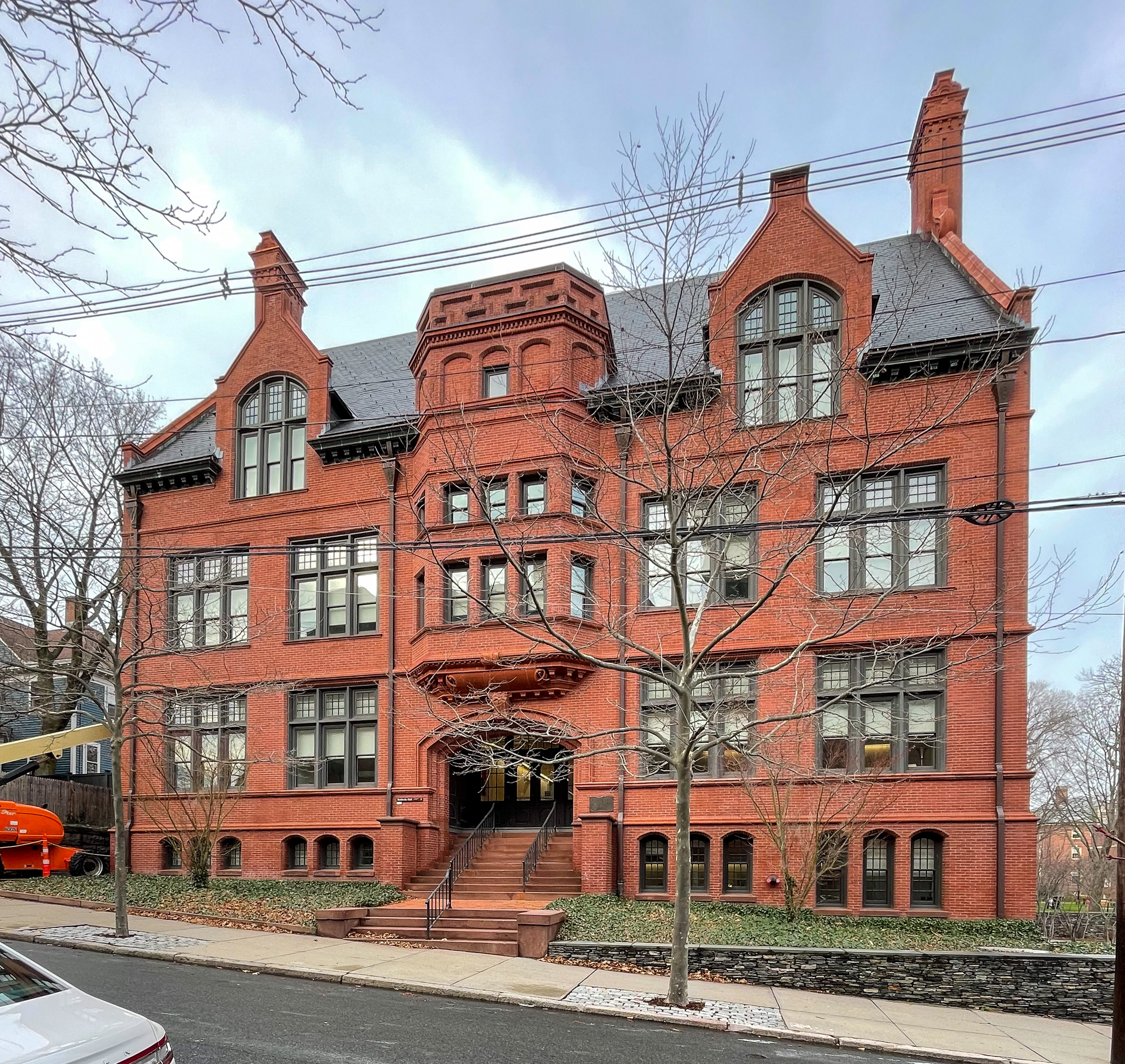
- Pembroke Hall, on the former campus of Pembroke College, serves as the center's home.
- Parent institution: Brown University
- Established: 1981
- Director: Leela Gandhi
- Coordinates: 41.8292°N 71.4028°W
- Website: pembroke.brown.edu

The Pembroke Center for Teaching and Research on Women is an interdisciplinary research center focused on gender and women at Brown University, Providence, Rhode Island. It was established in 1981. In addition to research, the center is home to archives of feminist theory and women's history as well as Brown's undergraduate Gender and Sexuality Studies concentration. Postcolonial theorist Leela Gandhi, is the Center's director, having assumed the position in July 2021.

The Pembroke Center was named in honor of Pembroke College in Brown University, Brown's former coordinate women's college. It is affiliated with Brown's Sarah Doyle Center for Women and Gender.

== History ==
In 1981, a decade following Brown's merger with Pembroke College, the Pembroke Center for Teaching and Research on Women was established. Joan Wallach Scott served as the center's founding director. The Center was initially supported by the Ford Foundation, the National Endowment for the Humanities, and the Rockefeller Foundation, though it now supports its programs largely through its own endowment.

In 2008, the Nanjing–Brown Joint Program in Gender Studies and the Humanities was established as a joint program between the Pembroke Center, Nanjing University and Brown's Cogut Center and East Asian Studies department. The same year, the center moved from Alumnae Hall to Pembroke Hall, following the building's renovation by architect Toshiko Mori. In 2016, the Center established the Black Feminist Theory Project, which focuses on rotating professorships and scholars in residence.

The Pembroke Center received a $5 million gift in June 2021, permanently endowing the Center's directorship. The announcement of the gift coincided with Leela Gandhi's appointment as director.

=== Directors ===
- Joan Wallach Scott (1981–1985)
- Barbara A. Babcock (1986–1987)
- Karen Newman (1987–1993)
- Ellen Rooney (1992–2000)
- Elizabeth Weed (2000–2010)
- Kay Warren (2011–2014)
- Suzanne Stewart-Steinberg (2014–2021)
- Leela Gandhi (2021–)

== Research and teaching ==
The Pembroke Center offers a broad range of research, teaching, and alumnae/i programs. The Center's work to preserve the history of women at Brown and in Rhode Island and feminist theory scholarship has produced the Christine Dunlap Farnham Archive and the Feminist Theory Archive.

=== Concentration ===
In fall 2006, the gender studies program merged with the concentration in Sexuality and Society to form the Gender and Sexuality Studies Program. Gender and Sexuality Studies is an interdisciplinary concentration that examines the construction of gender and sexuality in social, cultural, political, economic, or scientific contexts. Each concentrator will focus on a well-defined topic or question and work closely with a concentration advisor to develop a program that investigates this focus area rigorously and supplements it with foundational courses in the relevant disciplines.

Typical areas of focus might include the acculturation of gender, sexuality and race in American politics or activism; the construction of sexual and gendered identities in educational institutions or in various forms of visual media; a contrast between different cultural understandings of sexual identity, a particular national literature and history.

=== Pembroke seminar ===
The weekly Pembroke Seminar brings together Pembroke Center postdoctoral fellows, faculty research fellows, graduate fellows, other interested Brown faculty and selected students, affiliated visiting scholars, and distinguished guest lecturers. The research themes of the seminar change annually.

=== Postdoctoral fellowships ===
The Pembroke Center annually supports three or four postdoctoral research fellows in residence for an academic year.

=== Scholarly publication ===
Differences: A Journal of Feminist Cultural Studies was established in 1989 at the moment of a critical encounter of theories of difference (primarily continental) and the politics of diversity (primarily American). The journal provides a critical forum where the problematic of differences is explored in texts ranging from the literary and the visual to the political and social. differences highlights theoretical debates across the disciplines that address the ways concepts and categories of difference (notably but not exclusively gender) operate within culture. It is published three times a year by Duke University Press.

== Pembroke Center archives ==
Housed in the John Hay Library, the Christine Dunlap Farnham Archive focus on 19th and 20th-century Brown and Rhode Island women and their organizations. In addition to correspondence, diaries, photographs, newspapers, yearbooks, and memorabilia, it also includes a collection of oral history tapes and videos. The materials on women are located throughout the University archives and special collections. There is a 500-page Research Guide to the Christine Dunlap Farnham Archive which includes more than 1,000 entries describing the collection.

The Feminist Theory Archive, established in 2003 with the papers of the late Naomi Schor, preserves the legacies of prominent scholars of women, gender and sexuality. Its mission is to collect, arrange, describe, preserve, and make accessible the work of leading feminist theorists beginning in the 1960s. The archive holds the papers of a number of noted academics, including Silvia Federici, Anne Fausto-Sterling, Jacqueline Bhabha, Lauren Berlant, and Seyla Benhabib.

== Pembroke Center Associates ==
The Pembroke Center Associates is a membership organization that was founded in 1983 to secure the programs of the Center. It is a group of dedicated alumnae/i and friends who offer engaging programs to alumnae/i, students, and the community; publicize Pembroke Center activities through a newsletter, the Pembroke Center Associates and other publications; present the Leadership for Change through Education Award to leaders who have made a difference through education; and support the academic and research programs of the Pembroke Center through their annual membership contributions. In addition, the Associates has established a financial endowment that augments the Center's budget.

The Associates also sponsor a forum on commencement week-end on topics of interest to alumni.

The Pembroke Center Associates Council is the advisory board of the Associates. Members of the council are elected annually on a rotating basis for three-year terms. The Council, which meets three times a year on the Brown campus, is composed of committees that recommend initiatives for action by the Associates.
