= Bruno Perreau =

French political scientist (born 1976)

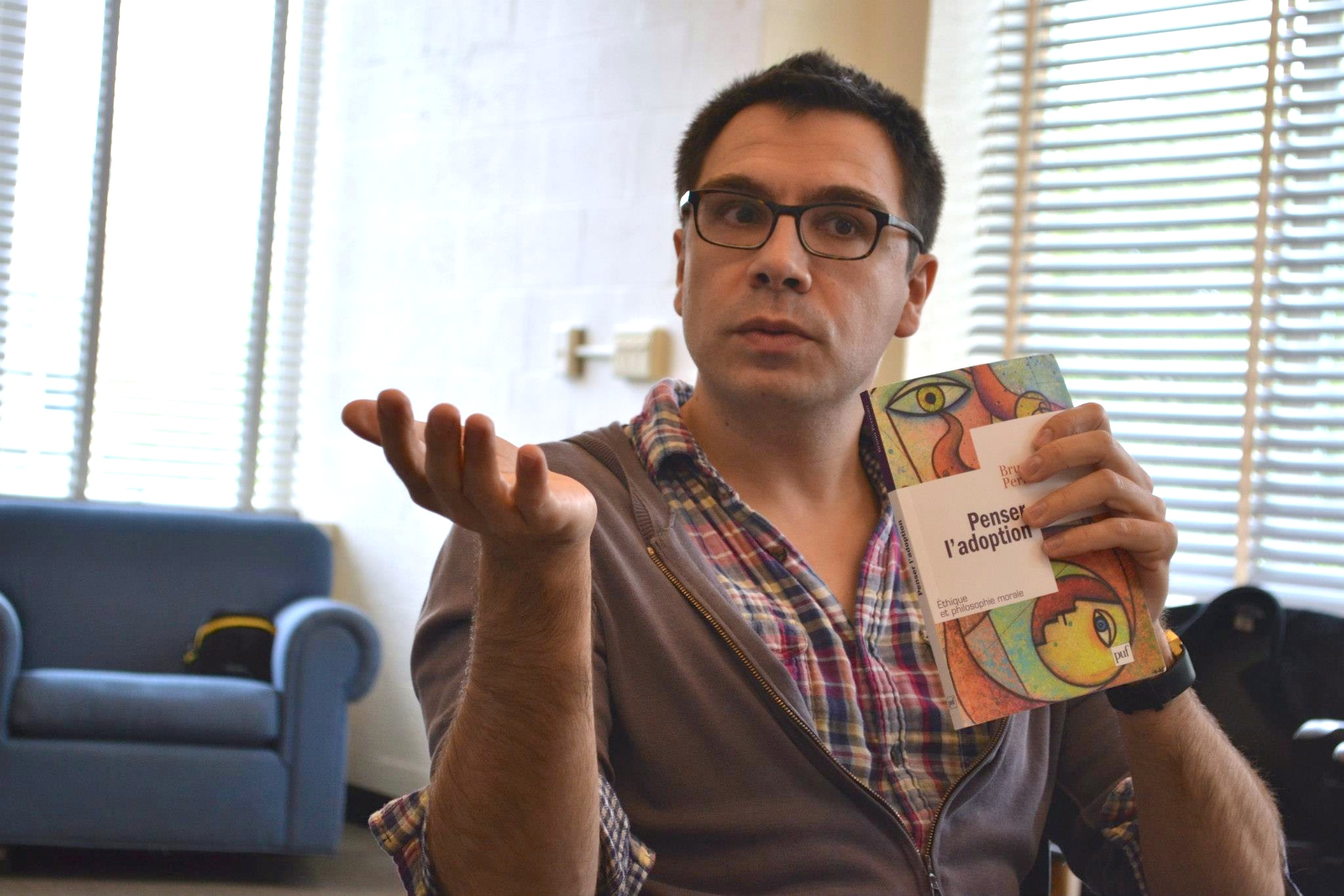
- Perreau at the MIT Women's and Gender Studies Intellectual Forum in June 2012, holding his book Penser l'adoption. La gouvernance pastorale du genre
- Born: 15 December 1976 (age 49); Burgundy, France
- Occupation: Professor of French Studies
- Scientific career
- Fields: Social and cultural theory, gender and sexuality, law and politics
- Workplaces: Massachusetts Institute of Technology

Bruno Perreau (PhD, Paris I Sorbonne; born December 15, 1976) is the Cynthia L. Reed Professor of French Studies at the Massachusetts Institute of Technology. He is also Faculty Associate at the Minda de Gunzburg Center for European Studies, Harvard University.

Perreau is founder and director of MIT's French+ Initiative, which "gathers scholars working across the humanities and social sciences, whose research and teaching centre on the French and francophone cultures and societies." The French+ Initiative joined the “Center of Excellence in French Studies” network in 2022.

Perreau taught political science, law, and gender studies at Sciences Po, where he opened with Françoise Gaspard the first undergraduate course on LGBT politics in France. He contributed to the university's affirmative action program and set a new system of academic advising for international students.

Perreau was a member of the Princeton Institute for Advanced Study, a Newton fellow in sociology and a Jesus College research associate at the University of Cambridge, and more recently a fellow at Stanford Humanities Center. He was also a Burkhardt fellow at the Stanford Center for Advanced Study in the Behavioral Sciences, and a visiting scholar in the department of comparative literature at the University of California, Berkeley.

Intersecting the humanities and the social sciences, Perreau's work covers how the law is manufactured in contemporary Western societies. How are juridical categories instituted, and once they are, why do they seem so obvious? While the law is often thought of as nothing more than a technique, Perreau explores its social, political and aesthetic foundations: what conditions have to be in place for a policy to be successful and become law? His work shows that “nature” is one of the main registers undergirding the manufacture of law in contemporary Western societies. Perreau maintains that our relationship with the community, a relationship commonly designated as “culture,” is understood as if it were a “second nature.” Perreau's research often starts with an epistemological line of inquiry. He asks how our daily lives have been marked by this construct of nature, whether in terms of our nationality, our relations to family, our social tastes, or our identities?

== The Politics of Adoption ==
In his book The Politics of Adoption: Gender and the Making of French Citizenship (Basic Bioethics) Perreau discusses the politics surrounding adoption in France. In France, the process for authorizing an adoption is understood as a “moment of truth” over the course of which administrative categories and social identities enter into a confrontation. Gender is a crucial aspect of this encounter, and the decision to accept or reject an application (by a single man, a woman past menopause, a homosexual person, a married couple, etc.) gives insight into what constitutes a legitimate family in France. To understand how the production of the family and the production of the state are linked, The Politics of Adoption offers a study of parliamentary debates since 1945 alongside French and European case law. It also casts light on social work through a statistical analysis of the different types of justification offered by child social welfare agents when surveyed on the topic of homosexual people who apply for adoption. Perreau's contention is that adoption policies evidence a pastoral power: candidates are not evaluated for what they are but for what they should be. The state is considered a guide for its citizens who wish to become parents because the state needs them to produce young citizens who fully acknowledge its authority. Philosopher Judith Butler said that it provides "a way of understanding adoption policy as no less than a way of rearticulating political modernity."

== Queer theory in France ==
Perreau's most recent research discusses various facets of the French response to queer theory, from the mobilisation of activists and the seminars of scholars to the emergence of queer media and translations. It sheds new light on recent events around gay marriage in France, where opponents to the 2013 law saw queer theory as a threat to the French family. Perreau questions the return of French Theory to France from the standpoint of queer theory, thereby exploring the way France conceptualises America. By examining mutual influences across the Atlantic, he seeks to reflect on changes in the idea of national identity in France and the United States, offering insight on recent attempts to theorise the notion of “community” in the wake of Maurice Blanchot's work. Queer Theory: The French Response offers a theory of minority politics that considers an ongoing critique of norms as the foundation of citizenship, in which a feeling of belonging arises from regular reexamination of it.

== Minority democracy ==
Currently, he focuses on the legal interface between minority and majority cultures, researching the possibility of a 'minority democracy.' Minorities, who experience both exclusion and conditional assimilation (or 'passing'), challenge the clarity of the majority's relationship to the law, especially in the area of political representation. He explores precedents ranging from Condorcet's social mathematics to affirmative action in the United States and France. This new approach brings his previous research into the development of a sense of belonging to bear on the way society conceptualises legal rights. Minority democracy would not entail a mode of decision-making that replaces majority rule by minority rule, but rather a system that recognises the minority dimension existing in all of us. Perreau coined the concept of intrasectionality to refer to the presence of others in each of us. He concludes that the way in which each individual is treated, particularly by the law, depends on the treatment of others. The result is a solidarist vision of identity that moves away from the more fragmentary approach promoted by the notion of intersectionality. Perreau thus offers a new theory of justice by connecting all experiences of injustice.

== Books ==
- Spheres of Injustice. The Ethical Promise of Minority Presence The MIT Press, 2025.
- Sphères d'injustice. Pour un universalisme minoritaire La Découverte, 2023.
- Qui a peur de la théorie queer? Presses de Sciences Po, 2018.
- Queer Theory: The French Response. Stanford University Press, 2016.
- The Politics of Adoption. Gender and the Making of French Citizenship. The MIT Press, 2014.
- Penser l'adoption. La gouvernance pastorale du genre. Presses Universitaires de France, 2012.
- Le Président des États-Unis (with Christine Ockrent). Dalloz, 2008.
- Cinquante ans de vie politique française. Le débat sur la fin de la Cinquième République. Librio, 2007.
- Homosexualité. Dix clés pour comprendre, vingt textes à découvrir. Forewords Jack Lang, Librio, 2005.

== Edited books ==
- Oxford Encyclopedia of LGBT Politics and Policy (Associate Editor for political theory. General Editor: Donald P. Haidel-Marker). Oxford University Press, 3 volumes, 2021.
- Les Défis de la République. Genre, territoires, citoyenneté (with Joan W. Scott). Presses de Sciences Po, 2017.
- Le Choix de l'homosexualité. Recherches inédites sur la question gay et lesbienne. EPEL, 2007.
- Homoparentalités. Approches scientifiques et politiques (with Anne Cadoret, Martine Gross and Caroline Mécary). Forewords Bertrand Delanoë, Presses universitaires de France, 2006.
