= Pan-Maya movement =

Ethno-political movement

The Pan-Mayan Movement is an ethno-political movement among the Maya peoples of Guatemala and Mexico. The movement emerged in the late 1980s and early 1990s in response to a long tradition of the political marginalization of the large Indigenous population of Guatemala, and particularly in response to the violent counter-insurgency policies that disproportionately affected Indigenous communities during the Guatemalan Civil War. The movement was organized around an ideology seeking to unite the speakers of Guatemala's many Mayan languages under a single shared cultural/ethnic identity. It was an alternative to either of the parties of the civil war - the communist revolutionaries and the conservative government. Indigenous Mayan linguists trained by North American linguists in the Proyecto linguistico Francisco Marroquin played a major role in organizing the movement. With the 1996 peace accords the movement gained a significant position in Guatemalan politics.

== Background ==
The Pan-Mayan Movement consists of the collaborative action of more than 20 different Maya language groups. Although the Indigenous people of Guatemala make up about half of the total population of the country, they are unrepresented and highly discriminated against.

Unification was difficult during a repressive civil war, which helped keep the Mayans fragmented. Mayan organizations were usually local organizations catering to a small group of the population, mostly those in the same language group. Barriers to unification included the diversity of languages, which made it hard to coordinate within the Indigenous population. Geographic barriers include the lack of concentration of the Maya in one region of Guatemala and the majority of the population living in rural areas, which makes physical coordination difficult. Finally socioeconomic barriers include high poverty rates and fewer resources than other ethnic groups in the nation.

=== Mobilization ===
The Pan-Mayan Movement was officially mobilized when organizations started making explicitly Indigenous claims. These organizations focused on creating Pan-Mayanism, uniting the diverse population of Mayan people throughout the nation. The organizations vouched for political autonomy, linguistic preservation, access to land and cultural revitalization.

The movement arose along with the rise of other Indigenous movements across Latin America. The movement broke away from former Indigenous activism that emerged through peasant organizations but did not make ethnic claims. They have previously joined peasant organizations because creating organizations with explicitly Indigenous claims allowed them to be easy targets for discrimination. The international support for Indigenous rights at the time helped change that.

== Peace Talks ==
The Pan-Mayan Movement gained strength at the end of a brutal civil war when international pressure had pushed for peace talks in the nation of Guatemala. The peace talks of the early 1990s created an opportunity for Mayan social movements to expand and Pan-Mayanism to succeed. International and nongovernmental organizations saw the need for advocate for human rights for the Indigenous population in Guatemala. They helped create pressure on the Guatemalan government in allowing the movement to be part of the peace talks as well as defending the interests of the movement. The Pan-Mayan movement was limited before the peace talks as it occurred during the nation’s civil war, which created genocidal state violence where the victims were largely of Indigenous descent. International actors helped highlight the violence that the Mayan community was exposed to.

By 1992, the movement had been nationally recognized as a political actor. Umbrella organizations such as the Coordinadora de Organizaciones del Pueblo Maya (Coordinator of Organizations of the Maya People of Guatemala, COPMAGUA) were created in order to unify organizations under one political roof. This helped better highlight issues that affected the Indigenous communities as a whole.

=== 1996 Peace Accords ===
In 1996 the last 17 peace accords were signed after nine years. The process was considered a model due to civil society having a formal consultative role, which was never seen before in peace talks. Indigenous issues and rights became a central issue of the peace talks and the signing of the peace accords symbolized the height of the movement. International organizations that supported the movement also played a role in engaging in the peace accords and pushing for change in Guatemala. The peace accords included an accord on Indigenous rights, the Accord on Identity and Rights of Indigenous Peoples, which was signed in 1995. This accord called Guatemala a multiethnic, multicultural, and multilingual nation and called for reforms to help the Indigenous populations. Parts of The Indigenous Rights Accords required constitutional reforms to be implemented, which were later faced with high opposition.

=== Aftermath ===
Ethnic inequalities still are high over a decade after the peace accords have been signed. Child malnutrition among the Indigenous population in Guatemala is almost 70%. Poverty is still high in rural areas where most of the Indigenous population resides; rural poverty is at about 42% compared to 29% nationwide.

The political influence of these Mayan organizations has subsided in the last decade. Along with the difficulty of uniting regional and linguistic differences in the group, internal splits have occurred in the organizations due to politico-ideological lines as well as religious ones. Organization sectorization has risen, where each organization focuses on a specific issue, which resulted in blocking a development of a common political agenda. The end of the peace talks ended the common political agenda that made the movement strong in the mid-1990s. The Coordinadora de Organizaciones del Pueblo Maya (Coordinator of Organizations of the Maya People of Guatemala, COPMAGUA) only lasted six years due to internal divisions.

==== Localism ====
The defeat of the constitutional referendum in 1999 symbolized a decline in the political strength of the movement. The movement became more fragmented on what to do next. In 2001 a series of meetings took place in order to address the different views on parliamentary politics. Former difficulties arose in uniting the different Maya people at this time and many felt that they needed to focus on more local change and return to the grassroots. 43% of Mayas only speak their native language and many activists believed that it would be more beneficial to keep organizations on a local level.

Major national parties since the peace accords have not been responsive to the demands of the movement and the accords. Self-identified Indigenous representatives in congress are still low; since the 1980s, Indigenous congressional representation only rose from 8.0% to 13.9%. Even those self-identified Indigenous representatives have not moved forward in working on the goals of the movement. The lack of higher representation may be due to the discrimination and violence that has made Indigenous members fearful of taking part of politics.

Since the peace accords the movement has focused more on creating awareness for the culture. Indigenous political leaders, on a national and departmental level, have stayed away from addressing socioeconomic issues and ethnic discrimination facing the Indigenous populations. Local level leaders on the other hand have had more success pushing for more ethnic rights as they are usually responding to populations where the majority are Indigenous and therefore willing to accept and promote those rights. Disconnects between the local, departmental and national levels of government makes representation at higher levels more difficult even though local Indigenous representation has grown.

== Sources ==
- Warren, Kay B. 2000. “Pan-Mayanism and the Guatemalan Peace Process.” In, Christopher Chase-Dunn, Susanne Jonas and Nelson Amaro, eds., Globalization on the Ground: Postbellum Guatemalan Democracy and Development, pp. 145–166.
- Warren, Kay B. 2001.“Mayan Cultural Activism in Guatemala.” In, Davíd Carrasco, ed., The Oxford Encyclopedia of Mesoamerican Cultures. New York: Oxford University Press.
- Warren, Kay B. and Jean Jackson. 2005. “Indigenous Movements in Latin America, 1992-2004: Controversies, Ironies, New Directions.” Annual Review of Anthropology 34, (2005):549-573.
- Warren, Kay B. and Jean Jackson. 2002. Indigenous Movements, Self-Representation, and the State. Co-edited with Jean Jackson. Austin: University of Texas Press, 2002.
- Warren, Kay B. 1998. Indigenous Movements and Their Critics: Pan-Maya Activism in Guatemala. Princeton: Princeton University Press, 1998.
