= Discrimination against Maya peoples in Guatemala =

The Maya community makes up 51% of the population of Guatemala. Although a few dozen cultural groups inhabited the area, they were considered one Maya culture under the Spanish Empire. Under colonial Spanish rule, the Maya people were forced to leave their homelands, work as slaves for the Spanish colonists, and convert to Christianity.

Although Spanish colonial rule in Guatemala ended in 1821, the oppression of the Maya community continued. Following independence, the Ladino community took control of the social, economic, and political hierarchies within Guatemala. Throughout the seventeenth century, the Ladino population forced the Indigenous communities to be forms of slaves or cheap labor, to give up their lands, and assimilate into Guatemalan society.

While there was social relief for the Maya community in the mid-eighteenth century, this was ended by the 1954 U.S-backed military coup that directly led to the Guatemalan Civil War, which is now widely considered a genocide carried out by the Guatemalan government against the Maya population.

Although the Civil War ended with the 1996 Peace Accords, Maya oppression within Guatemala still continues through the economic, social, and political disparities the Indigenous peoples face. While the Pan-Maya movement has attempted to establish equality for the Maya people, there is still debate over the amount of success the movement has achieved.

== Historical oppression ==
=== Colonial oppression ===
Until their conquest by the Spanish Empire, the Indigenous Maya identity was not unified, but separated amongst different Indigenous groups such as the Kaqchikel, the Mam, the K'iche, and the Tz'utujil. Using pre-existing conflicts, namely over territory, the Spanish used the divide and conquered tactic in order to achieve military victory over the Indigenous peoples.

Shortly after the Spanish conquest of Guatemala in 1524 brought by Pedro de Alvarado, the Spanish began to use the Indigenous people as a labor force to construct the pueblos de indios. The Spanish forcibly relocated the Indigenous people to the pueblos and put them under the control and administration of the Spanish Empire. The Spanish Empire allocated parceled lands to each community of peoples in order to provide subsistence and pay tribute to the empire in the form of taxes, cacao, maze and other agricultural products grown in the pueblos. The Empire also forced the communities to supply "reparto" where 1/3 of the Indigenous male populations from each community were made to work on Spanish plantations and haciendas. This male workforce would rotate with other male residents every 9 months.

While under the Spanish Empire, Mayas still garnered their own traditions, culture and religion. Nevertheless, the presence of the colonial rule interrupted many aspects of Indigenous life. One of the disruptions came from the Spanish induced social hierarchy which ranked citizens based on a racial caste system. The white citizens, or the blanks, held the highest status. The lowest status was held by the Mayas, or los Indios, and the black citizens and slaves, or los negros. However, in relation to los negros, los Indios was even lower on the totem pole. It was customary to remind the Indigenous people of this by using black men as a whipping post. This furthered the horror the Indigenous people felt towards the Spanish Empire using the idea that the black man was holding the Mayas down. One's status was determined by the purity of their blood line. People of mixed descent soon came to have the status of castas. Those of mixed Indigenous and European descent were not subject to all of the harsh realities that purely Indigenous people were.

Another type of disruption came from religious tensions. With the introduction of the Spanish Empire also came the imposition of Christian doctrine on the Maya communities. Christianity was taught in the pueblos, yet not greatly accepted until near the end of colonial rule in Guatemala. This was, in part, due to the oppression Indigenous people faced at the hands of the church and local administrations. By the 1550s, Indigenous communities began to write to the Spanish Empire to petition for relief from the harsh Spanish administration. These petitions would usually address high-ranking Spaniards and report on the struggles that the Indigenous communities faced under the empire. However, when authority figured from both the church and local government found out about the petition written, they would threaten the Mayas with skinning and burning them alive in order to force a retraction of the petition. This who wrote the petition would usually flee from the pueblos to escape punishment. A Catholic priest who visited different pueblos to report on the general acceptance of Christian doctrine amongst the Indigenous population states that "While the Indians ratify the petition, the priest threaten them, the mayors imprison and beat them, everyone tells them they'll be treated worse later and...the priest and the mayors end up vindicated.

Under the rule of Alvarado, an estimated 5 million Maya lives were lost due to many reasons such as slaughters, violence and injury, and, namely, disease (especially measles). In a letter from numerous Guatemalan Utatecan chiefs in Jocotenango, it was reported how the children were being abused, kidnapped and sold into slavery. Alongside this, the Indigenous populations suffered greatly, were beaten, and asked to pay so much in tribute to the crown that they were left impoverished. The macehules were forced into slave labor and the ones who were imprisoned were sold to Spanish households as more free labor.

The 1800s saw the ascension of the Bourbon Dynasty to the Spanish throne and the descension of Spanish colonial rule in Central America. With an increasing number of revolts across all of Central American and Northern Mexico, the Spanish Empire attempted to strengthen its rule by becoming even stricter with regards to controlling every aspect of colonial life. Nevertheless, as regional commerce increased and, alongside it, the wealth of Creole elites, the Spanish colonial holdings grew weaker and weaker. The Creole population also increased their aggression towards the Maya population. The elites began extracting more labor, revenue and land from the Mayas. In response to the increase aggression from the colonial elites, Maya likewise increase their aggression in rebelling against colonial rule. A series of at least 50 major Indigenous riots occurred from 1710 to the year of Guatemalan independence from colonial rule, 1821. These revolts were influences by the Mexican Revolution in 1819, led by Miguel Hildago, as well as the French Revolution and the Haitian Revolution.

One of the largest uprisings was the Totonicapan Uprising of 1820 led by Atanasio Tzul and Lucas Aguilar. The Indigenous people held off the colonial troops for almost half a year. After hearing that the Constitution of 1812 set to be reinstated in 1816, which would bring back forced Indigenous labor and tribute payments to the Spanish crown, the K'iche people in Santa Maria Chiquimula and other neighboring cities took a stand and scared off and colonial authorities who demanded tribute payment. From April to June 1820, the rebels consolidated in San Miguel and publicly declares control over the town. On August 3, 1820, the rebellion was brought to an end when the Spanish army charged the town with little to no opposition from the Indigenous rebels. The Spanish army captured and imprisoned the movement's leaders. This revolt was reinforced Indigenous power and autonomy at the local level.

=== Post-colonial oppression ===
The conclusion of colonial authority in Guatemala did not signify the cessation of oppression for the Maya people. The post-independence era witnessed a span of two decades marked by political conflict between the Liberal and Conservative factions within Guatemalan society. The Liberal faction, consisting of middle-class urban and provincial elites, advocated for modernization and the curtailment of ecclesiastical power. In contrast, the Conservative faction, representing the former colonial merchant class and government aristocracy, aimed to perpetuate colonial hierarchies and safeguard ecclesiastical influence. Certain Liberal-driven reforms had the effect of diminishing Maya autonomy, particularly through the privatization of lands held by Maya communities. By the year 1837, a countryside uprising led by Rafael Carrera ushered in a period of neocolonial Catholic rule. This resurgence of church authority further diminished Indigenous autonomy.

Forced labor returned with the emergence of the Planter class in the 1860s. This era saw the increase in coffee production. The increased demand for coffee resulted in the increased demand for land and labor, and, thus, increased oppression of Indigenous populations. The Liberal Revolution of 1871 consisted of a series of laws passed by the Guatemalan government that intruded on the autonomy of Maya communities and brought Indigenous back forced labor. In Decree 177, Mayas had to draft labor from their communities. Laborers were sent 60 at a time to coffee plantations to work in 15–30 day increments. Many different laws were passed at the benefit of the plantation owners to help them to control the Indigenous laborers and increase their landholdings and profits. These laws saw a deepened divide between the Maya and Ladino communities.

The idea of "ladinización" or "ladi" also emerged in the 1860s. This was the idea that Mayas could become Ladinos by giving up aspects of their identity that made them Maya. Although later condemned as "cultural genocide", this notion of Maya assimilation into Guatemalan society was believed to be good for both the Maya community and the nation's health overall.

Much remained the same throughout the end of the nineteenth century. The main focus of the Ladinos was to maintain control over the Maya. As a long-lasting effect of colonialism, many in Guatemalan society believed that the Mayas were the inferior population and didn't have the ability to assimilate to the white culture of the government. The industrial revolution weakened ties even further between the Maya communities and Guatemalan government. The Liberals pushed for the building of a railroad and other North American commodities which would, in turn, decrease the autonomy and amount of land that the Mayas had. The Liberals increasingly blames the Mayas for the lack of economic growth in Guatemala due to their tendency to choose to abide by tradition ways of life. Over the course of the twentieth century, tensions only furthered as Mayas became viewed with more and more negativity. Moreover, with the introduction of international corporations, such as the United Fruit Company, Indigenous people, most of whom were impoverished, became a major part of the exploited work force.

The "Guatemalan Democratic Spring" of the 1940s saw the greatest hope for change for the Maya peoples. With the rise to power of President Juan Jose Arevalo came the introduction of the rights of the peasants. The first national policy of land reform came in the early 1940s. The goal of this reform was to help peasants improve their economic status through the implementation of minimum wage laws and some land redistribution. Arevalo's predecessor, President Jacobo Arbenz, was elected in 1951. He pushed for even more radical change, such as the Congressional decree 900 in 1952. This decree redistributed unused land.

While the Maya and peasant population supported Arbenz's policies, the elites and foreign companies did not. The United Fruit Company pressured the United States government to get rid of Arbenz. In response, the United States Central Intelligence Agency supported a Guatemalan coup in 1954 that removed Arbenz from power. Arbenz was replaced by a military regime under Carlos Castillos Armas. This coup resulted in 36 years of violence between the military-installed regime and guerrilla movements known as the Guatemalan Civil War.

=== Guatemalan Civil War ===
The Guatemalan Civil War lasted from 1960 until 1996. After the coup of 1954, political activism amongst Indigenous and peasant communities became more radical. The first of the guerrilla forces emerged in the 1960s. The introduction of guerrilla forced led to an increase in governmental repression. There began to be "political disappearances" of guerrilla members and their supported. By the end of the 1970s, open civil war was waged in Guatemala.

The 1960s and 1970s also saw the introduction of the "Liberation Theology." This ideology used biblical principals to support solidarity with poor communities, the critique of capitalism and local development projects. Many young Mayas joined this ideology.

The government induced violence of the civil war took place in stages. Until 1981, the killings were selective. The government mainly focused on guerrilla and Maya political leaders. However, in 1981 and the election of Efrain Rios Montt came the Scorched Earth Policy. This form of counter insurgency was indiscriminate between guerrilla forces and Maya citizens. During what was known as the "Victory '82" campaign, the Guatemalan military committed over 600 massacres, with some killing as many as 300–400 Mayas, and displaced millions of Maya citizens. Victory '82 was followed by "Firmness '83" and "Renewal '84," which were campaigns that sought the militarized reconstruction of the Maya highland regions.

Another campaign that targeted Mayas was Plan Sofia which characterized Mayas as terrorist guerrillas and their homes, as well as sacred grounds, as guerrilla operation bases. In the log, the Plan did not specifically state that there had been massacres of Maya, but instead used phrases of defeating the enemy such as "burning the enemy's house" or "taking away 80% of guerrilla support". Such atrocities included murdering pregnant women, slaughtering domestic animals, and placing mines in several communities. The log highlighted how the military placed grenades under the bellies of pigs and how slaughtered dogs were left hanging in the house to "teach the subversive a lesson". Its real purpose was to eliminate any social and political agency of Maya people as part of the army's racialized genocide campaign, as well as to transform and colonize the Maya highlands into a militarized territory that the government could control and contain them. Unfortunately, this labeling of the Mayas as "subversive" has persisted into modern discourse that blame Maya people for hindering development in the country.

The genocide was also framed as a gendered and racialized femicide as soldiers committed atrocities against Maya women to remove their sociopolitical agency and to construct a patriarchal racial hierarchy. Soldiers raped many women, especially those along "the Red Zone" and then eventually killed with the justification that women would have offspring who would become Communists (pregnant women would also be raped and killed as soldiers sliced their womb with bayonets). Rape, torture and massacre of Maya women was a tool used by soldiers to reinforce their hetero-masculinity. For example, in the community of Rio Negro, Baja Vasquez, soldiers forced women to dance and to play marimba in front of the men before raping them and eventually executing 70 women alongside 107 children.

Maya women's children were targeted because they were treated as "bad seed" to the armed forces and military government, meaning that the perpetrators conceptualized the children as objects who will ruin the natural world and bring something evil to the country. As a result, Maya girls were also targeted by the military forces, as in the case of the El K'iche community where Juana and Francisca Sales Ortiz were executed in their house after the soldiers forced them to dance while eating the family's food. When the family returned, they found the girls' bodies buried in improvised graves, as if they were never given proper burial.

Cultural genocide was also enforced by the armed forces who implemented a social re-education program for Maya survivors The Ixil Operation Manual provides a "psychological campaign to rescue the Ixil mentality" in which Maya were to be taught Western and Christian value, while those who practiced liberation theology or a variant of Maya Catholicism. Spiritual guides in the community were executed, and this was a cultural-political punishment as the guides were teachers of Maya spirituality, so their execution was the removal of Maya traditions. One case was in the community of El K'iche in 1980 where military forces had the people gather at a ceremonial ground and had five elder Ajquijab decapitated for practicing "magic rites", which was viewed as cutting off the leaders of the community and the loss of intergenerational teachings of Maya teaching.

Soldiers portrayed non-Christian Maya leaders as not only as "subversives", but as sorcerers who served "Satan", which the soldiers felt justified in killing the leaders and sending them to "hell". Elga Martinez Salazar notes that these killings were social exorcism, as if the armed forces were killing bugs that harm the body, or in this scenario, the nation. To the former General Gramajo, the massacres were "recuperation" and part of a rebirth program that required violently distorting Maya teachings in the name of "national salvation". The armed forces disregarded traditional Maya customs and teachings through the murders of spiritual leaders and even appropriating names to their soldiers (the name of Kaibil Balam, a Maya warrior who could not be captured by Spanish conquerors, was given to soldiers trained by the US Green Berets). By disregarding and discriminating Maya traditions, the armed forces created a narrative that justified their mass killings while erasing any trace of non-Christian and non-Western practices in the country.

The Guatemalan government was not the only part committing acts of violence. Mayas saw threats from both sides of the civil war, the guerrillas and the government. By 1981, the government regime targeted all Mayas as subversives, namely because of their history of struggle against the government and their general support of Arbenz's policies (which were widely viewed as communist policies). If Maya communities decided to support the army, the community was targeted by guerrillas and vice versa.

The Guatemalan Civil was brought to an end by the 1996 Peace Accords. The civil war directly led to the genocide of an estimated 200,000 Mayas and the displacement of many more. The Guatemalan Historical Clarification Commission (CEH) stated that about 93% of the human rights violations of the civil war were carried out by the state. Three percent were committed by the guerrilla forces and 4% of the human rights violations were carried out by other, non identified actors.

Mayas made up 83% of the civil war's victims. Most of the victims were concentrated in the Guatemalan northern and north-western highlands where there was a majority Maya population.

==== 1996 Peace Accords ====
The 1996 Peace Accords, signed on December 12, 1996, by the Guatemalan government and guerrilla rebels, formally ended the Guatemalan Civil War. During the time of the Peace Accords and the decade immediately after, 1996 – 2006, there was an increase in global support for Indigenous rights. The Mayas were represented by COPMAGUA.

The Peace Accords were made up of 3 accords. The first was the "Commission for Historical Clarification Accord." This accord establish a commission of three people to clarify and report on the human rights violations of the civil war. The commission was made up of three actors: the present Moderator of the peace negotiations who was appointed the United Nations' Secretary General. A citizen of Guatemala chosen by the Moderator and an academic chosen by the Moderator from a list proposed by university presidents.

The second accord was the "Indigenous Rights Accord." This accord focused on recognizing the importance of the Maya identity to Guatemala. This accord also realize Maya discrimination and worked to make racial discrimination illegal. Alongside this, the accord worked to increase the rights of the Maya people as well as the inclusion of Maya culture and political ideals in Guatemalan society.

The final accord was the "Socio-Economic Accord." This accord worked to increase civic participation in governmental affairs at all levels, but mainly the municipal level. This accord also worked to outline future prospects for economic goals through rural developments and new fiscal policies.

== Modern oppression ==
While the 1996 Peace Accords ended decades of armed conflict in Guatemala, it did not bring a complete end to oppression for the Maya peoples. Although the Peace Accords stressed increased participation of the Maya peoples in governmental processes, according to researcher Nicholas Copeland, Mayas have still been less inclined to participate in progressive movements than their other Indigenous counterparts throughout the Americas. Those that do participate in these progressive movements, even with the help of NGOs and INGOs, face threats of state and parastate violence. However, a report by Global Americans in 2017 argued that this lack of political representation for Indigenous people in Guatemala is mainly due to internal strife, stating that "tensions between and within the left in Guatemala (which exist to this day) are undoubtedly responsible for the UNRG's lack of electoral success." Only 19 Mayas were reported to have served in Guatemala's Congress during the 2016–2020 legislative term.

Furthermore, there are social disparities that remain in Guatemalan society as of 2008. A study conducted in 2014 regarding the wealth gap within Guatemala reported that 75% of the Indigenous population of Guatemala is still poor, with 30% living in extreme poverty. Alongside this, there has been an increase in criminal violence and lynching in Maya communities as of 2007. While some argue that this increase in lynching is due to Indigenous customary law, others believe that the lynchings have been brought about by a lack of trust in the police and justice systems within Guatemala. This has led to a wave of immigration of Maya youth from Guatemala to the United States.

=== Pan-Maya Movement ===
Although oppression still continues, some Mayas have found support from the Pan-Maya Movement. The Pan-Maya Movement is motivated by Pan-Mayaism. Other names for the movement include the "Maya Movement," "Maya Revitalization Movement" and "Movimiento Maya'' (as the Indigenous peoples call it). The Pan Maya Movement is said to represent the "organized Maya," which is one of the reasons that the movement faces backlash from the Maya community. This movement was one of the leading organizations representing the Maya community during the peace accords.

The Pan-Maya movement has three groups of leaders: the elders, the second generation, and the third generation. The elders were born before the Civil War and received educations that consisted of their Indigenous ethnic consciousness. The Second generation was born at the beginning of the Guatemalan Civil War and were in charge during the peace accords. The third generation was born during the arguably most brutal years of the civil war (the 70s to 80s). Each group has different agendas for the Pan Maya movement, which has led to disunification within the movement. Kyrie Anne Kowalick argues that, for these reasons, the Pan-Maya movement has been unsuccessful in creating economic and political stability for the Maya peoples.

Another question that has risen from the Pan-Maya movement is whether the movement should focus on growing the Maya identity or the Maya popularity. Those that support growth of the Maya identity support the strengthening of the Maya culture. Those who support the growth of the Maya popularity focus on political questions that are more than expressions of the Maya ethnicity. Because of this disagreement in how the movement should be led as a whole, some Mayas choose to solely act within their own communities.

=== Environmental and land struggles ===
In the mid-1990s, the Maya communities' right to manage and protect communal forests was challenged by widespread illegal logging, which environmentalists and local Maya authorities viewed as a threat to the survival of the forest and, by extension, their own resources and way of life. In response, the Maya Association of Five Parcialidades joined forces with the municipality to form new associations aimed at protecting water committees and preserving communal lands.

There have also been struggles for Mayas to hold onto their ancestral land. In 1989, more than 500 Maya-Mam families in the Cajola community demanded for land called the Pampas del Horizonte, land that was stripped from the community to make way for the coffee economy back in 1884. The families stated that the land not only was based on legal titles, but based on Mam culture and historical heritages in which the land is a symbol of past struggles. Three major movements have since been attempted prior to the 1989 demand, but only a certain amount was redistributed and local power brokers maintained parts of the land. After an occupation of a farm in 1990 and initial state response with the presence of anti riot police, the government granted them Cajola community land on January 1, 1991, though only 89 families were given land with no water, housing or latrines.

Unsatisfied, Cajolnese families occupied the Coatunco farm again, but after the police burned temporary homes that they set up and "evicted" them on June 15, 1992, the families worked with activists to march to the capital so that they could protest at the public square. Heavy armed security forces and an anti-riot squad attacked the families and activists with clubs, guns and tear gas, with the women being attacked more. As a result of pressure from human rights organizations, the government presented a loan for the families to purchase the Santo Domingo farm, which the families accepted and moved in on December 23, 1992. Unfortunately, the new community, Nueva Cajola, subsequently suffered from Hurricane Mitch, growing debt amidst a globalizing economy and lack of substantial necessities that the government still has not provided.

Another case occurred in March 2011 when more than 800 Maya-Q'eqchi families were forcibly removed from their homes in the Polochic River region. The Widmann Lagardes family claimed that they owned the land despite the questionable techniques to acquire it, and after they received new funds from the Central American Economic Integration Bank to operate their sugar refineries, they began violent displacement to remove the communities. Homes were destroyed by bulldozers, hectares of crops were burned, families were harmed by tear gas and community member Antonio Beb Ac was killed. This ties to the larger conflict of displacement and dispossession of the Franja Transversal Norte region that occurs from increasing development over Indigenous land. When Maya communities lose their land, they lose basic housing and basic food security. Development projects and agribusiness also do not account for environmental consequences such as soil depletion and desertification, as well as pollution that affect local water supplies, wildlife and forest nutrition, which further harms communities in the region.

=== Cultural and structural challenges ===
Efforts by the Maya communities to form alliances and protect communal lands from privatization were indicative of the cultural and structural challenges they faced. These efforts were often met with opposition from influential local and external entities.
