= Barbara A. Babcock (folklorist) =

American folklore scholar (1943–2016)

- Born: August 7, 1943; Danville, Pennsylvania
- Died: February 6, 2016; Tucson, Arizona
- Occupation(s): Professor, folklorist
- Known for: comparative cultural studies of women in the American Southwest

Barbara Ann Babcock (August 7, 1943 – February 6, 2016) was an American folklore scholar, professor of Comparative Cultural and Literary Studies, Women's Studies, and American Indian Studies at the University of Arizona.

== Early life ==
Babcock was from Danville, Pennsylvania, the daughter of John Reed Babcock. Her father was a medical doctor affiliated with Geisinger Medical Center. She earned a bachelor's degree in comparative literature from Northwestern University in 1965. She completed doctoral studies at the University of Chicago in 1975, with a dissertation titled "Mirrors, Masks, and Metafiction: Studies in Narrative Reflexivity". In 1977–1978, she held the Weatherhead Fellowship at the School for Advanced Research in Santa Fe, New Mexico, to work on a post-doctoral project, "Pueblo Ritual Clowning."

== Career ==
Babcock taught at the University of Texas at Austin, before she joined the faculty at the University of Arizona in 1980. Her research involved Pueblo culture, women's work, and storytelling. Books written or edited by Babcock included The Pueblo Storyteller: Development of a Figurative Ceramic Tradition (1986, with Guy Monthan and Doris Born Monthan), The Reversible World: Essays on Symbolic Inversion, Daughters of the Desert: Women Anthropologists and the Native American Southwest, 1880–1980 (1988, with Nancy J. Parezo), an illustrated catalog published to accompany a museum exhibit and conference of the same title, Pueblo Mothers and Children: Essays by Elsie Clews Parsons, 1915–1924 (1991), and The Great Southwest of the Fred Harvey Company and the Santa Fe Railway (1996, with Marta Weigle). She edited special issues of journals including "Signs About Signs: The Semiotics of Self-Reference" (a special issue of Semiotica), "Inventing the Southwest: Region as Commodity" (1990, a special issue of the Journal of the Southwest), and "Bodylore" (1994, a special issue of the Journal of American Folklore).

Babcock served as president of the Society for Humanistic Anthropology and director of the Pembroke Center for Teaching and Research on Women at Brown University.

== Personal life ==
Babcock married Thaddeus John Koza in 1965. She died in 2016, at her home in Tucson, aged 72 years.
