= Joan Wallach Scott =

American historian (born 1941)

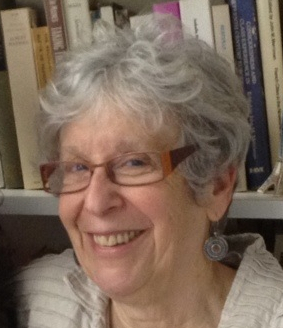
- Scott in 2013
- Born: Joan Wallach; December 18, 1941 (age 84); Brooklyn, New York, U.S.
- Spouse: Donald Scott
- Children: 2, including A. O. Scott
- Relatives: Eli Wallach (uncle)

Academic background
- Education: Brandeis University (1962); University of Wisconsin–Madison (PhD, 1969)

Academic work
- Discipline: History
- Institutions: Institute for Advanced Study

Joan Wallach Scott (born December 18, 1941) is an American historian of France with contributions in gender history. She is a professor emerita in the School of Social Science in the Institute for Advanced Study in Princeton, New Jersey. Scott is known for her work in feminist history and gender studies, engaging post-structural theory on these topics. Geographically, her work focuses primarily on France, and thematically she deals with how power works, the relation between language and experience, and the role and practice of historians. Her work grapples with theory's application to historical and current events, focusing on how terms are defined and how positions and identities are articulated.

Among her publications was the article "Gender: A Useful Category of Historical Analysis", published in 1986 in the American Historical Review. This article, "undoubtedly one of the most widely read and cited articles in the journal's history", was foundational in the formation of a field of gender history within the Anglo-American historical profession.

== Biography ==
She was born Joan Wallach in Brooklyn, New York, the daughter of Lottie (née Tannenbaum) and Sam Wallach, high school teachers.

== Academic career ==
Scott taught in history departments at the University of Illinois at Chicago, Northwestern University, the University of North Carolina at Chapel Hill, and Brown University, before becoming Harold F. Linder Professor at the School of Social Science of the Institute for Advanced Study in 1985. At Brown University she was founding director of the Pembroke Center for Teaching and Research on Women, and the Nancy Duke Lewis University Professor and professor of history. She has written that it was during her time at the Pembroke Center that she first started "to think about theory and gender". She serves on the editorial boards of Signs, Differences, History and Theory, Redescriptions and, since January 2006, the Journal of Modern History. In 2010, she helped to found History of the Present: A Journal of Critical History.

She has also played a major role in the American Association of University Professors (AAUP) as the chair of its Committee on Academic Freedom and Tenure.

She took emerita status at the Institute for Advanced Study in 2014.

== Research ==
Scott's work has challenged the foundations of conventional historical practice, including the nature of historical evidence and historical experience and the role of narrative in the writing of history. Drawing on a range of philosophical thought, as well as on a rethinking of her own training as a labor historian, she has contributed to a transformation of the field of intellectual history. Her current work focuses on the vexed relationship of the particularity of gender to the universalizing force of democratic politics.

Scott's work has been mostly concerned with modern French history and with the history of gender. In 1988 and, in an analogue way, in the book Sex and Secularism (2017), Scott argued that secularism, women's suffrage and sexual liberation didn't cause any equality of rights among men and women. On the contrary, they made sex "a public matter and a focus for state legislation" and dissolved the previous "gendered separation of public and private spheres, and unchangeable gender roles", in social systems in which male identity, freedom, authority and citizenship was required for social stability.

Reflecting her interest in European working class history, in 1980 Scott co-wrote with the British historian Eric Hobsbawm in an article in Past and Present entitled "Political Shoemakers".

In her 1986 article "Gender: A Useful Category of Historical Analysis", Scott argued that studying gender not only explains women's history, but all history as well.

Taking her own advice, Scott has sought to write such "gendered" histories in her books Gender and the Politics of History and Only Paradoxes to Offer: French Feminists and the Rights of Men. In her 1988 book Gender and the Politics of History, Scott expanded upon the themes she had introduced in "Gender: A Useful Category of Historical Analysis" to argue that gender was the "knowledge of sexual differences". Citing Foucault, she adopted his definition of "knowledge" as "the understanding produced by cultures and societies of human relationships".

In addition to her article "Gender: A Useful Category of Historical Analysis", Scott has published several books, which are widely reprinted and have been translated into several languages, including French, Japanese, Portuguese, and Korean. Her publications include The Glassworkers of Carmaux: French Craftsmen and Political Action in a Nineteenth Century City (Harvard University Press, 1974); Women, Work and Family (coauthored with Louise Tilly) (Holt, Rinehart and Winston, 1978); Gender and the Politics of History (Columbia University Press, 1988); Only Paradoxes to Offer: French Feminists and the Rights of Man (Harvard University Press, 1996); Parité: Sexual Difference and the Crisis of French Universalism (University of Chicago Press, 2005) and The Politics of the Veil (Princeton University Press, 2007). Scott has also edited numerous other books and published countless articles. She is also one of the founding editors of the journal History of the Present.

== Awards and honors ==
She has received various awards, accolades, and honorary degrees for her work, including the American Historical Association's Herbert Baxter Adams Prize, the Joan Kelly Memorial Prize, the Hans Sigrist Award for Outstanding Research in Gender Studies, and the Nancy Lyman Roelker Mentorship Award of the AHA for graduate mentorship in 1995. She holds honorary degrees from Brown University, Stony Brook University, The University of Bergen (Norway), Harvard University, Princeton University, Concordia University, and the University of Edinburgh.

In 2018, Joan Wallach Scott was named a Chevalier de la Légion d’Honneur of France, the country's highest decoration, for her contributions to the writing of history and to the intellectual, philosophical, and political debates of the French Republic.

== Students ==
Scott's influence within the academy has been extensive. She has played an influential role in establishing the careers of a number of prominent academics, winning the prestigious Nancy Lyman Roelker Mentorship Award in 1995. Among the students who completed their dissertations under Scott's supervision are Leora Auslander at the University of Chicago, Mary Louise Roberts at the University of Wisconsin–Madison, and Dagmar Herzog at the City University of New York. The Pembroke Center for Teaching and Research on Women at Brown University annually awards the Joan Wallach Scott Prize for an outstanding honors thesis in Gender and Sexuality Studies.

== Family ==
Previously married to Donald Scott, a professor of American history at CUNY, she is the mother of A. O. Scott, who is a book critic for The New York Times Book Review, and the artist Lizzie Scott. She is the niece of actor Eli Wallach (her father was Eli's brother).

== Bibliography ==
=== Books ===
- The Glassworkers of Carmaux: French Craftsmen and Political Action in a Nineteenth Century City. Cambridge, MA: Harvard University Press, 1974; French translation, Flammarion, 1982.
- Women, Work and Family (coauthored with Louise Tilly). New York: Holt, Rinehart and Winston, 1978; Routledge, 1987; Italian translation, 1981; French translation, 1987; Korean translation, 2008.
- Gender and the Politics of History. New York: Columbia University Press, 1988; Revised edition, 1999. Japanese translation, Heibonsha 1992; Spanish translation, Fondo de Cultura Economica, 2008.
- Only Paradoxes to Offer: French Feminists and the Rights of Man. Harvard University Press, 1996; French translation: Albin Michel, 1998; Portuguese translation: Editora Mulheres 2002; Korean translation, Sang Sanchi 2006.
- Parité: Sexual Equality and the Crisis of French Universalism. Chicago: University of Chicago Press, 2005. French translation: Albin Michel, 2005. Korean translation: Ingansarang, 2009.
- The Politics of the Veil. Princeton University Press, 2007. Bulgarian translation 2008; Arabic translation, Toubkal, 2009; Turkish translation, Tabur, 2012; French translation, Éd. Amsterdam, 2017.
- Théorie Critique de l'Histoire: Identités, expériences, politiques. Fayard, 2009.
- The Fantasy of Feminist History. Durham, Duke University Press, 2011.
- De l'Utilité du genre. Fayard, 2012.
- Sex and Secularism, Princeton University Press, 2017
- Knowledge, Power, and Academic Freedom, Columbia University Press, 2019
- On the Judgement of History, Columbia University Press, 2020

=== Edited books ===
- Scott, Joan W.; Conway, Jill; Bourque, Susan C. (1989). Learning about women: gender, politics and power. Ann Arbor: University of Michigan Press. ISBN 9780472063987.
- Scott, Joan W.; Butler, Judith (1992). Feminists theorize the political. New York: Routledge. ISBN 9780415902731.
- Scott, Joan W. (editor); Alper, Benedict S. (author) (1992). Love and politics in wartime: letters to my wife, 1943-45. Urbana: University of Illinois Press. ISBN 9780252018770.
- Scott, Joan W.; Gilbert, James; Gilman, Amy; Scott, Donald (1993). The mythmaking frame of mind: social imagination and American culture. Belmont, California: Wadsworth Publishing Co. ISBN 9780534190385.
- Scott, Joan W. (1996). Feminism and history. Oxford New York: Oxford University Press. ISBN 9780198751694.
- Scott, Joan W.; Kaplan, Cora; Keates, Debra (1997). Transitions, environments, translations: feminisms in international politics. New York: Routledge. ISBN 9780415915410.
- Scott, Joan W.; Tierney, Brian (2000). Western societies: a documentary history (2nd ed.). Boston: McGraw-Hill. ISBN 9780070648449.
- Scott, Joan W.; Keates, Debra (2001). Schools of thought: twenty-five years of interpretive social science. Princeton: Princeton University Press. ISBN 9780691088426.
- Scott, Joan W.; Keates, Debra (2004). Going public: feminism and the shifting boundaries of the private sphere. Urbana: University of Illinois Press. ISBN 9780252072093.
- Scott, Joan W. (2008). Women's studies on the edge. Durham: Duke University Press. ISBN 9780822342748.
- Scott, Joan W.; Perreau, Bruno (2017). Les défis de la République: genre, territoires, citoyenneté. Paris: Presses de Sciences Po. ISBN 9782724619959.

=== Chapters in books ===
- Scott, Joan W. (2005), "French universalism in the nineties", in Friedman, Marilyn (ed.), Women and citizenship, Studies in Feminist Philosophy, Oxford New York: Oxford University Press, pp. 35–51, ISBN 9780195175356.
- Scott, Joan W. with Wendy Brown (2014), "Power", Critical Terms for the Study of Gender, Chicago: The University of Chicago Press.

=== Articles ===
- "The Glassworkers of Carmaux", in S. Thernstrom and R. Sennett (eds), Nineteenth Century Cities: Essays in the New Urban History (Yale University Press, 1969), pp. 3–48.
- "Les Verriers de Carmaux, 1865-1900," Le Mouvement Social 76 (1971), pp. 67–93.
- "Women's Work and the Family in 19th Century Europe" (coauthored with Louise Tilly), in C. Rosenberg (ed.), The Family in History (University of Pennsylvania Press, 1975), pp. 145–178.
- "Labor History in the United States since the 1960s," Le Mouvement Social, No. 100 (July 1977), pp. 121–131.
- Recent U.S. Scholarship on the History of Women (coauthored with B. Sicherman, W. Monter, K. Sklar). American Historical Association, 1980.
- "Social History and the History of Socialism: French Socialist Municipalities in the 1890s," Le Mouvement Social 111 (Spring 1980), pp. 145–153.
- "Political Shoemakers" (coauthored with Eric Hobsbawm), Past and Present 89 (November 1980), pp. 86–114.
- "Dix Ans de l'histoire des femmes aux états-unis," Le Débat 19 (1981), pp. 127–132 (translated into Spanish for publication in Débat, 1984).
- "Politics and the Profession: Women Historians in the 1980s," Women's Studies Quarterly 9:3 (Fall 1981).
- "Mayors versus Police Chiefs: Socialist Municipalities Confront the French State," in John Merriman, ed., French Cities in the Nineteenth Century (London: Hutchinson, 1982), pp. 230–45.
- "Popular Theater and Socialism in Late Nineteenth Century France," in Seymour Drescher, David Sabean, and Allen Sharlin (eds)., Political Symbolism in Modern Europe: Essays in Honor of George L. Mosse (New Brunswick: Transaction Books 1982), pp. 197–215.
- "The Mechanization of Women's Work," Scientific American 247:3 (September 1982), pp. 166–87.
- "Women's History: The Modern Period," Past and Present 101 (November 1983), pp. 141–57.
- "Men and Women in the Parisian Garment Trades: Discussions of Family and Work in the 1830s and 40's," R. Floud, G. Crossick and P. Thane (eds), The Power of the Past: Essays in Honor of Eric Hobsbawm (Cambridge University Press, 1984), pp. 67–94.
- "Statistical Representations of Work: The Chamber of Commerce's Statistique de l'Industrie à Paris, 1847-48," in Stephen Kaplan, ed., Work in France: Representations, Meaning, Organization, and Practice (Cornell University Press, 1986), pp. 335–363.
- "Women's History as Women's Education: Representations of Sexuality and Women's Colleges in America," (Smith College, Northampton, Mass., 1986).
- "Gender: A Useful Category of Historical Analysis," American Historical Review 91, no. 5 (December 1986), pp. 1053–75 (French, Italian, Spanish, Portuguese, Bulgarian, Estonian, and Polish translations).
- "On Language, Gender, and Working Class History," International Labor and Working Class History 31 (Spring 1987), pp. 1–13 and "Reply to Critics of This Piece," 32 (Fall 1987), pp. 39–45 (Spanish and Swedish translations).
- "'L'Ouvrière! Mot Impie, Sordide...' Women Workers in the Discourse of French Political Economy (1840-1860)," in Patrick Joyce, ed., The Historical Meanings of Work. (Cambridge University Press, 1987), pp. 119–42. French translation in Actes de la Recherche en Sciences Sociales 83 (June 1990), pp. 2–15.
- "Rewriting History," in Margaret Higonnet et al. (eds), Behind the Lines: Gender and the Two World Wars (Yale University Press, 1987), pp. 19–30.
- "History and Difference," Daedalus (Fall 1987), pp. 93–118. "Deconstructing Equality-versus-Difference: Or, the Uses of Poststructuralist Theory for Feminism," Feminist Studies (Spring 1988), pp. 33–50.
- "The Problem of Invisibility," in S. Jay Kleinberg, ed., Retrieving Women's History: Changing Perceptions of the Role of Women in Politics and Society (London and Paris: Berg/Unesco 1988), pp. 5–29.
- "History in Crisis? The Others' Side of the Story," American Historical Review 94 (June 1989), pp. 680–692.
- "Interview with Joan Scott," Radical History Review 45 (1989), pp. 41–59.
- "French Feminists and the Rights of 'Man': Olympe de Gouges' Declarations," History Workshop No. 28 (Autumn 1989), pp. 1–21.
- "A Woman Who Has Only Paradoxes to Offer: Olympe de Gouges Claims Rights for Women," in Sara E. Melzer and Leslie W. Rabine (eds), Rebel Daughters: Women and the French Revolution (New York: Oxford University Press, 1992), pp. 102–20.
- "Women's History," in Peter Burke (ed.), New Perspectives on Historical Writing, (London: Polity Press, 1991), pp. 42–66.
- "Rethinking the History of Women's Work," chapter for Vol. IV of Storia della Donne, edited by Michelle Perrot and Georges Duby (Rome, Laterza, 1990; Paris, Plon, 1991; Cambridge, MA, Harvard University Press, 1993), pp. 773–797.
- "The Evidence of Experience," Critical Inquiry (Summer 1991); reprinted in various collections of essays, and in Questions of Evidence: Proof, Practice, and Persuasion across the Disciplines, edited by James Chandler, Arnold I. Davidson, and Harry Harootunian (Chicago: University of Chicago Press, 1994), pp. 363–387. Spanish translation 2001.
- "Liberal Historians: A Unitary Vision," Chronicle of Higher Education, September 11, 1991, pp. B1-2.
- "The Campaign Against Political Correctness: What's Really at Stake?" Change (November/December 1991), pp. 30–43; reprinted in Radical History Review (1992), pp. 59–79; also in various collections of essays.
- "Multiculturalism and the Politics of Identity," October 61 (Summer 1992), pp. 12–19; reprinted in John Rajchman (ed.), The Identity in Question (New York: Routledge, 1995), pp. 3–12.
- "The New University: Beyond Political Correctness," Boston Review (March/April 1992), pp. 29–31.
- "The Rhetoric of Crisis in Higher Education," in Higher Education Under Fire: Politics, Economics, and the Crisis of the Humanities, edited by Michael Bérubé and Cary Nelson (Routledge, 1995), pp. 293–334.
- "The woman worker", in Geneviève Fraisse, Georges Duby and Michelle Perrot, eds., A History of Women in the West, Volume IV (Belknap, 1995), p. 399.
- "Academic Freedom as an Ethical Practice," in Louis Menand (ed.), The Future of Academic Freedom (University of Chicago Press, 1996), pp. 163–180.
- "Forum: Raymond Martin, Joan W. Scott, and Cushing Strout on 'Telling the Truth About History,'" History and Theory, vol. 34 (1995), pp. 329–334.
- "Vive la différence!" Le Débat, November–December 1995, pp. 134–139. "After History?", Common Knowledge, vol. 5, no. 3 (Winter 1996), pp. 9–26.
- "'La Querelle des Femmes' in Late Twentieth Century France," New Left Review November/December 1997, pp. 3–19 (French translation: Parité-infos, #19, Sept. 1997).
- "Border Patrol," contribution to "Forum" A Crisis in History? On Gérard Noiriel's Sur la Crise de l'Histoire," French Historical Studies 21:3 (Summer 1998), pp. 383-397.
- "Some Reflections on Gender and Politics," in Myra Marx Ferree, Judith Lorber, and Beth B. Hess (eds), Revisioning Gender (Sage Publications, 1999), pp. 70–96.
- "Entretien avec Joan Scott," Mouvements: Sociétés, politique, culture no. 2 (Jan- Fev 1999), pp. 101–112.
- "La Traduction Infidèle," Vacarme, No. 19 (1999).
- "Feminist Family Politics," French Politics, Culture and Society 17:3-4 (Summer/Fall 1999), pp. 20–30.
- "The 'Class' We Have Lost," International Labor & Working-Class History, no. 57 (Spring 2000), pp. 69–75.
- "Fantasy Echo: History and the Construction of Identity," Critical Inquiry 27 (Winter 2001), pp. 284–304 (German translation: "Phantasie und Erfahrung," Feministische Studien Vol. 2, 2001).
- "Les 'guerres académiques' aux Etats-Unis," in L'Université en questions: marché des saviors, nouvelle agora, tour d'ivoire?, edited by Julie Allard, Guy Haarscher, and Maria Puig de la Bellacasa (Brussels: Editions Labor, 2001).
- "Faculty Governance," Academe July–August 2002, pp. 41–48.
- "French Universalism in the 90's," differences 15.2 (2004), pp. 32–53.
- "Feminism's History," Journal of Women's History 16.1 (2005), pp. 10–29.
- "Symptomatic Politics: The Banning of Islamic Head Scarves in French Public Schools," French Politics, Culture and Society 23:3 (Fall 2005), pp. 106–27.
- "Against Eclecticism," differences 16.3 (Fall 2005), pp. 114–37. "History-writing as Critique", Keith Jenkins et al. (eds), Manifestos for History (London: Routledge, 2007), 19–38.
- "Back to the Future," History and Theory 47:2 (2008), pp. 279–84.
- "Unanswered Questions," contribution to AHR Forum, "Revisiting 'Gender: A Useful Category of Historical Analysis'," American Historical Review 113:5 (Dec. 2008), pp. 1422–30.
- "Finding Critical History," in James Banner and John Gillis (eds), Becoming Historians (Chicago: University of Chicago Press, 2009), pp. 26–53.
- "Knowledge, Power, and Academic Freedom," Social Research (Summer 2009).
- "Gender: Still a Useful Category of Analysis?" Diogenes, vol. 57, no. 225 (2010).
- "Storytelling," History and Theory (Spring 2011).
