= Gender studies =

Interdisciplinary field of study

Gender studies is an interdisciplinary academic field devoted to analysing gender identity and gendered representation. Gender studies originated in the field of women's studies, concerning women, feminism, gender, and politics. Queer studies, transgender studies, and men's studies are sub-fields of gender studies. Its rise to prominence, especially in Western universities after 1990, coincided with the rise of deconstruction.

Disciplines that frequently contribute to gender studies include the fields of literature, linguistics, human geography, history, political science, archaeology, economics, sociology, psychology, anthropology, cinema, musicology, media studies, human development, law, public health, disability studies, and medicine. Gender studies also analyzes how race, ethnicity, location, social class, nationality, and disability intersect with the categories of gender, gender identity, and sexuality. In gender studies, the term "gender" is often used to refer to the social and cultural constructions of masculinity and femininity, rather than biological aspects of the male or female sex; however, this view is not held by all gender scholars.

Gender is pertinent to many disciplines, such as literary theory, drama studies, film theory, performance theory, contemporary art history, anthropology, sociology, sociolinguistics, disability studies, biology and psychology. These disciplines sometimes differ in their approaches to how and why gender is studied. In politics, gender can be viewed as a foundational discourse that political actors employ in order to position themselves on a variety of issues. Gender studies is also a discipline in itself, incorporating methods and approaches from a wide range of disciplines.

Many fields came to regard "gender" as a practice, sometimes referred to as something that is performative. Feminist theory of psychoanalysis, articulated mainly by Julia Kristeva and Bracha L. Ettinger, and informed both by Sigmund Freud, Jacques Lacan and the object relations theory, is very influential in gender studies.

== Influences ==
=== Psychoanalytic theory ===
A number of theorists have influenced the field of gender studies significantly, specifically in terms of psychoanalytic theory. Among these are Sigmund Freud, Jacques Lacan, Julia Kristeva, and Bracha L. Ettinger. Gender studied under the lens of each of these theorists looks somewhat different. In a Freudian system, women are "mutilated and must learn to accept their lack of a penis" (in Freud's terms a "deformity"). Lacan, however, organizes femininity and masculinity according to different unconscious structures. Both male and female subjects participate in the "phallic" organization, and the feminine side of sexuation is "supplementary" and not opposite or complementary. Lacan uses the concept of sexuation (sexual situation), which posits the development of gender-roles and role-play in childhood, to counter the idea that gender identity is innate or biologically determined. According to Lacan, the sexuation of an individual has as much, if not more, to do with their development of a gender identity as being genetically sexed male or female.

Kristeva contends that patriarchal cultures, like individuals, have to exclude the maternal and the feminine so that they can come into being. Bracha L. Ettinger transformed subjectivity in contemporary psychoanalysis since the early 1990s with the Matrixial feminine-maternal and prematernal Eros of borderlinking (bordureliance), borderspacing (bordurespacement) and co-emergence. The matrixial feminine difference defines a particular gaze and it is a source for trans-subjectivity and transjectivity in both males and females. Ettinger rethinks the human subject as informed by the archaic connectivity to the maternal and proposes the idea of a Demeter-Persephone Complexity.

==== Feminist psychoanalytic theory ====
Feminist theorists such as Juliet Mitchell, Nancy Chodorow, Jessica Benjamin, Jane Gallop, Bracha L. Ettinger, Shoshana Felman, Griselda Pollock, Luce Irigaray and Jane Flax have developed a Feminist psychoanalysis and argued that psychoanalytic theory is vital to the feminist project and must, like other theoretical traditions, be criticized by women as well as transformed to free it from vestiges of sexism (i.e. being censored). Shulamith Firestone, in The Dialectic of Sex, calls Freudianism the misguided feminism and discusses how Freudianism is almost completely accurate, with the exception of one crucial detail: everywhere that Freud writes "penis", the word should be replaced with "power".

Critics such as Elizabeth Grosz accuse Jacques Lacan of maintaining a sexist tradition in psychoanalysis. Others, such as Judith Butler, Bracha L. Ettinger and Jane Gallop have used Lacanian work, though in a critical way, to develop gender studies. According to J. B. Marchand, "The gender studies and queer theory are rather reluctant, hostile to see the psychoanalytic approach." For Jean-Claude Guillebaud, gender studies (and activists of sexual minorities) "besieged" and consider psychoanalysis and psychoanalysts as "the new priests, the last defenders of the genital normality, morality, moralism or even obscurantism".

Judith Butler's worries about the psychoanalytic outlook under which sexual difference is "undeniable" and pathologizing any effort to suggest that it is not so paramount and unambiguous ...". According to Daniel Beaune and Caterina Rea, the gender-studies "often criticized psychoanalysis to perpetuate a family and social model of patriarchal, based on a rigid and timeless version of the parental order".

=== Literary theory ===
Psychoanalytically oriented French feminism focused on visual and literary theory all along. Virginia Woolf's legacy as well as "Adrienne Rich's call for women's revisions of literary texts, and history as well, has galvanized a generation of feminist authors to reply with texts of their own". Griselda Pollock and other feminists have articulated Myth and poetry and literature, from the point of view of gender.

=== Postcolonialism and Decolonialism ===
Decolonial studies is an interdisciplinary study that analyzes the lasting impact of colonialism and the structures that create and maintain systems of knowledge, power, and hierarchy. Race and Gender are considered to be two of the spheres of 'coloniality' by Aníbal Quijano. Marìa Lugones called the method of overcoming the coloniality of gender to be 'decolonial feminism', which addressed the central role of gender and race played in sustaining colonial hierarchies. Building on this foundation, McShane argues that the very foundation of gender studies, gender performativity and intersectionality function are decolonial methodologies that challenge the eurocentric and imperialism framework within the western academic institutions.

Chandra Talpadea Mohanty, a transnational feminist scholar, published Under Western Eyes - Feminist Scholarship and Colonial Discourses in 1984, in which she critiqued the homogenous and victimized image of "Third World Woman", and the experiences of whom are incredibly diverse given historical, cultural and individual backgrounds. This hinged the power relationship between different lived experiences and importance of constructing diverse narratives.

=== Post-modern influence ===
The emergence of post-modernism theories affected gender studies, causing a movement in identity theories away from the concept of fixed or essentialist gender identity, to post-modern fluid or multiple identities. The impact of post-structuralism, and its literary theory aspect post-modernism, on gender studies was most prominent in its challenge of grand narratives. Post-structuralism paved the way for the emergence of queer theory in gender studies, which necessitated the field expanding its purview to sexuality.

In addition to the expansion to include sexuality studies, under the influence of post-modernism gender studies has also turned its lens toward masculinity studies, due to the work of sociologists and theorists such as R. W. Connell, Michael Kimmel, and E. Anthony Rotundo. These changes and expansions have led to some contentions within the field, such as the one between second wave feminists and queer theorists. The line drawn between these two camps lies in the problem as feminists see it of queer theorists arguing that everything is fragmented and there are not only no grand narratives but also no trends or categories. Feminists argue that this erases the categories of gender altogether but does nothing to antagonize the power dynamics reified by gender. In other words, the fact that gender is socially constructed does not undo the fact that there are strata of oppression between genders.

== Development ==
=== History ===
The history of gender studies looks at the different perspectives of gender. This discipline examines the ways in which historical, cultural, and social events shape the role of gender in different societies. The field of gender studies, while focusing on the differences between men and women, also looks at sexual differences and less binary definitions of gender categorization.

=== Academic Institutions ===
==== Early ====
Institut für Sexualwissenschaft (Institute for Sexual Science) was a German research-based institute that was in operation from 1919 to 1933. The institute was lost to two waves of attacks that led to the loss of approximately 12,000-20,000 journals, books and articles, with others suggesting larger numbers, not including other media materials.

==== Post-structural - Modern ====
After the universal suffrage revolution of the twentieth century, the women's liberation movement of the 1960s and 1970s promoted a revision from the feminists to "actively interrogate" the usual and accepted versions of history as it was known at the time. It was the goal of many feminist scholars to question original assumptions regarding women's and men's attributes, to actually measure them, and to report observed differences between women and men. Initially, these programs were essentially feminist, designed to recognize contributions made by women as well as by men. Soon, men began to look at masculinity the same way that women were looking at femininity, and developed an area of study called "men's studies". San Diego State College (now San Diego State University) founded the first Women's Studies program in 1970. It was not until the late 1980s and 1990s that scholars recognized a need for study in the field of sexuality. This was due to the increasing interest in lesbian and gay rights, and scholars found that most individuals will associate sexuality and gender together, rather than as separate entities.

==== Contemporary ====
Although doctoral programs for women's studies have existed since 1990, the first doctoral program for a potential PhD in gender studies in the United States was approved in November 2005. In 2015, Kabul University became the first university in Afghanistan to offer a master's degree course in gender and women's studies. After the Taliban took over the Afghan capital, the university fell under their control and banned women from attending.

=== Theories ===
==== Gender Performativity ====
Philosopher and gender studies Judith Butler's work Gender Trouble discussed gender performativity. In Butler's terms the performance of gender, sex, and sexuality is about power in society. They locate the construction of the "gendered, sexed, desiring subject" in "regulative discourses". A part of Butler's argument concerns the role of sex in the construction of "natural" or coherent gender and sexuality. In their account, gender and heterosexuality are constructed as natural because the opposition of the male and female sexes is perceived as natural in the social imaginary. "Men's and Women's Beliefs About Gender and Sexuality" is an article written by authors Emily Kane and Mimi Schippers, which explicitly focuses on the social construct of social opposition between men and women. Parallel to Butler's argument, this article also argues that gender is constructed as "natural" within our society when in reality it contains arbitrary aspects. By pointing out distinct differences between gender aspects of both men and women, this article reveals the source of opposition that Butler mentions, arguing that "men and women share a variety of interests based on personal circumstances and on social locations other than gender, but men's and women's gender interests do tend to differ."

==== Intersectionality ====
Intersectionality, first introduced by Kimberlé Crenshaw in 1989, describes how social attributes such as race, gender, class and sexuality interact together to produce a compounding effect on individual's experiences of equality. Crenshaw argues that Black women's experiences could not be fully elaborated by mainstream feminist scholars at the time, which failed to account for the experiences of women of color under discrimination and oppression. Later, Patricia Collins states that race, class and gender are not additive but mutually constitutive systems of power that shape the knowledge acquisition and lived experience of black women. Intersectionality has been a foundational framework within gender studies.

=== Subfields ===
==== Women's studies ====
Women's studies is an interdisciplinary academic field devoted to topics concerning women, feminism, gender, and politics. It often includes feminist theory, women's history (e.g. a history of women's suffrage) and social history, women's fiction, women's health, feminist psychoanalysis and the feminist and gender studies-influenced practice of most of the humanities and social sciences.

==== Queer Studies ====
Queer studies is an interdisciplinary field examining how sexuality, gender identity and the ways those categories are constructed, regulated and experienced in different culture, history and time. Judith Butler introduced the idea of performativity in 1990, which is a foundational concept in queer studies, arguing that gender, even sex, was produced by repetition of performance of norms.

Eve Kosofsky Sedgwick first defined "queer" as "an open mesh of possibilities, gaps, overlaps, dissonances and resonances, lapses and excesses of meaning" in 1993. She pointed out that the binary of homo and heterosexual are essential in the knowledge production in 20 century that influences how culture was structured and fractured.

==== Transgender Studies ====
Transgender studies, or trans/trans* studies, is an interdisciplinary field focuses on gender identity, gender expression and gender embodiment of transgender and other gender-nonconforming population in identity politicization, power formation and intersectionality. In Transgender History (2008) by Susan Stryker, she provided a comprehensive overview of trans history and activism in the United States of America from 19th century till early 21st century. In Female Masculinity, Jack Halberstam argued that masculinity was not exclusive for male bodies, in which he examined the embodiment of masculinity for butch, transgender and gender-nonconforming population. Later Halberstam proposed the concept of queer temporality that queer and trans bodies experience alternative way of inhabiting time outside of traditional norms, and such rejection, could be viewed as inspirations for queer futurity.

In Normal Life (2015), Dean Spade raised the essential question on how much legal framework could uphold trans rights. He pointed out that trans issues were rapidly politicized and legal recognition failed to benefit trans populations.

==== Men's studies ====
Men's studies is an interdisciplinary academic field devoted to topics concerning men, gender, and politics. It often includes feminist theory, men's history and social history, men's fiction, men's health, feminist psychoanalysis and the feminist and gender studies-influenced practice of most of the humanities and social sciences. Timothy Laurie and Anna Hickey-Moody suggest that there 'have always been dangers present in the institutionalisation of "masculinity studies" as a semi-gated community', and note that 'a certain triumphalism vis-à-vis feminist philosophy haunts much masculinities research'.

Within studies on men, it is important to distinguish the specific approach often defined as Critical Studies on Men. This approach was largely developed in the anglophone countries from the early 1980s – especially in the United Kingdom – centred then around the work of Jeff Hearn, David Morgan and colleagues. The influence of the approach has spread globally since then. It is inspired primarily by a range of feminist perspectives (including socialist and radical) and places emphasis on the need for research and practice to explicitly challenge men's and boys' sexism. Although it explores a very broad range of men's practices, it tends to focus especially on issues related to sexuality and/or men's violences. Although originally largely rooted in sociology, it has since engaged with a broad range of other disciplines including social policy, social work, cultural studies, gender studies, education and law. In more recent years, Critical Studies on Men research has made particular use of comparative and/or transnational perspectives. Like Men's Studies and Masculinity Studies more generally, Critical Studies on Men has been critiqued for its failure to adequately focus on the issue of men's relations with children as a key site for the development of men's masculinity formations – men's relations with women and men's relations with other men being the two sites which are heavily researched by comparison.

=== Gender in Asia and Polynesia ===
Certain issues associated with gender in Eastern Asia and the Pacific Region are more complex and depend on location and context. For example, in China, Vietnam, Thailand, Philippines and Indonesia, a heavy importance of what defines a woman comes from the workforce. In these countries, "gender related challenges tend to be related to economic empowerment, employment, and workplace issues, for example related to informal sector workers, feminization of migration flows, work place conditions, and long term social security". However, in countries who are less economically stable, such as Papua New Guinea, Timor-Leste, Laos, Cambodia, and some provinces in more remote locations, "women tend to bear the cost of social and domestic conflicts and natural disasters".

Places such as India and Polynesia have widely identified third-gender categories. For example, the hijra/kinnar/kinner people of India are often regarded as being a third-gender. Hijra is often considered an offensive term, so the terms kinnar & kinner are often used for these individuals. In places such as India and Pakistan, these individuals face higher rates of HIV infection, depression, and homelessness. Polynesian languages are also consistent with the idea of a third-gender or non-binary gender. The Samoan term fa'afafine, meaning "in the manner of a woman", is used to refer to a third-gender/non-binary role in society. These sexualities are expressed across a spectrum, although some literature has suggested that fa'afafine individuals do not form sexual relations with one another.

One issue that remains consistent throughout all provinces in different stages of development is women having a weak voice when it comes to decision-making. One of the reasons for this is the "growing trend to decentralization [which] has moved decision-making down to levels at which women's voice is often weakest and where even the women's civil society movement, which has been a powerful advocate at national level, struggles to organize and be heard".

East Asia Pacific's approach to help mainstream these issues of gender relies on a three-pillar method. Pillar one is partnering with middle-income countries and emerging middle-income countries to sustain and share gains in growth and prosperity. Pillar two supports the developmental underpinnings for peace, renewed growth and poverty reduction in the poorest and most fragile areas. The final pillar provides a stage for knowledge management, exchange and dissemination on gender responsive development within the region to begin. These programs have already been established, and successful in, Vietnam, Thailand, China, as well as the Philippines, and efforts are starting to be made in Laos, Papua New Guinea, and Timor-Leste as well. These pillars speak to the importance of showcasing gender studies.

== Criticism ==
Historian and theorist Bryan Palmer argues that gender studies' current reliance on post-structuralism – with its reification of discourse and avoidance of the structures of oppression and struggles of resistance – obscures the origins, meanings, and consequences of historical events and processes, and he seeks to counter current trends in gender studies with an argument for the necessity to analyze lived experiences and the structures of subordination and power. Psychologist Debra W. Soh postulates that gender studies is composed of dubious scholarship, that it is an unscientific ideology, and that it causes needless disruption in the lives of children.

Feminist philosopher Rosi Braidotti has criticized gender studies as "the take-over of the feminist agenda by studies on masculinity, which results in transferring funding from feminist faculty positions to other kinds of positions. There have been cases... of positions advertised as 'gender studies' being given away to the 'bright boys'. Some of the competitive take-over has to do with gay studies. Of special significance in this discussion is the role of the mainstream publisher Routledge who, in our opinion, is responsible for promoting gender as a way of deradicalizing the feminist agenda, re-marketing masculinity and gay male identity instead." Calvin Thomas countered that, "as Joseph Allen Boone points out, 'many of the men in the academy who are feminism's most supportive 'allies' are gay,'" and that it is "disingenuous" to ignore the ways in which mainstream publishers such as Routledge have promoted feminist theorists.

Gender studies, and more particularly queer studies within gender studies, has been criticized by Catholic Church bishops and cardinals as an attack on human biology. Pope Francis has said that teaching about gender identity in schools is "ideological colonization" that threatens traditional families and fertile heterosexuality. France was one of the first countries where this claim became widespread when Catholic movements marched in the streets of Paris against the bill on gay marriage and adoption. Scholar of law and gender Bruno Perreau argues that this fear has deep historical roots, and that the rejection of gender studies and queer theory expresses anxieties about national identity and minority politics. Jayson Harsin argues that the French anti–'gender theory' movement demonstrates qualities of global right-wing populist post-truth politics.

Teaching certain aspects of gender studies was banned in public schools in New South Wales after an independent review into how the state teaches sex and health education and the controversial material included in the teaching materials.

=== Government attitudes ===
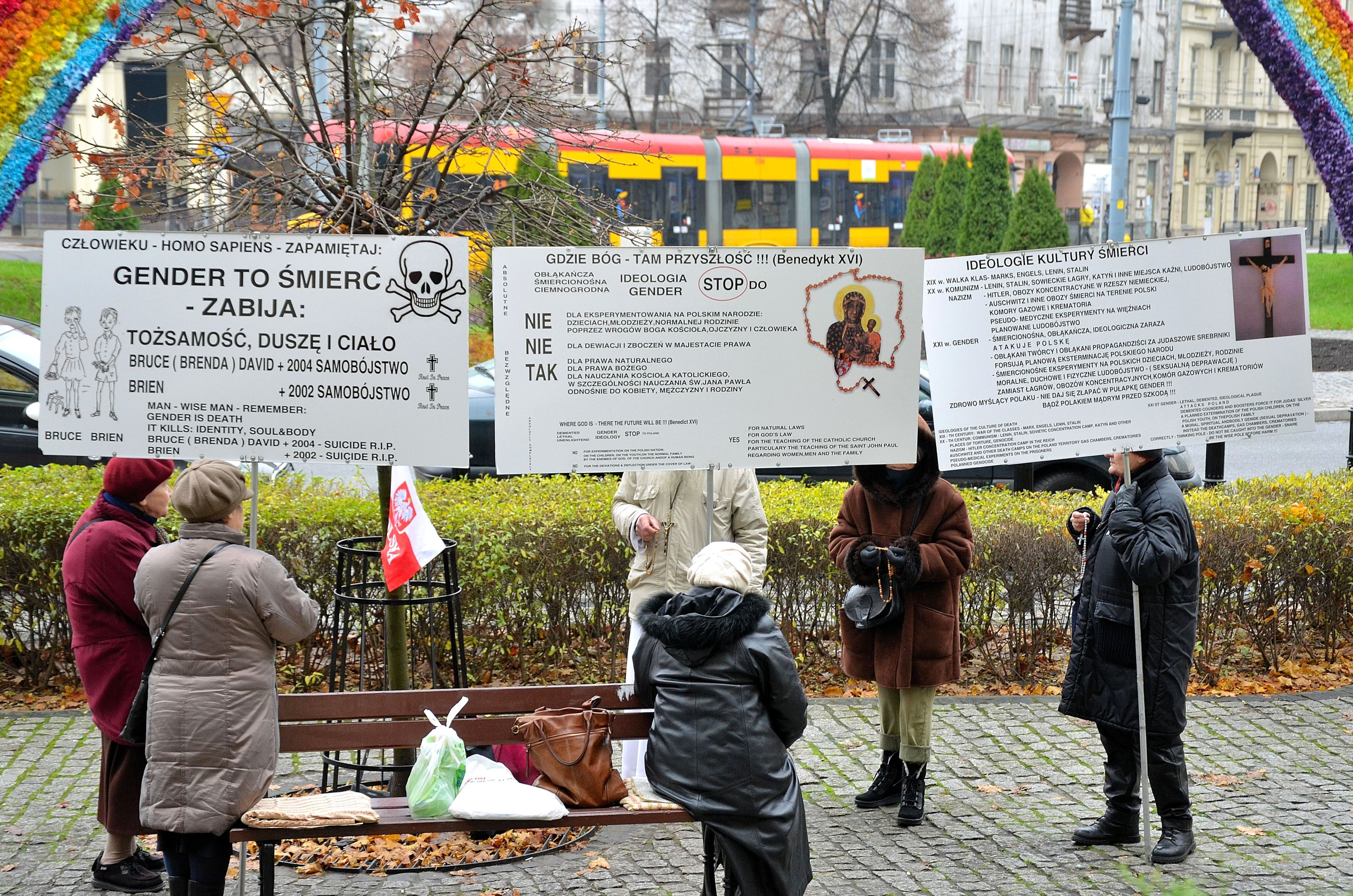
Picketing against "gender ideology" in Warsaw, 2014

In Central and Eastern Europe, anti-gender movements are on the rise, especially in Hungary, Poland, and Russia.

==== Russia ====
In Russia, gender studies is currently tolerated; however, state-supported practices follow the traditional gender perspectives of those in power. The law related to prosecuting and sentencing domestic violence, for instance, was greatly limited in 2017. Since 2010, the Russian government has also been leading a campaign at the UNHRC to recognise Russian "traditional values" as a legitimate consideration in human rights protection and promotion.

==== Hungary ====
Gender studies programs were banned in Hungary in October 2018. In a statement released by Hungarian Prime Minister Viktor Orbán's office, a spokesperson stated that "The government's standpoint is that people are born either male or female, and we do not consider it acceptable for us to talk about socially constructed genders rather than biological sexes." The ban has attracted criticism from several European universities which offer the program, among them the Budapest-based Central European University, whose charter was revoked by the government, and is widely seen as part of the Hungarian ruling party's move away from democratic principles.

==== China ====
The Central People's Government supports studies of gender and social development of gender in history and practices that lead to gender equality. Citing Mao Zedong's philosophy, "Women hold up half the sky", this may be seen as continuation of equality of men and women introduced as part of Cultural Revolution.

==== Romania ====
The Romanian Senate approved by broad majority in June 2020 an update of National Education Law that would ban theories and opinions on gender identity according to which gender is a separate concept from biological sex. In December 2020, the Constitutional Court of Romania overturned the ban; earlier, President Klaus Iohannis had challenged the bill.

==== United States ====
The United States currently allows academic institutions to offer courses in gender and sexuality studies, women's studies, feminist studies, queer studies and LGBT studies. Institutions that offer such courses include Harvard, Stanford, USC, UCLA, Lehigh University, and Lafayette College.

Donald Trump issued Executive Order 14168 during his second presidency, which called for, among other things, "end[ing] the Federal funding of gender ideology."

== See also ==
- Androcentrism
- Gynocentrism
- Gender and politics
- Gender history
- Gender role
- Genderqueer
- List of women's and gender studies academics
- Postgenderism
- Sex and gender distinction
- Social construction of gender
- Third gender
- Transgender
- Women in philosophy

== Bibliography ==
- Armstrong, Carol; de Zegher, Catherine (27 October 2006). Women Artists at the Millennium (PDF). MIT Press. ISBN 978-0-262-01226-3. OCLC 62766150.
- Berger, Anne Emmanuelle (September 2016). "Gender springtime in Paris: a twenty-first century tale of seasons". differences: A Journal of Feminist Cultural Studies. 27 (2): 1–26. doi:10.1215/10407391-3621685.
- Butler, Judith (16 December 1993). Bodies That Matter: On the Discursive Limits of 'Sex'. New York: Routledge. ISBN 978-0-415-90366-0. OCLC 27897792.
- Butler, Judith (Summer 1994). "Feminism by any other name (Judith Butler interviews Rosi Braidotti)" (PDF). differences: A Journal of Feminist Cultural Studies. 6 (2–3): 272–361.
- Butler, Judith (1999). Gender Trouble: Feminism and the Subversion of Identity (2nd ed.). New York: Routledge. ISBN 978-0-415-92499-3. OCLC 41326734.
- Cante, Richard C. (March 2008). Gay Men and the Forms of Contemporary US Culture. London: Ashgate Publishing. ISBN 978-0-7546-7230-2. OCLC 173218594.
- Cárdenas, Micha and Barbara Fornssler, 2010. Trans Desire/Affective Cyborgs. New York: Atropos press. ISBN 0-9825309-9-4
- Clark, April K. (March 2017). "Updating the gender gap(s): a multilevel approach to what underpins changing cultural attitudes". Politics & Gender. 13 (1): 26–56. doi:10.1017/S1743923X16000520. S2CID 151372385.
- Cranny-Francis, Anne; Kirkby, Joan; Stavropoulos, Pam; Waring, Wendy (28 November 2002). Gender studies: terms and debates. Basingstoke: Palgrave Macmillan. ISBN 978-0-333-77612-4. OCLC 50645644.
- De Beauvoir, Simone (December 1989). The Second Sex. Translated by Borde, Constance; Malovany-Chevallier, Sheila (Reissue ed.). New York: Vintage. ISBN 978-0-333-77612-4. OCLC 50645644.
- Ettinger, Bracha L. (30 September 2001). "The Red Cow Effect". In Howe, Mica; Aguiar, Sarah A. (eds.). He Said, She Says: An RSVP to the Male Text. Fairleigh Dickinson University Press. pp. 57–88. ISBN 978-0-8386-3915-3. OCLC 46472137.
- Ettinger, Bracha L. (January 2006). Massumi, Brian (ed.). The Matrixial Borderspace (Theory Out of Bounds). Foreword by Judith Butler, Introduction by Griselda Pollock. University of Minnesota Press. ISBN 978-0-8166-3587-0. OCLC 62177997.
- Ettinger, Bracha L., 2006. "From Proto-ethical Compassion to Responsibility: Besidedness, and the three Primal Mother-Phantasies of Not-enoughness, Devouring and Abandonment". Athena: Philosophical Studies. Vol. 2. ISSN 1822-5047.
- Farrell, Warren (31 January 2001) [First published in 1993 as The Myth of Male Power: Why Men are the Disposable Sex]. The Myth of Male Power (Reprint ed.). New York: Berkley Publishing Corporation. ISBN 978-0425181447.
- Farrell, Warren; Svoboda, Steven; Sterba, James P. (10 October 2007). Does Feminism Discriminate Against Men? A Debate (Point/Counterpoint). Oxford University Press. ASIN B019L52IHW.
- Foucault, Michel (1 November 1988). The Care of the Self: The History of Sexuality. Vol. 3 (Reprint ed.). Vintage Books. ISBN 978-0-394-74155-0. OCLC 20521501.
- Foucault, Michel (31 December 1990). History of Sexuality: An Introduction. Vintage Books. ISBN 978-0-679-72469-8. OCLC 5102034.
- Foucault, Michel (1 March 1990). The Use of Pleasure: The History of Sexuality. Vol. 2. Vintage Books. ISBN 978-0-394-75122-1. OCLC 5102034.
- Foucault, Michel (1 January 1995). Discipline and Punish: The Birth of the Prison. Translated by Sheridan, Allen. Random House. ISBN 978-0-679-75255-4. OCLC 32367111.
- Fraser, Nancy; Butler, Judith; Benhabib, Seyla; Cornell, Drucilla (6 April 1995). Feminist Contentions: A Philosophical Exchange. New York: Routledge. ISBN 978-0-415-91086-6. OCLC 30623637.
- Frug, Mary Joe. "A Postmodern Feminist Legal Manifesto (An Unfinished Draft)", in "Harvard Law Review", Vol. 105, No. 5, March, 1992, pp. 1045–1075. ISSN 0017-811X
- Grebowicz, Margret, ed. (4 January 2007). Gender After Lyotard. State University of New York Press. ISBN 978-0-7914-6956-9. OCLC 63472631.
- Healey, Joseph F. (25 March 2003). Race, Ethnicity, Gender and Class: the Sociology of Group Conflict and Change (3rd ed.). SAGE Publications. ISBN 978-0-7619-8763-5. OCLC 50604843.
- Kahlert, Heike; Schäfer, Sabine, eds. (2012). Engendering Transformation. Post-socialist Experiences on Work, Politics and Culture. Opladen, Berlin, London, Toronto: Barbara Budrich Publishers. ISBN 9783866494220.
- Hemmings, Clare (September 2016). "Is Gender Studies Singular? Stories of Queer/Feminist Difference and Displacement". differences: A Journal of Feminist Cultural Studies. 27 (2): 79–102. doi:10.1215/10407391-3621721.
- Khanna, Ranjana (September 2016). "On the Name, Ideation, and Sexual Difference". differences: A Journal of Feminist Cultural Studies. 27 (2): 62–78. doi:10.1215/10407391-3621709.
- Kristeva, Julia (14 May 1984) [First published 1980 in French as Pouvoirs de l'horreur by Éditions du Seuil]. Powers of Horror. Translated by Roudiez, Leon S. (Reprinted ed.). Columbia University Press. ISBN 978-0-231-05347-1. OCLC 8430152.
- Kupari, Helena; Vuola, Elina (2019). Orthodox Christianity and Gender: Dynamics of Tradition, Culture and Lived Practice. Routledge. doi:10.4324/9780203701188. hdl:10138/311897. ISBN 9780203701188.
- McElroy, Wendy (31 May 2001). Sexual Correctness: The Gender-Feminist Attack on Women. Jefferson, North Carolina: McFarland & Company. ISBN 978-0-7864-0226-7. OCLC 34839792.
- Oyěwùmí, Oyèrónkẹ́, ed. (13 October 2006). African Gender Studies: A Reader. London: Palgrave MacMillan. ISBN 978-1-4039-6283-6.
- Palmer, Bryan D. (25 January 1990). Descent into Discourse: The Reification of Language and the Writing of Social History (Critical Perspectives on the Past Series) (Reprint ed.). Philadelphia: Temple University Press. ISBN 978-0-87722-720-5. OCLC 233030494.
- Pinker, Susan (29 February 2008). The Sexual Paradox: Extreme Men, Gifted Women and the Real Gender Gap. Random House of Canada Ltd. ISBN 978-0-679-31415-8. OCLC 181078409.
- Pollock, Griselda (7 March 2001). Florence, Penny (ed.). Looking Back to the Future: 1990-1970: Essays on Art, Life and Death (Critical Voices in Art, Theory and Culture). Routledge. ISBN 978-90-5701-132-0. OCLC 42875273.
- Pollock, Griselda (22 November 2007). Encounters in the Virtual Feminist Museum: Time, Space and the Archive. Routledge. ISBN 978-0-415-41374-9. OCLC 129952714.
- Pulkkinen, Tuija (September 2016). "Feelings of Injustice: The Institutionalization of Gender Studies and the Pluralization of Feminism". differences: A Journal of Feminist Cultural Studies. 27 (2): 103–124. doi:10.1215/10407391-3621733. hdl:10138/174278.
- Reeser, Todd W. (12 January 2010). Masculinities in Theory: An Introduction. Wiley-Blackwell. ISBN 978-1405168601.
- Scott, Joan W. (1 February 2000). Gender and the Politics of History (2nd Revised ed.). Columbia University Press. ISBN 978-0231118576.
- Spector, Judith A., ed. (15 December 1986). Gender Studies: New Directions in Feminist Criticism. Bowling Green University Popular Press. ISBN 978-0-87972-351-4.
- Thomas, Calvin (1 October 1999). "Introduction: Identification, Appropriation, Proliferation". In Thomas, Calvin (ed.). Straight with a Twist: Queer Theory and the Subject of Heterosexuality. University of Illinois Press. ISBN 978-0-252-06813-3.
- Weed, Elizabeth (September 2016). "Gender and the Lure of the Postcritical". differences: A Journal of Feminist Cultural Studies. 27 (2): 153–177. doi:10.1215/10407391-3621757.
- Wright, Elizabeth (1 September 2000). Lacan and Postfeminism. Icon Books Ltd. ISBN 978-1-84046-182-4. OCLC 44484099.
- Zajko, Vanda; Leonard, Miriam, eds. (12 January 2006). Laughing with Medusa: Classical Myth and Feminist Thought (Classical Presences). Oxford University Press. ISBN 978-0-19-927438-3.
- de Zegher, M. Catherine, ed. (8 May 1996). Inside the Visible: Elliptical Traverse of Twentieth Century Art in, of and from the Feminine (2nd ed.). MIT Press. ISBN 978-0-262-54081-0. OCLC 33863951.
