= Louise A. Tilly =

American historian (1930–2018)

Louise Audino Tilly (December 13, 1930 – March 27, 2018) was an American historian known for utilizing an interdisciplinary approach to her scholarly work, fusing sociology with historical research. Biographer Carl J. Strikwerda states:

Louise Tilly has been one of the leaders in the growth of scholarship on women's history, the history of the family, and social history in the late 20th century, helping to create an interdisciplinary approach to the study of social change that combines anthropology, sociology, economics, and demography with traditional archival and historical research. Her central contributions have been in demonstrating the historical importance of women's labor, showing the crucial effects of demographic change on the work of women and children, and documenting the interrelations between economic developments and family life. Beyond these concerns, she has also contributed to the study of food riots, collective action, social movements, and social welfare.

== Education ==
At a young age, Tilly was influenced to study history by a fourth grade teacher. She acquired a bachelor's degree in history from Rutgers University (with honors) in 1952, followed by a master's degree from Boston University in 1955, and a Ph.D. at the University of Toronto in 1974.

== Career ==
An author, editor, contributing author, and editor of nine books and fifty scholarly articles, Louise A. Tilly examined the history from "ordinary people" and how they effect holistic social change. For example, in Tilly's last book Politics and Class in Milan, 1881–1901, she examined the duality of the working class and the rise of the socialist movement in Milan, Italy. Additionally, Tilly's research looked to find how industrialization, the formation of class, and welfare states effected gender and family structures throughout the world.

Louise A. Tilly, a recipient of notable grants such as the Rockefeller Foundation Population Policy, was also an evaluator of grants and fellowships for the National Science Foundation. Tilly taught as a professor at Michigan State University and the University of Michigan throughout the 1970s and 1980s. While at the University of Michigan, Tilly served as the director of the women's studies department during the same time period. Additionally, Tilly served as president of the American Historical Association in 1993. She later occupied the Michael E. Gellert Professor of History and Sociology, at the Graduate Faculty of the New School for Social Research, where she was also the chair on the Committee on Historical Studies.

Tilly and Joan Wallach Scott emphasized the continuity and the status of women, finding three stages in European history. In the preindustrial era, production was mostly for home use and women produce much of the needs of the households. The second stage was the "family wage economy" of early industrialization, the entire family depended on the collective wages of its members, including husband, wife and older children. The third or modern stage is the "family consumer economy," in which the family is the site of consumption, and women are employed in large numbers in retail and clerical jobs to support rising standards of consumption.

== Family ==
Louise Tilly's spouse was author and Professor Charles Tilly (1929–2008). Together they contributed ample research toward historical and sociological scholarship. The couple had four children: Christopher, Kit, Laura, and Sarah. Her brother-in-law was the economic historian Richard H. Tilly.

== Bibliography ==
- Tilly, Louise A., Scott, Joan W. (1978), Women, Work and Family. New York: Holt, Rinehart and Winston, 1978.
- Tilly, Louise A. (1992). Politics and class in Milan, 1881–1901. Oxford University Press. ISBN 978-0-19-506683-8.
- Tilly, Louise A. (1995), "Paths of proletarianization: organization of production, sexual division of labor, and women's collective action", in Brenner, Johanna; Laslett, Barbara; Arat, Yasmin (eds.), Rethinking the political: women, resistance, and the state, Chicago: University of Chicago Press, pp. 127–144, ISBN 978-0-226-07399-6.
- Charles Tilly / Louise Tilly / Richard H. Tilly: The Rebellious Century: 1830–1930, Harvard: Harvard University Press, 1975, ISBN 978-0-674-74955-9, 9780674749559
