= Benedict Alper =

American Criminologist

Benedict Solomon Alper
- Born: June 28, 1905; Revere, Massachusetts, United States
- Died: 1994
- Education: Harvard College; Harvard Institute of Criminal Law
- Occupations: Criminologist; Professor
- Years active: 1933–1993
- Employers: United Nations; Boston College
- Known for: First chief of the United Nations Criminal Justice and Crime Prevention Unit; Advocating alternatives to traditional punishment for juvenile offenders

Benedict Solomon Alper (28 June 1905 - 1994) was an American criminologist and chief of the United Nations Criminal Justice and Crime Prevention Unit.

== Life ==
Alper was born in Revere, Massachusetts and attended Harvard College and the Harvard Institute of Criminal Law. After completing his studies worked for Massachusetts Juvenile Court (1933-1935), Charlestown State Prison and the Federal Bureau of Prisons. Alper also worked as a research director of the Massachusetts Child Council, the New York State Legislature's Committee on the Courts (1941) and the American Parole Association (1942).

In 1943 Alper joined the United States Army and served in North Africa and Italy.

Alper was the first chief of the United Nations Criminal Justice and Crime Prevention Unit after its inception. He was also a founding member of the United Nations Staff Association and its first president, until his dismissal in 1951 due to his objection to racial segregation in the UN blood drive. His termination of the contract was one of the first brought before the Administrative Tribunal of the United Nations.

Alper taught at The New School for Social Research and, from 1966 to 1993, was a professor at Boston College. He was regarded as "a pioneer in advocating alternatives to traditional methods of punishment for juvenile offenders" and served as a member of the National Council on Crime and Delinquency and the Massachusetts Governor's Committee on Law Enforcement, Correctional Planning, Violence and Crime.
