= Kay Warren =

American anthropologist

Kay Barbara Warren
- Born: Kay Barbara Warren; February 10, 1947 (age 79)
- Education: Princeton University
- Scientific career
- Fields: Anthropology

Kay Barbara Warren (born February 10, 1947) is an American academic anthropologist, known for her extensive research and publications in cultural anthropology studies. Initially trained as an anthropologist specializing in field studies of Latin American and Mesoamerican indigenous cultures, Warren has also written and lectured on an array of broader anthropological topics. These include studies about the impacts on politically marginalized and indigenous communities of social movements, wars and political violence, transnationalism, and foreign aid programs. As of 2009 Warren holds an endowed chair as the Charles C. Tillinghast Jr. ’32 Professor in International Studies at Brown University,. Before joining the faculty at Brown in 2003, Warren held professorships at both Harvard and Princeton universities.

== Studies and academic career ==
Warren enrolled in undergraduate studies at University of California, Santa Barbara in 1965, where she completed a B.A. in cultural anthropology and cultural geography in 1968. Her graduate studies in cultural anthropology were undertaken at Princeton, where she completed her M.A. in 1970 and was awarded a PhD in 1974.

The year before completing her doctorate Warren took up a position as an instructor in anthropology at Mount Holyoke College, a liberal arts women's college in western Massachusetts. While at Mount Holyoke she taught an anthropology course at nearby Smith College, another women's college in Northampton, Massachusetts.

In 1982 Warren moved to Princeton University as associate professor. The same year she became the founding director of the Program in Women's Studies at Princeton. In 1988 Warren was made full professor, and from 1994 served as chair of the Anthropology Department.

Warren transferred to Harvard as professor in anthropology in 1998, and lectured there for the next five years. In 2003 she took up several concurrent appointments at Brown University — as Tillinghast Professor in International Studies, professor in anthropology, research professor at Watson Institute for International Studies. From 2011 to 2014, she served as director of the Pembroke Center for Teaching and Research on Women.

== Honors ==
Her awards include a Fulbright Senior Research Fellowship, Abe Fellowship (Japan), the École des Hautes Études en Sciences Sociales Fellowship, Member of Institute for Advanced Study, John Simon Guggenheim Fellowship, Wenner-Gren Fellowship, and the Lewis Henry Morgan Lectures.

== Research and fieldwork ==
In the early 1970s after completing her M.A., Warren conducted ethnographic field research among the Maya peoples of the Guatemalan highlands. Her work here formed the basis of her first book, The Symbolism of Subordination: Indian Identity in a Guatemalan Town (1978). Warren returned to Guatemala to update and continue her research in this area in 1989, and throughout the 1990s she spent a succession of annual field seasons among rural and urban highland Maya communities. This resulted in another book, Indigenous Movements and Their Critics: Pan-Maya Activism in Guatemala (1998).

Warren spent the better part of the decade from 1974 to 1985 involved with field assignments to the Andes and rural Peru, conducting a research program into social change, identity, and gender roles and constructs among the rural and indigenous Peruvian communities. Much of the research was carried out in collaboration with Susan Bourque, a politics and government academic from Smith College, with whom she co-authored Women of the Andes: Patriarchy and Social Change in Rural Peru, an ethnographic book that won several awards.
