= Gender: A Useful Category of Historical Analysis =

1986 article by Joan Wallach Scott

"Gender: A Useful Category of Historical Analysis" is an article by Joan Wallach Scott first published in the American Historical Review (AHR) in 1986. It is one of the most cited papers in the history of the AHR and was reprinted as part of Scott's 1988 book Gender and the Politics of History. In 2008, the AHR focused its December issue on the paper, featuring six articles on the paper, including one by Scott herself. At that time, "Gender: A Useful Category of Historical Analysis" was the most-visited AHR article on JSTOR, having been accessed more than 38,000 times since 1997 – more than 16,000 more views than the next most popular of that journal's articles.

== Argument ==
The paper begins by discussing three existing theoretical approaches to gender. Scott then provides her own definition of gender in two parts: gender is based on the perceived differences between the sexes, but is also a way of signifying power differentials. This second part of the definition is, according to William Sewell, "important and contentious", making a claim for the importance of gender in all areas of history. The paper argues that the field of gender history should focus on social and political construction of gender. It is, according to Dyan Elliott, a manifesto for the use of gender as a way of looking at the history of "male institutions". The paper was influenced by the French philosophers Jacques Derrida and Michel Foucault, and Scott was influenced by the linguistic turn in history.

== Reception ==
Many of the initial reactions to Scott's paper were highly negative. She has said that when she first presented it at a seminar in 1985, the audience "were, to a man, appalled". An early critic, Joan Hoff, accused Scott's paper of "nihilism, presentism, ahistoricism, obfuscation, elitism, obeisance to patriarchy, ethnocentrism, irrelevance, and possibly racism". Other critics were more positive. Linda Kerber called the paper "dazzling", while William Sewell called it an "instant classic".

== Legacy ==
Scott's 1986 paper had a significant longer-term impact. It was reprinted in 1988 as part of Gender and the Politics of History, a collection of Scott's essays on gender history, which was reissued in 1999 in a revised edition. Scott herself has published two papers responding to it: "Unanswered Questions" in 2008 and "Gender: Still a Useful Category of Analysis?" in 2010. It has been translated into several other languages, and Lola Sanchez called the Spanish translation of the paper "one of the most important texts of the past twenty-five years" for feminist scholars in Spain.

In 2008, Joanne Meyerowitz wrote that it had "no discernible date of expiration". By that time, it was required reading for "dozens of syllabi". It was described as "canonical" by the American Historical Review and was the journal's most-accessed article on JSTOR. Meyerowitz credits the paper with a "significant part in the broader shift from social to cultural history".
