= Differences (journal) =

- Discipline: Cultural studies
- Language: English
- Edited by: Elizabeth Weed; Ellen Rooney

Publication details
- History: 1989
- Publisher: Duke University Press
- Frequency: Triannually
- Impact factor: 0.310 (2015)

Standard abbreviations
- ISO 4: Differences

Indexing
- CODEN: DIFFEX
- ISSN: 1040-7391 (print); 1527-1986 (web)
- LCCN: 89650873
- OCLC no.: 186382457

Links
- Journal homepage; Online access; Online archive; Project MUSE archive (1998-2004)

Differences: A Journal of Feminist Cultural Studies (stylized differences) is a peer-reviewed academic journal that was established in 1989 by Naomi Schor and Elizabeth Weed. It covers research in cultural studies. As of 2021, the editors-in-chief are Elizabeth Weed, Ellen Rooney and Denise L Davis. The journal, though autonomous, is housed by the Pembroke Center for Teaching and Research on Women (Brown University). It was originally published by Indiana University Press, but since 2003 (volume 14) it has been published by Duke University Press.

== Abstracting and indexing ==
The journal is abstracted and indexed in:

- Academic Search Premier
- Alternative Press Index
- Contemporary Culture Index
- Current Contents/Social and Behavioral Sciences
- Expanded Academic ASAP
- Humanities Abstracts
- Humanities Index
- MLA Bibliography
- Scopus
- Social Sciences Citation Index
- Sociological Abstracts
- Studies on Women Abstracts
- Women Studies Abstracts

According to the Journal Citation Reports, the journal has a 2015 impact factor of 0.310, ranking it 31st out of 40 journals in the category "Women's Studies".

== See also ==
- List of women's studies journals
