= Cultural history of the United States =

Development of cultural activity in the United States

This article covers the cultural history of the United States primarily since its founding in the late 18th century. The region has had patterns of original settlement by different peoples, and later settler colonial states and societal setups. Various immigrant groups have been at play in the formation of the nation's culture. While different ethnic groups may display their own insular cultural aspects, throughout time a broad American culture has developed that encompasses the entire country. Developments in the culture of the United States in modern history have often been followed by similar changes in the rest of the world (American cultural imperialism).

This includes knowledge, customs, and arts of Americans, as well as events in the social, cultural, and political spheres.

== Before European colonization ==
Before European colonization began, the Americas were inhabited by a variety of indigenous tribes who each had their own unique society, economy, and culture. Further information on these indigenous groups can be found in the History of Native Americans in the United States article.

A system that developed in conjunction with European colonization was the Columbian exchange. The Columbian exchange was a system in which crops, animals, diseases, and cultural aspects were traded between Europe, Africa, Asia, and the Americas.Among these were concepts of liberty, private property, and labor.

== Colonial era ==
The United States was the first major British colony to become independent. Early into the American Revolution, the majority of the colonists still felt loyal to Britain and preferred reconciliation over independence. Close cultural relations eased the resumption of post-Revolution ties between the two nations and later aided their cooperation during World War II, giving rise to what became known as the Special Relationship. Both nations' cultural legacies and rising global stature led them to consider themselves as successors in certain ways to the Roman Empire, and American hegemony was able to peacefully succeed the British Empire's dominance in part due to the widely shared heritage.

=== American Revolution ===
By the 18th century, Americans felt less disconnected from civilization and instead felt themselves to be participants in a broader British network. In the mid-18th century, several musings began to appear on the possibility of the United States one day becoming a mighty nation with a great culture. Some of these drew upon the concepts of translatio imperii and translatio studii in arguing that American greatness would be the natural successor of previous forms of civilization, such as the Roman Empire.

== Postcolonial era ==
In the first few decades following the United States' independence, Americans remained culturally similar to Britons. These similarities have led some historians to note the War of 1812 as having "civil war" like qualities.

== Post-Civil War ==
The 12 years following the Civil War was known as the Reconstruction era and was marked by the many cultural and societal changes that took place. Following the end of the Civil War and the assassination of President Lincoln, the United States experienced many changes in the status quo that held before the war, despite the efforts of those in the South to prevent these changes. Southern state legislatures established a set of “Black Codes”; these codes prevented black people from renting or owning land, having firearms, and forced many black people to still work for their former owners. Along with these codes, there were violent attacks upon black people and the formation of the Ku Klux Klan. According to American historian Edward Ayers, groups like this enforced and perpetuated white supremacy throughout the South. Though there were groups that wanted to maintain the status quo as much as possible, there were white people who allied themselves with black people. There were sections of the Republican Party who strived to put forth and pass legislatures that would aid education, economic development, and put an end to public whipping.

Not long after the end of the war, a system developed between landowners and workers who did not have land of their own, this was called sharecropping. This system allowed black workers to share some of the profits that came from the produced goods, when before they were never given a profit. This system became a prominent influence on the economy in the South.

During Reconstruction, relationships between black men and black women also experienced change. Before slavery ended, those who were enslaved were able to create families despite the inability to legally get married and the very high possibility that they could be sold and separated from each other. Children that were born of these relationships were often raised by their mother alone, with no father present, and were always at risk of being taken from their mother as well. After slavery ended, black women and men had to reconstruct the meaning of family. Many women were hesitant to join men as they did not want to have to submit themselves to their husbands after gaining their freedom. At the same time, marriages were highly encouraged by churches and groups like the Freedmen's Bureau.

Further examples of how America's cultural was shaped during Reconstruction can be found in the article Reconstruction era § Culture.

== Contemporary era ==
In the aftermath of World War II, it became customary to look back to the failures of the interwar period and aim to prevent the "next war". During the Cold War, the federal government became more involved in maintaining civic memory, though local communities also celebrated events such as the American Civil War Centennial. The concept of being "cool" came into vogue during this time.

Diversity, equity, and inclusion (DEI) programs were instituted by the early 21st century to increase minority group advancement. During the second presidency of Donald Trump, anti-DEI policies were instituted at the federal level, leading to fewer depictions of minority history and culture by some government agencies.

== Justice system ==
The beginnings of the American justice system took place during Colonial America, before the American Revolution occurred. The criminal codes created by the American settlers were a combination of English laws, biblical laws, and local customs that developed in the colonies. At this time the United States did not have established police forces, public attorneys, or separate courts and jails. This lack of a formal system encourage an informal version to develop that left enforcement responsibilities in the hands of private citizens. Further differences seen during this era, compared to the modern justice system, was the different forms of punishment. Long term incarceration was not the norm during this time. Instead the colonists used scarlet letters, fines, stockades, whipping, indentured servitude, exile, and hangings to punish criminals.

In 1838, the United States experienced a change from an informal and private police force to a public, government established police force. This occurred when the city of Boston developed a professional police department, with officers patrolling the city. New York followed Boston's lead and began the tradition of having officers "walk beats". The development of public prosecutors, public defense attorneys, plea bargains, and juvenile courts followed in the next 50 years, along with the practice of incarcerating people in prisons.

The criminal justice system in the following decades experienced much reform that led to America's modern system, especially in the 1960s and 70s. More information on the modern reforms can be found on the Criminal justice reform in the United States page.

== American individualism ==
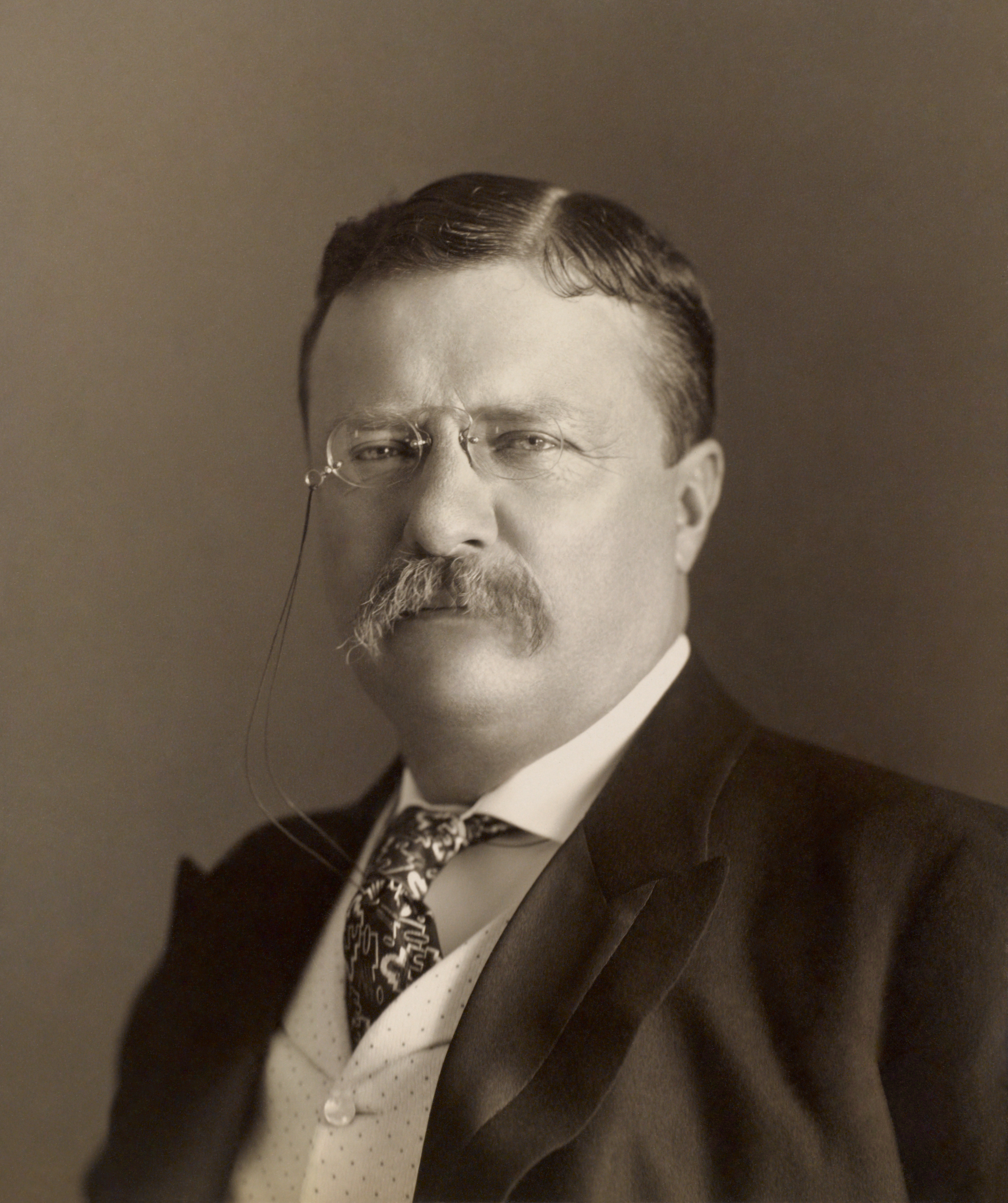
Theodore Roosevelt aimed to strengthen the American character, as expressed in his 1900 Strenuous Life speech.

American individualism's origins date back as early as the Revolutionary period. The ideas of the Enlightenment influenced many of the Founding Fathers' philosophies on government and its relationship with individual rights. The founding documents of the United States, particularly the Bill of Rights, sought to protect individual rights and promote free expression of its citizens, ideals that emerged during the Enlightenment.

As the United States expanded westward, individualism became synonymous with the frontier character. Coined by President Herbert Hoover as "rugged individualism" in 1928, many Americans developed a strong oppositional stance to the government in their lives. The brand of western individualism was defined by self-reliance as a result of living in remote areas. Today, attitudes of individualism are still prevalent in many areas that made up the western frontier. This is especially the case when it comes to counties with lower population densities.

In the 19th century, American exceptionalism influenced belief in a unique trajectory for the new nation, which was ascribed to factors such as divine intervention, successful republicanism, and geography. Over time, economic growth and improvements to quality of life have generally increased Americans' ability to be self-reliant while participating in broader society.

=== Democracy ===
In the early decades of independence, there was an intense effort to inscribe civic virtue into the fabric of the new republic, as seen in the Greek and Roman architecture built at the time and the commemoration of unifying figures such as the Marquis de Lafayette and George Washington.

The equalizing nature of American democracy also gave rise to some of the unique divisions in the country: it reduced hierarchies among white men, but put them at greater odds with those who were initially outside of democratic society, namely white women and racial minorities.

== Economy and technology ==
Though technological progress was slow in the colonial era, ideas from the European and Christian heritage of early Americans led to a focus on improving material life.

During the Gilded Age of the late 19th century, the rise of corporations and the industrial restructuring of the economy were major factors that changed American society. The Great Railroad Strike of 1877 fed into the rise of populism, with general anxieties around reduction of economic opportunity playing a role. Americans became more tied to metropolitan centers, and were being influenced by private organizations that formed a new national life. Economic growth was linked to moral progress, but also gave rise to concerns of staidness and people becoming "overcivilized".

== International involvement ==
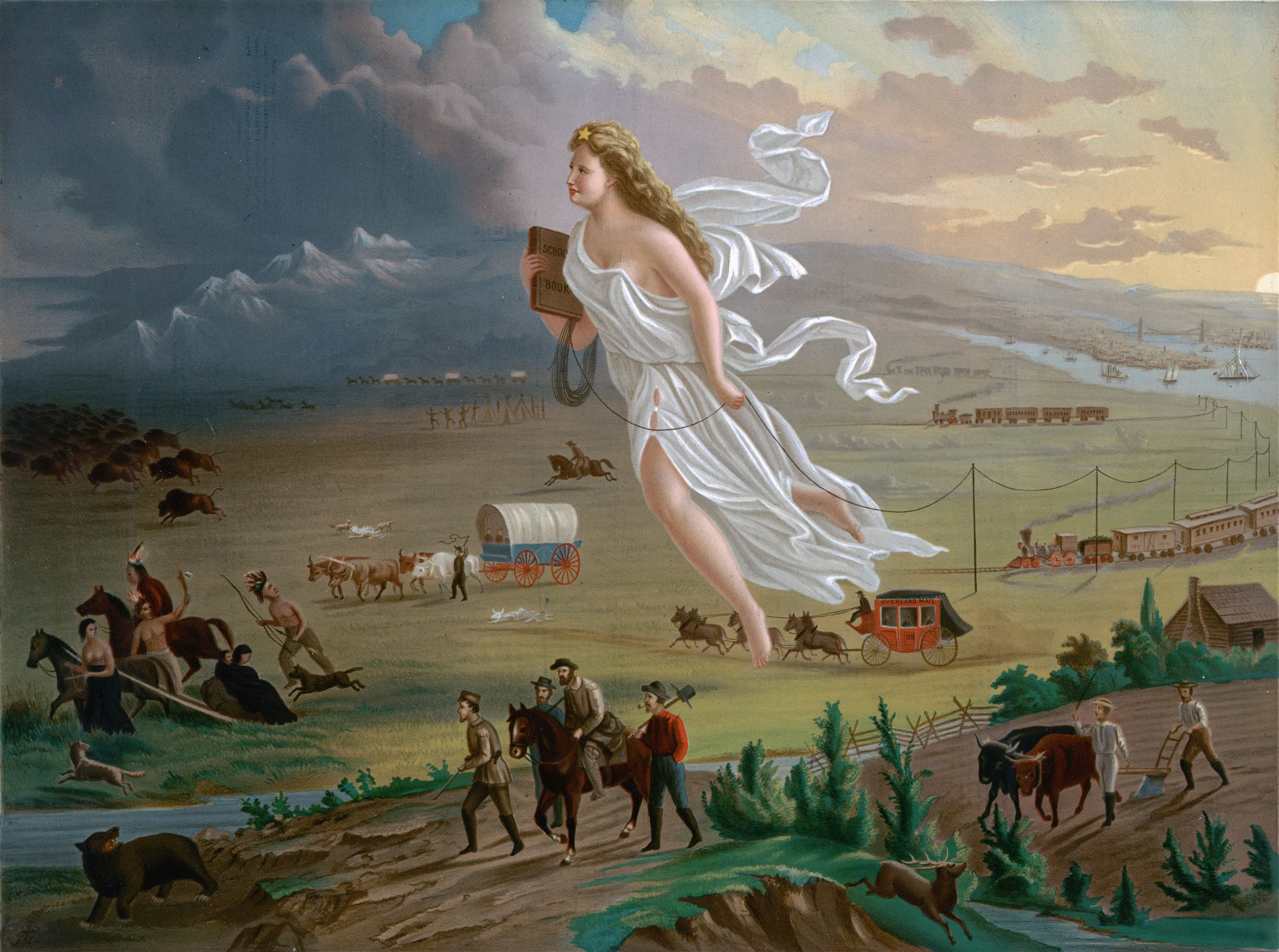
Belief in the progress of an American civilization meant to affect the world was represented by 19th-century proponents of western expansion.

Upon independence, the United States began to divorce itself from its British heritage, often writing its own history in a way that failed to capture long-term continuities with British and European traditions. This allowed the new nation to more easily impact the world in a way which it could claim as its own, but muddied the waters around the nature and utility of American imperialism.

American involvement in the world became more intense after the Civil War, as the nation stabilized and its economy industrialized. By the 1890s, the reduction in economic opportunity, spurred on by the closing of the frontier and the increasing economic inequality observed in cities, was weakening confidence in the direction of the nation; some aimed to counter this trend by forcefully expanding American involvement in the world. The new national pastime of baseball became an encapsulation of American values on a global stage, sometimes being exported as part of military expeditions. Sports in general came to form a significant part of American outreach to the world, channeling the nation's desire to civilize and integrate with the world, though sometimes facing local resistance and adaptations.

In the first Cold War decades, a newly hegemonic United States began culturally influencing the world on a larger scale (see also: United States cultural exchange programs); however, the country maintained information barriers and concerns around absorbing international influences. The shock of the Vietnam War then disrupted American unity and created a scarring disruption that altered society.

== Immigration ==
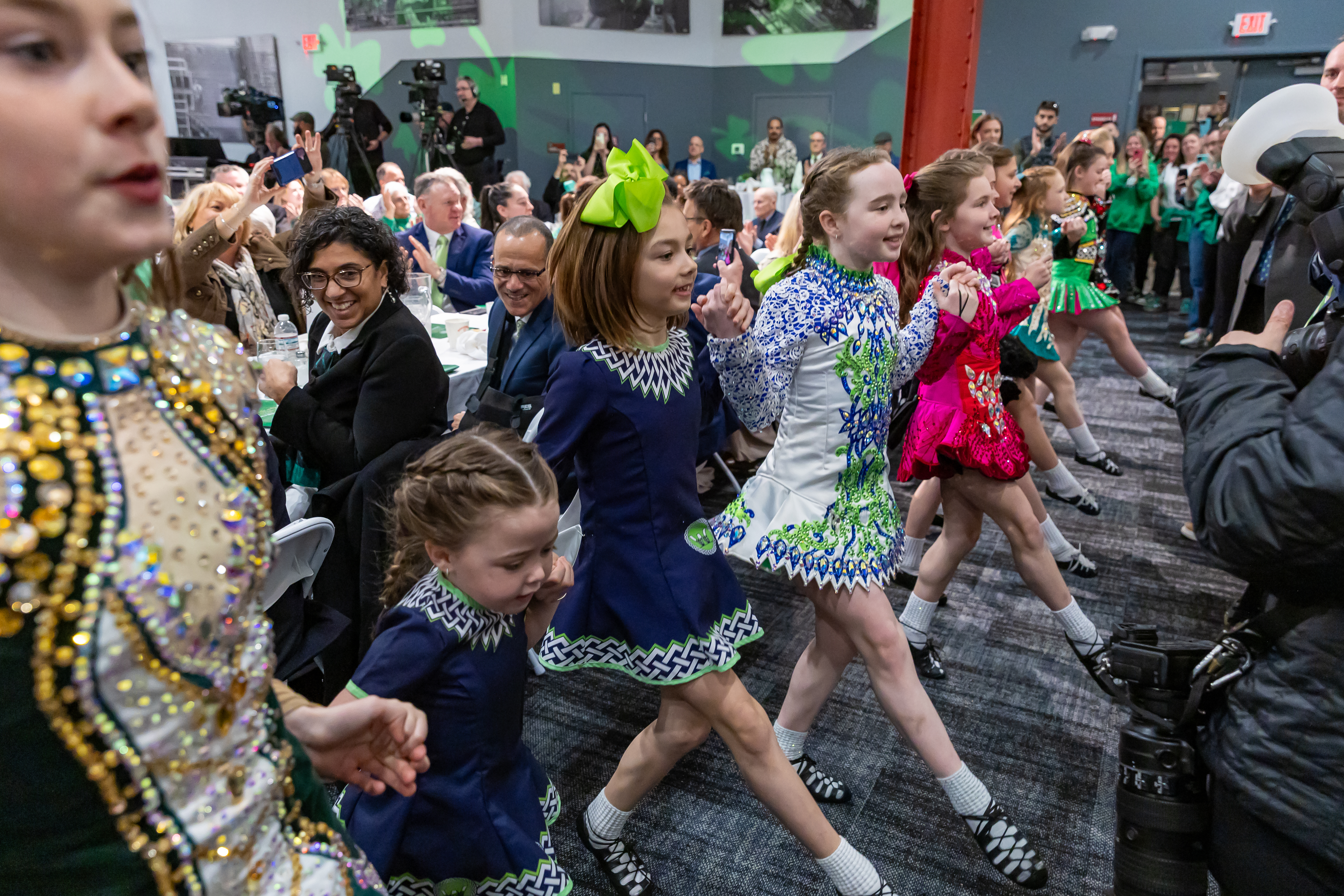
Irish immigrants introduced Saint Patrick's Day celebrations.

The first centuries of European migration to the United States abounded with optimism around and exploration of the unique possibilities of the new nation. British immigrants brought the diversity of their homeland along with ideas around the possibilities and importance of societal progress (see also: civilizing mission).

Immigration from the turn of the 20th century onward began to reshape American society, encouraging an identity forged around civic participation rather than ancestry. Initially, many immigrants self-segregated out of mainstream American society, with the World Wars then offering a backdrop to American policies that sought to utilize or suppress ethnic uniqueness among European groups. The metaphor of the melting pot came to be used, symbolizing the possibility of overcoming divisions while learning from them. However, an anti-immigrant stance was adopted by the end of the Roaring Twenties.

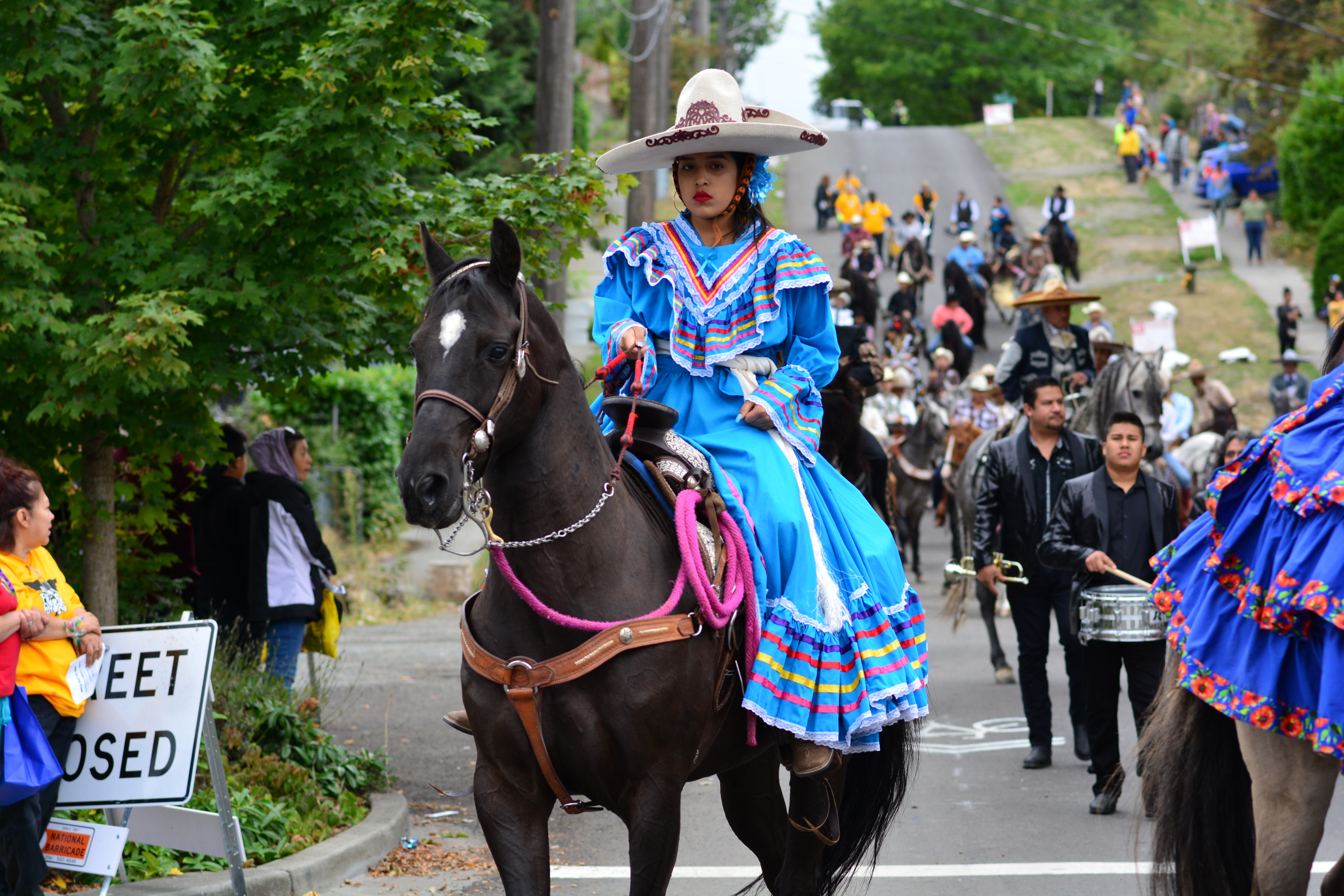
Mexican influences are often visible in modern American culture.

By the turn of the 21st century, new computing and transportation technologies and the impact of globalization also played a significant role in how immigrants entered and altered American culture.

== See also ==
- American studies
- Architecture of the United States
- Cuisine of the United States
- Cultural policy of the United States
- History of education in the United States
- History of women in the United States
- History of religion in the United States
  - Christianity in the United States
- Subcultures:
  - History of African-American culture
- Entertainment:
  - Cinema of the United States
  - Television in the United States
  - Sports in the United States
  - Theater of the United States
  - Video gaming in the United States
- Fine arts:
  - Dance of the United States
  - Literature of the United States
  - Music history of the United States
  - Music of the United States
  - Poetry of the United States
  - Sculpture of the United States
  - Visual arts of the United States
