= Awakatek =

Awakatek may refer to:

- Awakatek people, an ethnic group of Guatemala
- Awakatek language, a Mayan language
