= Qʼeqchiʼ language =

Mayan language spoken in Guatemala and Belize

Qʼeqchiʼ
- Kekchi
- Q'eqchi'
- Pronunciation: [qʼeqt͡ʃiʔ]
- Native to: Guatemala, Belize, Mexico
- Region: Alta Verapaz, Petén, Izabal, Baja Verapaz, El Quiché; Toledo; Campeche, Quintana Roo, Chiapas
- Ethnicity: Qʼeqchiʼ
- Native speakers: 1.3 million (2019 census)
- Language family: Mayan: Quichean–Mamean; Greater Quichean; Qʼeqchiʼ
- Dialects: Western; Eastern
- Writing system: Latin

Official status
- Official language in: Guatemala; Mexico
- Regulated by: Instituto Nacional de Lenguas Indígenas; Academía de las Lenguas Mayas de Guatemala

Language codes
- ISO 639-3: kek
- Glottolog: kekc1242
- ELP: Q'eqchi'
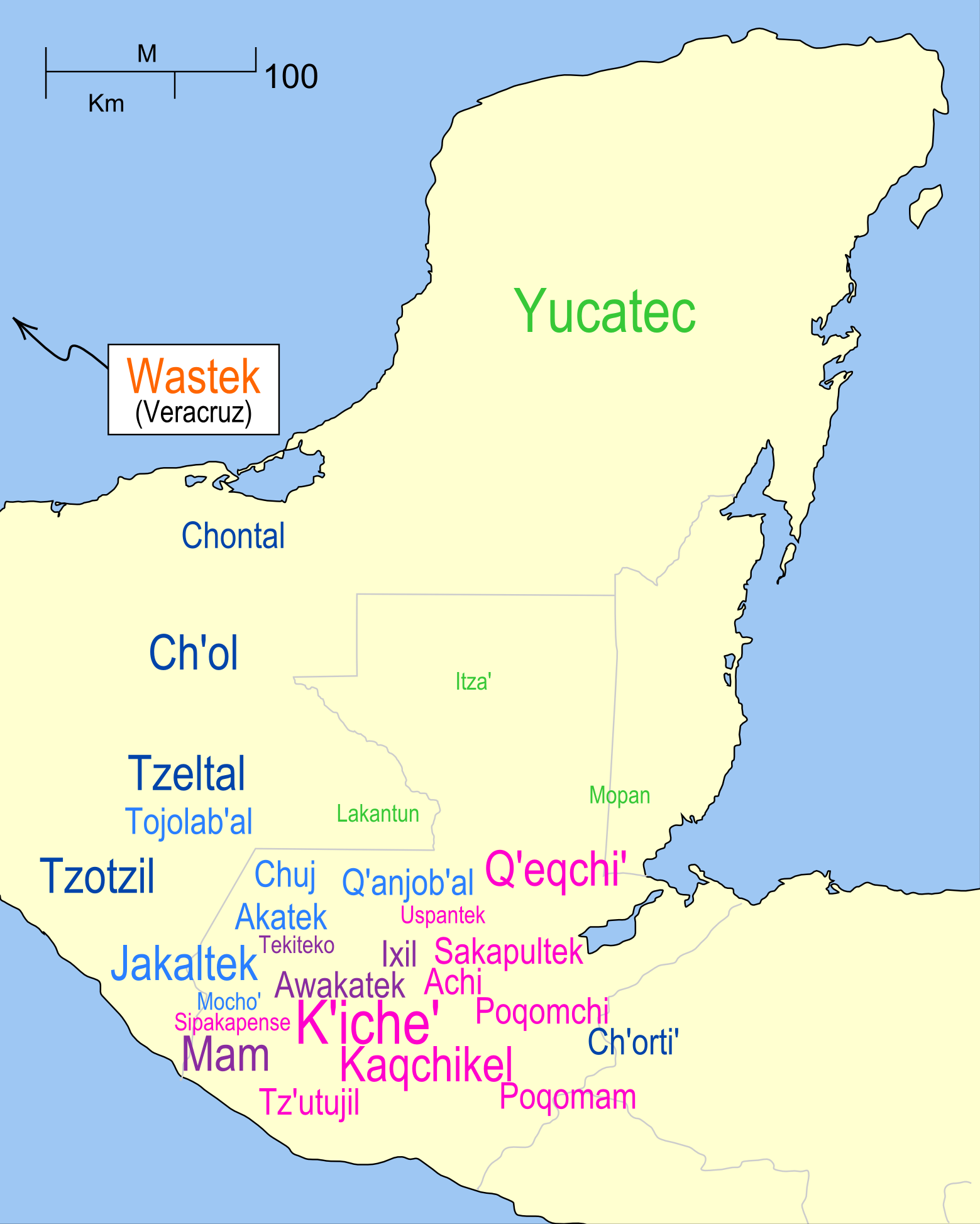
- Map of Mayan languages. Qʼeqchiʼ is in pink, at the lower-center part of the map.

The Qʼeqchiʼ language, also spelled Kekchi, Kʼekchiʼ, or Kekchí, is one of the Mayan languages from the Quichean branch, spoken within Qʼeqchiʼ communities in Guatemala, Mexico, and Belize. Like many other Mayan languages, Qʼeqchiʼ is an ergative–absolutive language. It has 29 consonants and 10 vowels. With few exceptions, stress always falls on the final syllable.

== Distribution ==
The area where Qʼeqchiʼ is spoken spreads across northern Guatemala into southern Belize. There are also Qʼeqchiʼ speaking communities in Mexico.

In Mexico, Q'eqchi' is spoken in the states of Campeche, Quintana Roo and Chiapas, mainly in the communities of Quetzal-Etzná and Los Laureles, in the Campeche Municipality and in Maya Tecun II and Santo Domingo Kesté in the Champotón Municipality, state of Campeche.

It was calculated that the core of the Qʼeqchiʼ-speaking area in northern Guatemala extends over 24,662 square kilometers (about 9,522 square miles). The departments and specific municipalities where Qʼeqchiʼ is regularly spoken in Guatemala include:

Department	Municipalities where Qʼeqchiʼ is spoken
Alta Verapaz	Chahal, Chisec, Cobán, Fray Bartolomé de las Casas, Lanquín, Panzós, Chamelco, Carchá, Cahabón, Senahú, Tucurú
Baja Verapaz	Purulhá
Petén	La Libertad, Poptún, San Luis, Sayaxché
Quiché	Ixcán, Playa Grande, Uspantán
Izabal	El Estor, Livingston, Morales

In the country of Belize, Qʼeqchiʼ is spoken in the Toledo District. Qʼeqchiʼ is the first language of many communities in the district, and the majority of Maya in Toledo speak it.

Terrence Kaufman described Qʼeqchiʼ as having two principal dialect groups: the eastern and the western. The eastern group includes the varieties spoken in the municipalities of Lanquín, Chahal, Chahabón and Senahú, and the western group is spoken everywhere else.

== Phonology ==
Below are the Qʼeqchiʼ phonemes, represented with the International Phonetic Alphabet. To see the official alphabet, see the chart in the Orthographies section of this article.

=== Consonants ===
Qʼeqchiʼ has 29 consonants, 3 of which were loaned from Spanish.

Qʼeqchiʼ consonant phonemes
		Bilabial	Alveolar	Post-alv./ Palatal	Velar	Uvular	Glottal
Nasal		m	n				
Plosive	voiceless	p	t		k	q	ʔ
Plosive	glottalized	pʼ (Note: In their respective descriptive grammars of Qʼeqchiʼ, both Juan Tzoc Choc and Stephen Stewart have the bilabial implosive as a voiced /ɓ/. The report on Qʼeqchiʼ dialect variation by Sergio Caz Cho, however, only discusses this consonant as a voiceless /ɓ̥/.)	tʼ		kʼ	qʼ	
Plosive	voiced (Note: The non-glottalized voiced plosives /b d ɡ/ have appeared as a result of influence from Spanish.)	b	d		ɡ		
Affricate	voiceless		ts	tʃ			
Affricate	glottalized		tsʼ	tʃʼ			
Fricative			s	ʃ		χ	h
Liquid	tap		ɾ				
Liquid	lateral		l				
Semivowel		w		j			

=== Vowels ===
Qʼeqchiʼ has 10 vowels, which differ in quality and also in length.

Qʼeqchiʼ vowel phonemes
	Front	Central	Back
Close	i iː		u uː
Mid	e eː		o oː
Open		a aː	

=== Prosody ===
With a few exceptions—interjections, such as uyaluy, and adjectives which have an unstressed clitic on the end—stress always falls on the final syllable.

== Grammar ==
Like many other Mayan languages, Qʼeqchiʼ is an ergative–absolutive language, which means that the object of a transitive verb is grammatically treated the same way as the subject of an intransitive verb. Individual morphemes and morpheme-by-morpheme glosses in this section are given in IPA, while "full words," or orthographic forms, are given in the Guatemalan Academy of Mayan Languages orthography.

=== Morphology ===
There are two kinds of pronouns in Qʼeqchiʼ: independent pronouns and pronominal affixes. The independent pronouns are much like pronouns in English or Spanish, while the pronominal affixes are attached to words such as nouns, verbs, and statives and used for inflection. Like other Mayan languages, Qʼeqchiʼ has two sets of pronominal affixes, referred to as set A and set B. The following table provides all the pronominal affixes.

Pronominal Affixes
	Set A		Set B
person	prevocalic	preconsonantal	Set B
singular
1st	w	in	in
2nd	aːw	aː	at
3rd	ɾ	ʃ	∅
plural
1st	q	qa	oː-, -o
2nd	eːr	eː	eʃ
3rd	ɾ- -eɓ / -eʔɾ	ʃ- -eɓ / eʔx	-eʔ / -eɓ

When these affixes are attached to transitive verbs, set A affixes indicate the ergative agent while set B indicates the absolutive object.

Transitive Verbs
Prevocalic						Preconsonantal					
translation	full word	morpheme breakdown				translation	full word	morpheme breakdown			
translation	full word	Tense/aspect	Set B	Set A	base	translation	full word	Tense/aspect	Set B	Set A	base
we saw you	xatqil	ʃ	at	q	il	I called you	xatinbʼoq	ʃ	at	in	ɓoq
they saw you	xateʼril	ʃ	at	eʔɾ	il	s/he called you	xatxbʼoq	ʃ	at	ʃ	ɓoq

When a set B affix is attached to an intransitive verb, it indicates the subject of the intransitive verb.

Intransitive Verbs
translation	full word	morpheme breakdown		
translation	full word	Tense/aspect	Set B	base
singular
I slept	xinwar	ʃ	in	waɾ
you slept	xatwar	ʃ	at	waɾ
s/he slept	xwar	ʃ	∅	waɾ
plural
we slept	xoowar	ʃ	oo	waɾ
you (pl.) slept	xexwar	ʃ	eʃ	waɾ
they slept	xeʼwar	ʃ	eʔ	waɾ

When an affix from set A is prefixed to a noun, it indicates possession. As their name suggests, the prevocalic forms of set A affixes are only found before vowels. However, the rules for the distribution of "preconsonantal" set A prefixes on nouns are more complex, and they can sometimes be found before vowels as well as consonants. For example, loan words (principally from Spanish) are found with preconsonantal affixes, regardless of whether they begin with a consonant or not. In contrast, kinship and body part words—which are words very unlikely to be loaned—always take the prevocalic prefixes if they begin with vowels. The following chart contrasts these two situations.

Possession of nouns
Body part and kinship terms			Loan words			
English	correct	incorrect	English	Spanish	correct	incorrect
my wife	wixaqil	*inixaqil	my manure/fertilizer	mi abono	inabʼoon	*wabʼoon
my older brother	was	*inas	my altar	mi altar	inartal	*wartal
my tongue	waqʼ	*inaqʼ	my sugar	mi azúcar	inasuukr	*wasuukr

When an affix of set B serves as the suffix of a stative, it indicates the subject or theme of the stative.

Inflected statives
translation	Qʼeqchiʼ	
translation	full word	morphemes
he/she/it is big	nim	nim – ∅
we are big	nimo	nim – o
you (pl.) are three	oxibʼex	oʃiɓ – eʃ
they are three	oxibʼebʼ	oʃiɓ – eɓ
I am far	najtin	naχt – in
you are far	najtat	naχt – at

Statives can be derived from nouns. The process simply involves suffixing the set B pronominal affix to the end of the root.

Noun as stative
translation	Qʼeqchiʼ	
translation	full words	morphemes
man	winq	winq
you are a man	winqat	winq – at
he is a man	winq	winq – ∅

=== Syntax ===
The basic word order of Qʼeqchiʼ sentences is verb – object – subject, or VOS. SVO, VSO, SOV, OVS, and OSV word orders are all possible in Qʼeqchiʼ, but each have a specific use and set of restrictions. The definiteness and animacy of the subject and object can both have effects on the word order. Like many languages, the exact rules for word order in different situations vary from town to town in the Qʼeqchiʼ speaking area.

Examples of basic word order
		Qʼeqchiʼ			translation		
		verb	object	subject	subject	verb	object
transitive	full words	Xril	li wakax	li chʼajom	The young man	saw	the cattle
transitive	morphemes	ʃ – ∅ – ɾ – il	li wakaʃ	li tʃʼaχom	The young man	saw	the cattle
intransitive	full words	Xkam		li tzʼiʼ	The dog	died	
intransitive	morphemes	ʃ – ∅ – kam		li tsʼiʔ	The dog	died	

== Orthography ==
Several writing systems have been developed for Qʼeqchiʼ, but only two are in widespread use: SIL and ALMG.

=== Early transcriptions ===
The first transcriptions of Qʼeqchiʼ in the Latin alphabet were made by Roman Catholic friars in the 16th century. Francisco de la Parra devised additional letters to represent the unfamiliar consonants of Mayan languages, and these were used to write Qʼeqchiʼ. Examples of Qʼeqchiʼ written with the de la Parra transcription can be seen in the 18th century writing of the Berendt-Brinton Linguistic Collection (Rare Book & Manuscript Library, University of Pennsylvania, Ms. Coll. 700). In the 20th century, before Sedat and Eachus & Carlson developed their SIL orthography, field researchers devised alternate Latin transcriptions. For example, Robert Burkitt (an anthropologist fluent in spoken Qʼeqchiʼ and familiar with a range of Qʼeqchiʼ communities and language variation), in his 1902 paper "Notes on the Kekchí Language", uses a transcription based on then-current Americanist standards.

=== SIL/IIN ===
A Spanish-style orthography was developed by Summer Institute of Linguistics (SIL) field researchers, principally William Sedat in the 1950s and Francis Eachus and Ruth Carlson in the 1960s. This alphabet was officialized by the Guatemalan Ministry of Education through the Instituto Indigenista Nacional de Guatemala, or the IIN. Although no longer considered standard, this orthography remains in circulation in large part due to the popularity of a few texts including the Protestant Bible produced by the SIL/Wycliffe Bible Translation Project, and a widely used language learning workbook "Aprendamos Kekchí".

=== ALMG ===
The Proyecto Lingüístico Francisco Marroquín (PLFM) developed an alternative orthography in the late 1970s, which was influenced by the International Phonetic Alphabet (IPA). Of note, the PLFM orthography used the number "7" to write the glottal plosive, whereas the apostrophe was used in digraphs and trigraphs to write ejective stops and affricates. This system was later modified by the Academia de Lenguas Mayas de Guatemala (ALMG), which replaced the "7" with the apostrophe. The result, the ALMG orthography, has been the standard, official way to write Qʼeqchiʼ, at least in Guatemala, since 1990. In the ALMG orthography, each grapheme (or "letter", including digraphs and trigraphs) is meant to correspond to a particular phoneme. These include separate vowels for long and short sounds, as well as the use of apostrophes (saltillos) for writing ejectives and the glottal stop. The following table matches each of the official ALMG graphemes with their IPA equivalents.

Comparison of the ALMG Qʼeqchiʼ orthography to the IPA
ALMG	a	aa	bʼ	ch	chʼ	e	ee	h	i	ii	j	k	kʼ	l	m	n	o	oo	p	q	qʼ	r	s	t	tʼ	tz	tzʼ	u	uu	w	x	y	ʼ
IPA	a	aː	ɓ	tʃ	tʃʼ	e	eː	h	i	iː	χ	k	kʼ	l	m	n	o	oː	p	q	qʼ	r	s	t	tʼ	ts	tsʼ	u	uː	w	ʃ	j	ʔ

=== Comparison of the two major orthographies ===
Comparative examples of the ALMG and SIL orthographies
ALMG	SIL	English translation
maakʼa ta chinkʼul saʼ laa muhebʼal aakiʼchebal	maacʼa ta chincʼul saʼ laa muhebal aaquiʼchebaal	May nothing happen to me in your shady places and your forests.
yo chi amaqʼink laj Kachil Petén	yo chi amakʼinc laj Cachil Petén	Carlos lives (is living) in Petén.

== History ==
At the time of the Spanish conquest of the Americas, Qʼeqchiʼ was probably spoken by fewer people than neighboring languages such as Itzaʼ, Mopan, and Chʼoltiʼ, all of which are now moribund or extinct. The main evidence for this fact is not colonial documents, but the prevalence of loan words apparently stemming from these languages in Qʼeqchiʼ. However, a number of factors made Qʼeqchiʼ do better than the just-mentioned languages. One is the difficult mountainous terrain which is its home. Another is that, rather than simply being conquered, as the Choltiʼ, or resisting conquest for an extended period, as the Itzaʼ did for over 200 years, the Qʼeqchiʼ came to a particular arrangement with the Spaniards, by which Dominican priests, led initially by Fray Bartolome de las Casas, were allowed to enter their territory and proselytize undisturbed, whereas no lay Spaniards were admitted. This led to their territory being renamed "Verapaz" (true peace) by the Spaniards, a name which continues today in the Guatemalan departments Alta Verapaz and Baja Verapaz. This relatively favorable early development allowed the people to spread, and even make war on neighboring Mayan groups. Although it was later followed by the brutal policies of the late-19th-century liberals and the late-20th century military governments, it largely explains the status of Qʼeqchiʼ as the 3rd largest Mayan language in Guatemala and the 4th across the Mayan region. The relatively recent, postcolonial expansion is also the reason that Qʼeqchiʼ is perhaps the most homogeneous of the larger Mayan languages.

Qʼeqchiʼ is taught in public schools through Guatemala's intercultural bilingual education programs.

== Texts ==
Like most other Mayan languages, Qʼeqchiʼ is still in the process of becoming a written and literary language. Existing texts can roughly be divided into the following categories.

1. Educational texts meant to teach people how to speak, read or write Qʼeqchiʼ. This category includes materials such as dictionaries and grammars, as well as workbooks designed to be used in rural Guatemala schools in communities where the majority of the people are native speakers of Qʼeqchiʼ.
2. Religious texts. The Protestant version of the Bible (published by the SIL based on the work of William Sedat, and Eachus and Carlson) mentioned above is probably the most widely available text in Qʼeqchiʼ. In the last twenty years or so, the Roman Catholic Church has been one of the primary proponents of written Qʼeqchiʼ. Various Catholic organizations are responsible for producing a number of texts, including the New Testament, Genesis and Exodus, and various instructional pamphlets. A songbook entitled Qanimaaq Xloqʼal li Qaawaʼ 'We praise the Lord' is very popular among Catholics, has been in print for many years, and is updated with new songs regularly. The Book of Mormon also is available in Qʼeqchiʼ as are also other LDS religious texts.
3. Non-instructive secular texts have also begun to appear in the last ten years or so, although they are still few in number. The most ambitious of these works have been a free translation of the Kʼicheʼ text Popol Wuj ("Popol Vuh") by the Qʼeqchiʼ language teacher and translator Rigoberto Baq Qaal (or Baʼq Qʼaal), and a collection of Qʼeqchiʼ folk tales. A number of government documents have also been translated into Qʼeqchiʼ, including the Guatemalan Constitution.

== Bibliography ==
=== Grammars of Qʼeqchiʼ ===
- Caz Cho, Sergio (2007). Xtzʼilbʼal rix li aatinak saʼ Qʼeqchiʼ = Informe de variación dialectal en Qʼeqchiʼ = (in Spanish). Antigua, Guatemala; Guatemala, Guatemala: Oxlajuuj Keej Mayaʼ Ajtzʼiibʼ (OKMA); Cholsamaj. ISBN 9789992253526. OCLC 202514532.
- Eachus, Francis; Carlson, Ruth (1980). Aprendamos kekchí: Gramática pedagógica popular de kekchí. Guatemala: Instituto Lingüístico del Verano (Summer Institute of Linguistics). This is a pedagogical grammar, rather than a descriptive grammar like the majority in this section.
- Stewart, Steven (1980). Gramática kekchí (in Spanish). Editorial Academica Centro America: Guatemala. OCLC 318333627. This grammar does not include syntax. The area of study for the book was Cobán and the surrounding towns of San Pedro Carchá, San Juan Chamelco, and Chamil.
- Stoll, Otto (1896). Die Sprache der Kʼeʼkchí-Indianer (in German).
- Tzoc Choc, Juan; Álvarez Cabnal, Alfredo; Carlos Federico, Hun Macz; Sacul Caal, Hugo; the Qʼeqchiʼ language community (2003). Gramática descriptiva del idioma maya qʼeqchiʼ = Xtzʼilbʼal rix xnaʼlebʼil li aatinobʼaal qʼeqchiʼ (in Spanish). Cobán, Alta Verapaz, Guatemala: Academia de las Lenguas Mayas de Guatemala. pp. 114–115. OCLC 654408920.
- Tzoc Choc, Juan; Álvarez Cabnal, Alfredo; the Qʼeqchiʼ language community (2004). Gramática normativa qʼeqchiʼ (in Spanish). Guatemala: Academia de las Lenguas Mayas de Guatemala. This is a normative grammar, rather than a descriptive grammar like the majority in this section.

=== Articles on Qʼeqchiʼ ===
- Burkitt, Robert (1902). "Notes on the Kekchí". American Anthropologist. 4 (3): 441–63. doi:10.1525/aa.1902.4.3.02a00060.
- Campbell, Lyle (1973). "The Philological Documentation of a Variable Rule in the History of Pokom and Kekchi". International Journal of American Linguistics. 39 (3): 133–134. doi:10.1086/465256. ISSN 0020-7071. S2CID 144373640.
- Campbell, Lyle (1974). "Theoretical Implications of Kekchi Phonology". International Journal of American Linguistics. 40 (4, Part 1): 269–278. doi:10.1086/465323. ISSN 0020-7071. S2CID 145437918.
- DeChicchis, Joseph (March 2011). "Revisiting an imperfection in Mayan orthography" (PDF). Journal of Policy Studies (37). Archived from the original (PDF) on 2014-11-03 – via Kwansei Gakuin University Repository.
- Kockelman, Paul (2003-08-01). "The Meanings of Interjections in Qʼeqchiʼ Maya: From Emotive Reaction to Social and Discursive Action". Current Anthropology. 44 (4): 467–490. doi:10.1086/375871. ISSN 0011-3204. S2CID 150128538.
- Wichmann, Soeren (2007). "Loanwords in Qʼeqchiʼ, a Mayan language of Guatemala" (PDF). Archived from the original (PDF) on 2009-05-19.

=== Dictionaries of Qʼeqchiʼ ===
- Frazier, Jeffrey (2015). Qʼeqchiʼ Mayan Thematic Dictionary: Tusbʼil Molobʼaal Aatin Qʼeqchiʼ ~ Inkles (in Qʼeqchiʼ and English). Mayaglot; 1 edition (June 21, 2015). ISBN 978-1514812280.
- Frazier, Jeffrey (2015). Qʼeqchiʼ Mayan Dictionary: Molobʼaal Aatin Qʼeqchiʼ ~ Inkles (in Qʼeqchiʼ and English). Mayaglot; 1 edition (December 11, 2015). ISBN 978-0692602096.
- Haeserijn, Esteban (1979). Diccionario kʼekchiʼ español (in Spanish).
- Sedat, William (1955). Nuevo diccionario de las lenguas Kʼekchiʼ y española (in Spanish). Guatemala: Alianza para el Progreso.
- Tuyuc Sucuc, Cecilio (2001). Xtusulal aatin saʼ qʼeqchiʼ = Vocabulario qʼeqchiʼ (PDF) (in Qʼeqchiʼ and Spanish). Academia de Lenguas Mayas de Guatemala, Comunidad Lingüística Qʼeqchiʼ.
