= Mexifornia =

Fictional city based on Calexico, California in the Fox television series, "Bordertown."

Mexifornia (also Calexico or Califaztlán) is a portmanteau of Mexico and California.

== Description ==
Mexifornia refers to what some see as the Mexicanization or Hispanicization of the U.S. state of California as a result of increased legal and illegal migration of Mexican and other Hispanic people into California and the transformation of many aspects of the culture of the state.

Mexifornia is seen as a state level version of what is now known as Amexica, the merging of America and Mexico;

"The United States of "Amexica" share more than a border and a common heritage: both sides welcome the benefits of trade but struggle with the pressures of growth". Time magazine.

This is a topic of a heated debate between the advocates of amnesty for illegal immigrants on one side and those wishing to enforce immigration laws on the other side.

== Popular culture ==
- Mexifornia is the main setting of the cartoon Bordertown

== See also ==
- Anti-Mexican sentiment
- Chicano
- Chicano Movement
- Chicano nationalism
- Immigration to the United States
- La Raza
- Reconquista (Mexico)
- Demographics of California
- Southern Border Region (California)
- Mexicali
