= Intercultural bilingual education =

Language planning model

Intercultural bilingual education (Educación bilingüe intercultural) is a language planning model employed in public education throughout Latin America. It arose as a political movement asserting space for indigenous languages and cultures in the education system. IBE consists of various bilingual curriculum designs meant to address the educational needs of indigenous communities.

Since the late 20th century, IBE has become an important, more or less successful instrument of governmental language planning in several Latin American countries. These include bilingual education in Mayan languages in Guatemala, Quechua in Peru, and Maya in Mexico.

== Types of education in bilingual and bi-cultural contexts ==
As language planning became more intentional due to indigenous rights movements, theorists adopted standard terminology to classify different types multilingual educational programs. Terminology from bilingual education models, such as Colin Baker's model, has been employed in IBE policy and parallels future models on intercultural bilingual education. Below are the five main types of Intercultural bilingual education.

Type of education	Learners' mother tongue	Language of instruction	Social and educational goals	Linguistic goals
Submersion	Minority language	Majority language	Assimilation	Monolingualism in dominant language
Transition	Minority language	Transition from minority language to majority language	Assimilation	Relative monolingualism in dominant language (subtractive bilingualism)
Immersion	Majority language	Bilingual, with initial importance of L2 (minority language)	Pluralism and development	Bilingualism and biliteracy
Maintenance	Minority language	Bilingual, with emphasis on L1 (minority language)	Maintenance, preservation pluralism and development	Bilingualism and biliteracy in indigenous communities
Enrichment	Minority and majority language	Bilingual, with emphasis on creating a multilingual state	Maintenance, bringing multi-linguism into all populations	Bilingualism and biliteracy at a national level

=== Linguistic input ===
Submersion models prioritize teaching in the majority language and conduct all instruction in the majority language, although the students speak a minority language as their native language. These schools prohibit or discourage students from communicating in their first language during class hours and have traditionally employed school-wide policies punishing children for speaking with one another in the minority language during the school day. Transition models, in contrast, do use the student's first language initially as a bridge to monolingual instruction, but ultimately also seek to shift the state to a monolingual and monocultural society. Proponents of these models claim that children may be stigmatized for speaking an indigenous language and that Spanish provides more upward mobility. However, educators in IBE see intercultural education as a way to challenge racism and validate indigenous identities. Children in IBE programs that encouraged multilingualism in Bolivia were found to develop a higher self-esteem on average than children in submersion programs. Submersion and transition programs are associated with the highest drop-out rates.

In contrast, immersion, enrichment and maintenance models seek to cultivate bilingual and biliterate students. Immersion and maintenance schools seek to value and teach in both indigenous and national culture, and they exhibit the highest graduation rates out of the four models. Immersion programs generally seek to strengthen the minority language in communities where it may be disappearing, whereas maintenance programs serve minority-language speakers. In a 2008 paper, cited by a POEIBE working paper, de Mejía instead groups maintenance and immersion systems together as they are not in widespread use, and excludes them from their typologies; however, there are some immersion schools in use. While theoretically immersion and maintenance schools correspond to the students' first language, in practice this distinction may not be as clear in communities that are undergoing language shift. Such communities may have both children who are bilingual before school, as well as those who speak only the majority or minority language. Mejía also distinguishes enrichment education as a distinct category of IBE in which bilingualism is sought beyond indigenous communities in the greater population.

It is important to recognize the widespread yet false belief that any minority language heritage language instruction will detract from learning and communication in majority language. Studies from the early twentieth century that purported to find an academic disadvantage for bilingual children often lacked controls for socioeconomic class and fluency during testing.

=== Intercultural aspect ===
With this observation in mind, IBE models plan not just the linguistic input in the student's education, but also the cultural input. Intercultural education presents different “systems of knowledge, civilizational patterns, cultures and languages … in complementary distribution.” Immersion, maintenance, and enrichment models promote this method of learning. Submersion and transition models intend to assimilate indigenous communities into the mainstream culture.

There are disconnects between this theoretical model and how it is implemented pedagogically and politically. For example, teachers may have been personally educated in a submersion or transition model, as these are the oldest models, and may carry these elements into immersion or maintenance education. Additionally, some researchers question whether some IBE teachers have access to training in intercultural teaching or communicative-focused L2 instruction. While many Latin American universities have designed and support certification programs, training of IBE teachers in immersion or maintenance models is an ongoing challenge, as discussed below. Beyond this disconnect between the ideal model and its implementation, IBE also assumes that children are monolingual when they enter the education system. In areas such as the Mosquito Coast, children often are acquiring multiple languages before school begins. IBE's lack of power divisions between minority languages, and focus on bilingualism when more than two languages are present, may not serve the community's needs appropriately.

== History in Latin America ==
The immense linguistic diversity in Latin America is what in part gave rise to demand for programs that would integrate indigenous languages into educational policy. Brazil, for example, has the largest number of indigenous languages in the region with approximately 180. Additionally, in some nations, the majority of speakers natively speak one or more indigenous languages that are not the prestige language.

With the rise of indigenous activism in the 1970s, and controversy about multilingualism and previous bilingual education projects, a new education model of language maintenance and development emerged. This included an embrace of cultural aspects that were not exclusively linguistic: teaching aspects of everyday life culture, traditions, and world concepts. From the beginning of the 1980s, bilingual intercultural education was being developed in Latin America.

=== Influences ===
==== Government ====
After the nation states gained independence in Latin America at the beginning of the 19th century, the elites imposed a model of unification based on the Criollo culture and Spanish or Portuguese language as used by the colonial rulers. This system reached only the privileged classes and those parts of the mestizo population speaking Spanish or Portuguese. The bilingual programs were all developed to be transitional, in order to prepare pupils for unilingual secondary and higher education in the dominant language. They contributed to a more widespread use of Spanish as common language. These were experimental projects of limited extension and duration, enabled by international aid, such as the Deutsche Gesellschaft für Technische Zusammenarbeit (GTZ) or the United States Agency for International Development (USAID).

In the 20th century, governments' attempts to educate the whole population in each country was based on a goal of assimilation. In other words, attempts to expand access to schooling to the whole population had the explicit goal of Hispanicization (castellanización) of indigenous peoples. Spanish was used as a language of instruction for learner groups, although few among more isolated indigenous communities understood it. Students did not have much success in learning, and there were high rates of class repetition or dropouts. The speakers of indigenous languages left school as illiterate and were stigmatized as uneducated indios. The use or even knowledge of an indigenous language became a social disadvantage, so many people stopped speaking these languages, but had sub-standard Spanish. Because of such language issues, for instance among indigenous peoples who moved to cities, they became uprooted, belonging fully neither to the indigenous or to the dominant culture.

Since the 1980s, many countries have passed laws recognizing linguistic and cultural rights. In countries such as Argentina, Bolivia, Brazil, Colombia, Ecuador, and Mexico, constitutional reforms were realized that recognized indigenous languages and cultures. In most Latin American countries, IBE is under control of the respective country's Ministry of Education.

In most countries, bilingual/bicultural education does not reach the majority of the indigenous population, who often live outside the major cities, or in more isolated urban communities; in addition, it is applied only in primary education. Bolivia, Colombia, Ecuador, and Mexico have passed laws directing such education of all indigenous speakers, and Paraguay intends for the entire student population to receive bilingual training.

==== NGOs ====
Many non-governmental organizations aided in the development of intercultural bilingual programs throughout Latin America with varying levels of involvement and different motives. These included the Summer Institute of Linguistics, the German Agency for Technical Cooperation (GTZ) as well as USAID and the World Bank's PEIA.

===== SIL =====
The Summer Institute of Linguistics (SIL), an evangelical institution based in Dallas, Texas, was the first institution to introduce bilingual education in Latin America for indigenous peoples. It had goals both of evangelization and aiding in the creation of intercultural bilingual programs. The first bilingual education programs of SIL started in Mexico and Guatemala in the 1930s, in Ecuador and Peru in the 1940s, and in Bolivia in 1955.

===== GTZ =====
The German Agency for Technical Cooperation (GTZ) played a key role in supporting the creation of experimental bilingual education programs both at the primary school level and at the university level in Peru and Ecuador in cohesion with local governments in the late 1970s into the 1990s. More specifically, GTZ helped in the development of these programs at the level of training for primary school teachers, which supported a bilingual project with Spanish and Quechua or Aymara. In Guatemala between 1995 and 2005, an indigenous teacher training program supported the national reform of pre-service and in-service teacher training. The Puno bilingual education project (1979-1990) was one of the most important contributions of the German Technical Cooperation Agency to the development of indigenous intercultural bilingual education in Peru and PROEIB Andes (Programa de Formnación en Educación Intercultural Bilingüe para los Países Andinos), that started in 1996 is the most important effort made in the professional development of Indigenous teachers and Ministry of Education officers of Argentina, Bolivia, Chile, Colombia, Ecuador, and Peru.

=== Argentina ===
Like in many other Latin American countries, the movement towards IBE did not gain momentum in Argentina until the 1980s and 1990s, especially considering the political environment of the country at the time. After democracy was restored in the country, there was a new initiative within the country to make ethnic minorities more visible which led to the development and implementation of IBE. According to their last census, Argentina is home to 20 indigenous groups with 14 indigenous languages. The total indigenous population, however, is a small percentage of the total population especially in comparison to surrounding countries, as it sits at less than 10%. After the overthrow of the dictatorship and the reestablishment of democracy in the country, these indigenous populations in theory should have gained more agency and representation when legislation created during this time recognized their existence within the country and outlined the rights they had as citizens of it.

The implementation of the IBE program has been portrayed as one that would combat the ethnic divisiveness the country experienced before and during the political unrest of the 1970s. It was presented as a method and education policy that would do away with stereotypes and help appreciate and tend to the sociocultural diversity of the nation. However, the placement of IBE under the supervision of the National Office of Compensatory Programs at the Department of Equity and Quality, and not under the Ministry of Education in 2004, gave the impression to some that these education policies were not seen as important to core instruction for the nations which undermines the struggles that indigenous populations have experienced in attaining educational policies that are tailored to their needs. In 2007, IBE was reassigned to the National Office of Curricular Management and Teacher Training at the Ministry of Education, which for many within the country is promising to the future of IBE although there is yet to be any data that would support any claims of improvement. Further concerns arose about education, especially from those in IBE when there was a decentralization of education in the nation, meaning provinces now help control the education sector. However, for many this only widened the education and achievement gap because federal spending decreased across the board and funding came from the individual province. This meant that IBE schools and programs received much less funding overall because they tended to be situated in less economically powerful provinces given that the indigenous populations of Argentina are among the poorest in the nation.

Argentina has also encountered the problem of providing sufficient education and levels of education consistent with the IBE method. The Argentinian education system is structured with four levels: preschool, elementary, high school, and higher education. Among those levels it also offers categories under which a student can study. For example, students can choose artistic education, rural education, special education and IBE along with other options. However, there are fewer and fewer options and opportunities for those on the IBE path as the levels progress with no official source of higher education within the IBE category.

=== Bolivia ===
A goal of the National Revolution in Bolivia in 1952 was to end discrimination of the indigenous people by integrating them into the majority society. Education in schools was emphasized, to be adapted to the linguistic situation. The government of Víctor Paz Estenssoro assigned education and Hispanization in the eastern lowlands to the SIL, granting them at the same time the right to evangelize. Instruction in the first two grades of primary school took place in the indigenous languages to facilitate acquisition by students of Spanish. By the beginning of secondary school, the only language of instruction was Spanish.

In the early 21st century, Bolivia and some other countries have begun to promote a two-way IBE for the whole population. Under such proposals, all Spanish-speaking pupils and students are to learn at least one indigenous language.

=== Chile ===
Compared to other countries in the region, the indigenous population in Chile is relatively small. This leads to different obstacles when establishing an IBE model in the country. IBE became a significant model in the educational policies since Law 19.253 was passed in 1993 and established IBE in Chile.

Due to the small populations and the low number of qualified teachers to implement the IBE model, Chile has had some difficulties in establishing a successful long term program equipped with not only enough teachers but also enough students. For example, the Mapuche people of Chile now exist as a mostly urban population. Although this could provide better opportunities for education, this does not mean that the education they receive is tailored to their cultural or linguistic needs. This is also problematic considering that the majority of schools were commissioned in rural areas.

=== Ecuador ===
The system of IBE in Ecuador was more of a 'bottom-up' approach in that it was initiated by indigenous persons. Unlike in many other countries, IBE in Ecuador has been administered by indigenous organizations that are members of ECUARUNARI and CONAIE since 1988. This followed an agreement between the government and the indigenous movement, leading to the establishment of the national IBE directorate DINEIB (Dirección Nacional de Educacion Intercultural Bilingue). Indigenous representatives appointed teachers and school directors, designed curricula, and wrote textbooks.

=== Guatemala ===
Guatemala has one of the most extensive systems of intercultural bilingual education with one of the highest percentages of indigenous peoples in Latin America at 39.9% and a very high level of monolingualism among the indigenous population. Intercultural bilingual education in Guatemala is specifically mandated for regions with high numbers of indigenous peoples.

=== Mexico ===
Since the Mexican Revolution in the early 1900s, strong nationalist movements have enveloped the country until the late 1980s and early 1990s when the indigenous communities of Mexico received more recognition; amendments to the constitution stated that these communities had the right to learn and maintain their language and culture through education. Large indigenous communities in the Yucatán Peninsula and in the state of Chiapas were the first to begin implementing an IBE model during this time period.

The General Directorate for Education of the Indigenous (DGEI) in Mexico was created in 1973, scheduling the use of 56 officially recognized indigenous languages. The Federal Education Law of 1973 ascertained that instruction in Spanish must not take place at the cost of cultural and linguistic identity of indigenous Spanish-learners. Throughout the 1970s, there was a shift from merely bilingual educational programs to intercultural bilingual programs. Additionally the government pushed that all children, not just indigenous children, needed to participate in interculturalism. In this case, the demand for an IBE program came mostly from the government rather than large scale demand by indigenous persons. IBE programs focused on creating biliteracy and bilingualism in indigenous languages and Spanish. These programs extend beyond basic education and are now leading to the creation of bilingual/bicultural universities in Mexico.

=== Peru ===
The first education programs without the explicit goal of Hispanisation were developed in the 1960s, among them a pilot program of the Universidad Nacional Mayor de San Marcos in a Quechua-speaking area in the Quinua District of the Ayacucho Region. The pilot encouraged the government of General Juan Velasco Alvarado to include bilingual education in its educational reform in 1972. In 1975, Peru was the first country of the Americas to declare an indigenous language, Quechua, as an official language. Quechua was introduced in schools as a second language in Lima, but prejudices meant that few ethnic European or mestizo students studied it. Little changed for the Quechua and Aymara speakers in the Andes, as Velasco was overthrown in 1975.

Other relevant intercultural bilingual education projects were carried out in Alto-Napo with Amazonian Kichwa population, in Cuzco with Quechua students (1975-1980), and in Puno (1979-1990) with Aymara and Quechua students. As of the early 1990s, various national NGOs, with international financial support, assumed intercultural bilingual education as one of their main activities particularly in the Andean Southern region between Ayacucho and Puno.

As a result of intervention by the Peruvian Ombudsman (Defensoría del Pueblo), which in 2010 published a report on the situation of the education of Indigenous populations, the Ministry of Education starting in 2011 reinforced the application of IBE in Peru and significantly increased the national budget, trained teachers, produced educational materials and implemented a national teachers' mentoring system to secure the adequate implementation of EIB in over 20.000 schools in the Amazonian Basin and the Andes.

On the other hand, the Peruvian indigenous teachers’ association Asociación Nacional de Maestros de Educación Bilingüe Intercultural criticizes the implementation of IBE in Peru as a bridge to Hispanicization and monoculturalization. It has said that the education of indigenous people should be under their own control and that of their communities.

==== AIDESEP/ISPL Program ====
In the early 1980s, AIDESEP, an indigenous rights group in Peru, collaborated with ISPL and the University of Iquitos to create a research project related to creating a model for intercultural bilingual education. The program had two primary concerns: improving mastery of Spanish for those who spoke other languages at home, and to revitalize what they viewed as a loss of indigenous knowledge due to the prestige placed on "white people's knowledge". They faced many challenges such as internalized views of prestige of native culture and language by the children themselves as well as the typical challenges of bilingual education such as language domains.

== Other similar models ==
Colonization that gives rise to systems of language inequality is not exclusive to Latin America; various other areas around the world have attempted to implement similar programs to the IBE model. These programs allow non-prestige languages to be taught in the school system alongside a majority language. These programs did not reach the scope of implementation that IBE did in Latin America.

=== North America ===
In the United States and Canada, there are an estimated 184 living indigenous languages. However, only 20 of these 184 are currently learned in a naturalistic environment (through immersion with family and community) by children. Many of these minority languages are part of the various Native American tribes which, through the history of reservation creation and racism by the dominant society, have come close to extinction. Similarly to the case with the Hispanicization of Latin America, the prevailing idea that English is a prestige language associated with opportunity and literacy led to an ambivalence towards sustaining various tribal languages, despite the important role they play in tribal community and ethnic identity.

==== Hualapai ====
One attempt to integrate non-prestige culture and language into education systems can be found in the Hualapai Bilingual Academic Excellence Program (HBAEP) in Peach Springs, Arizona. The Hualapai tribe lives in northwestern Arizona and their language, Hualapai, was an oral language with no formal writing system prior to the creation of the bilingual school program in 1975. The school was founded by Lucille Watahomigie who was herself Hualapai. The goals of the program were to create biliteracy in both Hualapai and English as well as encourage equality for the indigenous language and teach cultural tribal history in addition to typical American English curriculum. The creation of a phonetic-based writing system proved to be a challenge but resulted in a successful biliteracy program and helped the children to acquire English reading proficiency as well.

==== Navajo ====
The Navajo language has the most speakers of any indigenous language in the U.S. The Rock Point Community School was created in an attempt to improve student achievement among the Navajo people in Rock Point, New Mexico as well as improve self-image of individuals who did not speak the prestige language. Navajo is the primary language spoken by the majority of people in this area, and children's low English proficiency resulted in low reading and math scores. In the late 1960s and early 1970s there was a bilingual-bicultural program created for kindergarten through 6th grade. The classroom time was jointly taught in English and Navajo, with a heavier dependence on Navajo in the earlier years. Despite this program, fewer and fewer children enter kindergarten fluent in Navajo each year, which may suggest the need for future programs.

==== Hawai'i ====
After the annexation of Hawai'i by the United States in 1898, the government banned the use of the Hawaiian language in education. Prior to this ban, Hawaiian was the medium for public education. By the 1980s, there were only around 50 Hawaiian speakers outside of Ni'ihau, and in 1983 Hawaiians started the first Pūnana Leo language nest immersion preschool. In 1986, the ban on the Hawaiian language in schools was lifted, and in 1987 the first immersion school began in the islands. Similar to IBE, there is an emphasis on training immersion teachers not just as educators, but as mauli ola Hawai'i or teachers of Hawaiian identity. Today, the University of Hawai'i at Hilo supports various post-graduate studies in Hawaiian language, literature, teaching and language revitalization, and students can publish their dissertations in Hawaiian in some circumstances. The 2010 U.S. Census reports that there are 24,000 speakers of Hawaiian, and research suggests that Hawaiian immersion programs are growing.

== Intercultural Bilingual Education in Latin America: Political Debates and Criticisms by Countries ==
In this section of the article, four specific case studies will be described and the political debates turning around them will be presented. The four case studies will constitute four countries: Nicaragua, Peru, Ecuador, and Chile. For each of these countries, only one source by one specific author will be used. Although the implementation of one author only may seem biased, it is important to remember that the purpose of this article is to simply provide a general introduction to Intercultural Bilingual Education as an educational model and political movement with a special emphasis in Latin America.

=== IBE and Political Debates in Nicaragua ===
One of the main debates around Intercultural Bilingual Education (IBE) is that multilingual, inter-ethnic societies challenge the western ideology stating that societies are “internally homogeneous” entities that have sharp divisions between each other based on linguistic and cultural markers. Since the IBE model in Nicaragua was largely designed on this ideology, its design and implementation by the Nicaraguan state (and NGOs) does not accommodate communities that are “mother tongue bi-multilingual”, for it constrains people living in inter-ethnic multilingual societies to choose a limited set of cultural and linguistic-identity markers.

==== Criticisms of IBE as implemented in the Caribbean Coast of Nicaragua ====
Freeland (2003) explains that the IBE program in Nicaragua constitutes a remarkable improvement in contrast to the cruel assimilationist Spanish-monolingual schooling model applied to indigenous populations. It also has enhanced the gain of prestige of Coastal minority languages (Miskitu, Sumu/Mayangna, English Creole: Garifuna, Rama) through educational programs and production of educational material and research in these languages.

Nonetheless, Freeland also points to significant flaws in the IBE program in Nicaragua. The first flaw is that the program applies a “one-size-fits-all” policy, which ignores social dynamics based on the co-existence of different ethnic groups in a single community and their use of two or more languages as mother tongues. Furthermore, it produces various inequalities regarding the fulfillment of language rights by different groups: some of them are able to achieve their rights through the program but many others are not. In addition, the IBE program in Nicaragua is largely based on an early-transitional model designed for a facilitated transition into a monolingual Spanish environment and less focused in the long-term maintenance of individuals’ mother tongues.

==== Conclusion on IBE in the Caribbean Coast of Nicaragua ====
Freeland concludes in her ethnography that the IBE programs implemented in the various communities of the Nicaraguan Caribbean coast are effective as long as the people whom they serve have agency over these and can achieve whatever linguistic and cultural goals they desire (2003, 254). The moment the IBE, whether directed by the state or an NGO, is imposed on a community by disregarding their goals, it becomes objectified. In this sense, the members of the communities are rather seen as objects that serve as a means to a fixed, constraining end and not as individuals with collective and individual aspirations hoping to get the best out of IBE programs.

=== IBE and Political Debates in the Amazonian Low Basin of Peru ===
Lucy Trapnell (2003), a linguistic anthropologist and co-designer of the IBE program in the Peruvian Amazonian Low Basin in conjunction with AIDESEP (Inter-ethnic Association for the Development of the Peruvian Rainforest or Asociación Interétnica de Desarrollo de la Selva Peruana in Spanish), explains that this program promotes the inclusion of indigenous knowledge in schools, languages and cosmovisions, and at the same time it incorporates indigenous realities of perceiving the world. Therefore, the AIDESEP IBE program opts to focus on the aspect of self-determination of indigenous peoples about their identity. On this basis, self-determination is based on “cultural heritage”, and it allows people to have agency over the shaping of their communities instead of clinging to a romanticized past. By the same token, Trapnell argues that the AIDESEP IBE program avoids falling into the “Myth of the Noble Savage” fallacy, which portrays indigenous cultures as pristine, static, and isolated, by treating “cultural heritage” as a socio-historic aspect and by providing a greater importance to society over culture.

==== Criticisms in AIDESEP IBE implementation in the Peruvian Amazonian Low Basin ====
Trapnell argues that, unlike the Peruvian national curriculum, AIDESEP recognizes the importance of addressing the pervasive assimilationist agenda of national education towards indigenous peoples. By training community teachers to be culturally sensitive and have more effective pedagogical methods, AIDESEP empowers the incorporation of indigenous knowledges in communities’ schools. Furthermore, one of the most relevant aspects of the AIDESEP project is that it serves not only as an IBE program but also as a political platform through which indigenous peoples of Peru voice their claims of rights to their lands, culture, and sovereignty.

Nonetheless, negative outcomes are also reported in Trapnell's study based on the opinions of the students and faculty participating in the program. Students report having spent an excessive part of their training (70%) in the theoretical reconstructing of past ideal societies but reported that they did not have sufficient ethnographic skills to understand the present reality of their own communities. By the same token, there is a disproportionate focus on the socio-historic past of indigenous communities, something about which students in the program complained. Ironically, their complaints were dismissed as “self-rejection” of students’ own past.

Another present criticism that Trapnell emphasizes about traditional IBE programs in Latin America is that such programs may focus excessively on cultural aspects of a society based on tradition. Too often, this approach runs the risk of objectifying and commodifying culture and language revitalization efforts. Furthermore, it ultimately leads to a static, romanticized view of indigenous societies that strongly contrasts with the realities indigenous peoples currently live. At the end of the AIDESEP IBE program, another negative outcome was an ethnocentrism towards other indigenous peoples by several students based on the preservation and performance of specific cultural traits—on the basis of these cultural traits, they created categories of “real indigenous peoples” as opposition to more “urbanized” peoples.

=== IBE in Ecuador: The Political Arena and Organizations ===
Indigenous organizations like CONAIE (Confederation of Indigenous Nations of Ecuador or Confederación de Naciones Indígenas del Ecuador in Spanish) and indigenous political figures have greatly pressed for the recognition and enforcement of indigenous language rights in Ecuador by framing these rights’ legitimacy through the category of “collective” or group rights. For instance, the right of indigenous peoples to speak their languages in public and official acts and their use of public services in their languages have been promoted. CONAIE created an “administrative structure” that served as an extension whose responsibility involved the production of teaching material in Indigenous languages of Ecuador (as well as their standardization), bilingual-teacher training, and implementation of IBE programs throughout the country. This structure is the DINEIIB (National Directorate of Bilingual Indigenous Intercultural Education or Dirección Nacional de Educación Indígena Intercultural Bilingüe in Spanish).

==== Standardization of Kichwa in Ecuador: sociolinguistic consequences ====
The production of a standardized version of Kichwa (Unified Kichwa or Kichwa unificado in Spanish) has been an essential component and one of the most important achievements of the IBE program directed by DINEIIB in Ecuador. Kichwa is the indigenous language with the largest number of speakers in Ecuador and has several regional dialects in the Andean highlands and the Amazonian Lowlands of the country. The phonological features of many dialects were simplified and unified under the standardized version of the language, which contained several neologisms that replaced loanwords from Spanish. Despite the implementation of Unified Kichwa by indigenous intellectuals and children at schools, there are ethnolinguistic differences between speakers of the standard dialect and those who speak more traditional dialects of Kichwa, especially elders in the community and people from rural areas. These linguistic differences in both spoken Kichwa versions have provoked internal divisions among community members of different generations and social classes. These divisions have rapidly led to conflict and sociolinguistic intolerance between groups of people within the Kichwa-speaking communities.

==== Criticisms in the implementation of IBE by the state in Ecuador ====
Despite the significant advances in indigenous education that have been made in Ecuador since the twentieth century, Haboud and King point to three essential flaws that have not allowed for IBE in Ecuador to fulfill its realization. The first hindrance of IBE in Ecuador is the lack of trained and qualified educators for indigenous languages. There are simply not enough qualified teachers in the country to impart an effective education in the academic curriculum. The second criticism stems from an unclear “definition” of what IBE entails as a bilingual model regarding the degree to which indigenous languages and Spanish are to be taught in schools. In that sense, there is an inconsistent use of the term “intercultural” as an ideology that wishes to be inclusive for all ethnicities in the country but that, in reality, is largely limited to indigenous peoples only. Non-indigenous people barely, if ever, learn indigenous languages or enroll in IBE schools and thus cannot appreciate the components of the IBE program. Finally, there are heavy cuts in spending in social welfare sectors, including education and health. These social welfare cuts are very frequent and are more intense in Latin American countries like Ecuador.

=== IBE in Chile: Incorporation of Mapuche traditional Teachers ===
Ortiz (2009) investigated the role that ancestral teachers of Mapuche indigenous knowledge known as Kimches played in the functioning of IBE schools in the rural community of Piedra Alta, located in the Area de Desarrollo Indigena (Area of Indigenous Development in Spanish or ADI) in Araucania, Southern Chile. He argues that the incorporation of Kimches in Intercultural Bilingual schools like Piedra Alta constitute a decolonizing methodology and “an act of epistemological resistance” (Ortiz 2009, 95). In that sense, the incorporation of Kimches is a methodology to revitalize and legitimize Mapuche culture and Mapudungun (Mapuche's language) in response to the pervasive “Eurocentric modern” pedagogy implemented by the Chilean state in order to create a national identity based on assimilation of indigenous peoples.

==== Challenges faced by IBE schools' incorporation of Kimches in rural Mapuche communities ====
Ortiz reports that in rural communities like Piedra Alta, IBE schools have incorporated traditional Mapuche teachers known as Kimches, who impart indigenous knowledge in the classrooms to their students through oral teachings and written texts. Kimches also act as intermediaries between Mapuche parents and non-indigenous or non-Mapuche faculty and staff at the schools and are usually respected and active members in their communities. Unfortunately, Kimches have also been the subject of criticism by some parents of the Mapuche community, who see them as unfit to teach in formal schools in comparison to mainstream teachers. The teaching content of Kimches has also been criticized by some Mapuche parents opposing IBE by saying that this type of indigenous knowledge is of no use in mainstream Chilean society and that they rather prefer their children to learn indigenous knowledge at home. Kimche teachers also face challenges when they try to impart indigenous knowledge in Mapudungun to their students because many of their Mapuche students simply do not understand the language well enough to be engaged in class. Therefore, the teachers are forced to code-switch between Spanish and Mapudungun. However, there is a clear dominance of Spanish both in the classroom and the community and family meetings where Ortiz's ethnography took place.

According to Ortiz, there is “a generational breakdown in the transmission of indigenous culture and language” among many younger generations in rural regions, which is a main cause of Mapuche youngsters not learning or knowing Mapudungun and other cultural aspects (Ortiz 2009, 110). On the other hand, there has been a pervasive influence of mainstream Chilean and global culture in the form of technology, thus inviting Mapuche youth to move towards a more assimilated Chilean but also global identity.

==== Criticisms in the implementation of IBE by the state in Chile ====
Despite the prevalence of IBE schools in rural areas of Chile, Ortiz reported no IBE programs in Santiago, Chile's capital and home city of approximately fifty percent of the total Mapuche population. In the rural areas, the implementation of IBE programs is not consistent and heavily depends on the intervention of the Chilean State and the Catholic Church, which manage the resource allocation for these schools. However, there is a considerable inequality of resource allocation for IBE indigenous schools. The latter dependence of IBE schools on the Chilean State and Church is further exemplified on the limited intercultural bilingual education these entities provide to the indigenous populations it serves at the grade level. Indigenous schools are limited to the elementary school level, which means these schools are only able to offer education until the eighth grade. As a consequence, indigenous students are forced to look for schooling outside their communities, mostly in urban centers, where schools are Hispanicized and where mainstream Chilean education is imparted.

In the rural areas, the positive benefits that IBE may have for the Mapuche people are not acknowledged among various factions of the communities. One of the most present criticisms presented by Ortiz is that many Mapuche parents do not consider IBE to be an adequate program for their children in the sense that it does not equip students with the sufficient, necessary tools for them to obtain social upward mobility in mainstream Chilean society. Furthermore, this social upward mobility is mainly conceived as getting better-paying jobs and superior education in universities.

==== Current political debates on the relevance and role of IBE in Chile for the Mapuche ====
Ortiz argues that, currently, Mapuche IBE is seen as a part of a series of socio-political rights that Mapuche leaders claim regarding land rights and sovereignty. It is not seen as an independent enterprise in which considerable resources and attention should be invested in. By the same token, he also argues that there is a dissonance of agendas regarding IBE for indigenous peoples in Chile and other countries and the national Latin American states, a dissonance he calls “the assimilationist/pluralist paradox” (Ortiz 2009, 99). This paradox is a political debate in which indigenous leaders and activists expect to use IBE as a political platform in which they are able to launch their claims for land and sovereignty. Contrary to the “indigenist” agenda, Latin American states, such as Chile, aim to use IBE as a tool of assimilation for indigenous people into a single national identity. Ortiz concludes that IBE programs do not have the unanimous support of Mapuche communities. He argues that there needs to be a greater attention and autonomy given to IBE programs in Mapuche communities by Mapuche leaders. That is, IBE should stand on its own rather than being a complement of wider, complex political debates such as land rights and political sovereignty.

==== Cross-comparison between Chile and other Latin American countries regarding IBE implementation ====
It is important to take into account that, unlike countries like Ecuador, Bolivia, and Peru, whose indigenous populations are substantially large, Chile's indigenous peoples only constitute a little more than four percent of the total population in Chile. The fact that indigenous population in Chile is so small implies that IBE has not been implemented in the same ways as in other Latin American countries, where the large indigenous populations have demanded IBE as a political platform for their rights. In addition, the Mapuche people, the largest indigenous nation in Chile, has heavily migrated to urban centers and it has been reported that only twenty percent of Mapuche still live in rural areas. The remaining eighty percent have migrated to five main urban centers, Santiago being the home of most of the Mapuche urban population.

== Bibliography ==
- Colin Baker (2006): Foundations of bilingual education and bilingualism. Multilingual Matters, Clevedon, (England). 4th ed.
- Luis Enrique López (2006): De resquicios a boquerones. La educación intercultural bilingüe en Bolivia, Plural Editores & PROEIB Andes, La Paz (in Spanish), Online PDF, 8 MB
