= Aguacatán =

- Municipality
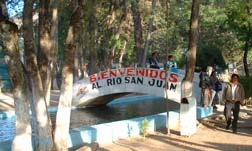
- Walkway over Rio San Juan, near the "Nacimiento"

- Location in Guatemala
- Coordinates: 15°20′26″N 91°18′50″W
- Country: Guatemala
- Department: Huehuetenango
- Municipality: Aguacatán

Government
  - Type: Municipal
  - Mayor (2012-2020): Selvin Omar Villatoro RecinosVacant (LIDER)

Area
  - Municipality: 287 km^{2} (111 sq mi)
- Elevation: 1,670 m (5,480 ft)
- Highest elevation: 3,200 m (10,500 ft)
- Lowest elevation: 1,350 m (4,430 ft)

Population (Census 2018)
  - Municipality: 49,607
  - Density: 173/km^{2} (448/sq mi)
  - Urban: 8,084
  - Ethnicities: Awakatek Mam Kʼicheʼ Chalchitek Ladino
  - Religions: Roman Catholicism Evangelicalism Maya
- Climate: Cwb
- Website: http://www.inforpressca.com/aguacatan/

Aguacatán (Spanish pronunciation: [aɣwakaˈtan]) is a town and municipality in the Guatemalan department of Huehuetenango. It is situated at 1,670 metres (5,480 ft) above sea level. The municipality has a population of 49,607 (2018 census) and covers an area of 287 km^{2}.

== Geography ==
Aguacatán is located in a mountainous area, with farmland beginning approximately six blocks from the central market.

Aguacatán was served primarily by dirt roads cutting through the mountains. The dirt road suffered from erosion, potholes and landslides. The paving of the roads to Huehuetenango and Sacapulas and Nebaj was completed in 2006. It now links Aguacatán to the Pan American Highway (near Huehuetenango), and to markets and opportunities for economic growth.

The Nacimiento del Rio San Juan is a natural spring where water pours up out of a small pool. The pool is surrounded by pipes that tap into the water supply. Irrigation from the spring explains the prolific agriculture in the area. The Nacimiento has a park with benches and a two-story observation area.

== Demographics ==
Aguacatán is the only municipality in the world in which Awakateko is the native language. In outlying areas, even just a walk uphill to Aldea San Miguel or up the mountain road to Chex, the native language is Kʼicheʼ. Awakateko is spoken in some other aldeas, including Llano Coyote, near Rio San Juan. Awakateko and Kʼicheʼ are both Mayan languages. Other languages spoken in the municipality are Mam and Chalchitek. Spanish is also spoken by most residents.

Principal religions are Roman Catholic and Evangelicalism.

== Economy ==
A central market is open most days. Bus service connects Aguacatán to Huehuetenango and other cities. Internet and telephone services are available.

Poor economic conditions have prompted some residents to travel for work to other parts of Guatemala, and also to Mexico and the United States. Some have settled in Tuscarawas County, Ohio.

== History ==
Aguacatán suffered much violence during the Civil War, especially in the early 1980s. The aldea of Chex was attacked, and is now five sub-communities.

In the elections of December 30, 2003, 11 candidates challenged the incumbent mayor. The election results were disputed, a rally of most residents called for a new election, and the mayor closed city offices and operations for months.

== Climate ==
Aguacatán has a subtropical highland climate (Köppen: Cwb).

Climate data for Aguacatán
Month	Jan	Feb	Mar	Apr	May	Jun	Jul	Aug	Sep	Oct	Nov	Dec	Year
Mean daily maximum °C (°F)	23.6 (74.5)	24.6 (76.3)	26.5 (79.7)	26.8 (80.2)	26.3 (79.3)	25.0 (77.0)	24.7 (76.5)	25.0 (77.0)	24.7 (76.5)	24.0 (75.2)	24.0 (75.2)	23.6 (74.5)	24.9 (76.8)
Daily mean °C (°F)	17.0 (62.6)	17.6 (63.7)	19.3 (66.7)	19.8 (67.6)	19.9 (67.8)	19.6 (67.3)	19.1 (66.4)	19.0 (66.2)	19.0 (66.2)	18.5 (65.3)	17.9 (64.2)	17.3 (63.1)	18.7 (65.6)
Mean daily minimum °C (°F)	10.5 (50.9)	10.7 (51.3)	12.1 (53.8)	12.9 (55.2)	13.6 (56.5)	14.2 (57.6)	13.5 (56.3)	13.1 (55.6)	13.3 (55.9)	13.1 (55.6)	11.8 (53.2)	11.1 (52.0)	12.5 (54.5)
Average precipitation mm (inches)	35 (1.4)	29 (1.1)	40 (1.6)	63 (2.5)	147 (5.8)	353 (13.9)	263 (10.4)	225 (8.9)	316 (12.4)	243 (9.6)	98 (3.9)	46 (1.8)	1,858 (73.3)
Source: Climate-Data.org
