= Santo Domingo Kesté =

- Urban Locality
- Location within Mexico
- Coordinates: 19°29′59″N 90°30′41″W

Area
  - Land: 1,756 km^{2} (678 sq mi)

Population (2020)
  - Total: 4,461

Santo Domingo Kesté is a town in Campeche, Mexico in the Champotón Municipality. In 2010, Santo Domingo Kesté had 3,763 people, and in 2020 Santo Domingo Kesté had a population of 4,461. Santo Domingo Kesté is home to Telesecundaria 87. There is an Awakatek community in Santo Domingo Kesté, and they speak the Qʼeqchiʼ language. Chihua pumpkins, peanuts, common beans, sesame seeds, sweet potatoes, maize, cassava, and hibiscus are grown in Santo Domingo Kesté, with chihua pumpkins being the most important crop economically.

== History ==
This town was established by Guatemalan refugees escaping the conflict in their country during the 1980s. They journeyed through the Guatemalan rainforest and crossed into Mexico, eventually arriving in Chiapas. Later, the Mexican government relocated these refugees to various locations within Campeche. A group originating from Huehuetenango and Quiché in Guatemala chose to settle in a location they named Santo Domingo Kesté.

In 2018, the National Institute of Indigenous Peoples held the first Meeting of Cultural Groups of Guatemalan Origin in Santo Domingo Kesté, in which four hundred people participated from nearby ejidos, as well as a delegation from Guatemala.
