= Intercultural bilingual education in Guatemala =

Education program for speakers of indigenous languages

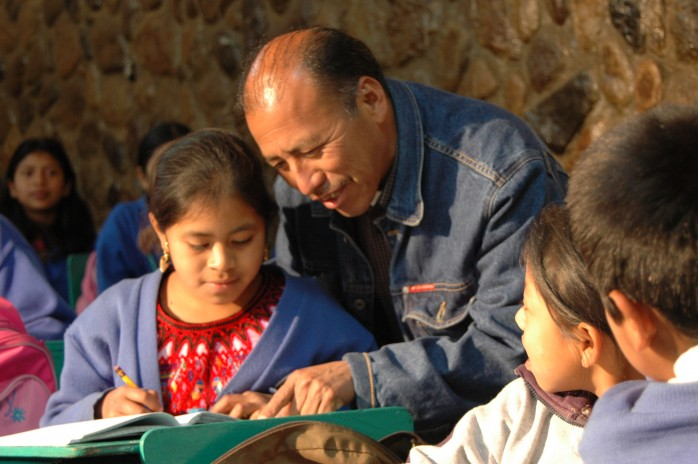
A teacher works with a Kʼicheʼ student at her school in Santa Cruz del Quiché, Quiché, Guatemala.

Intercultural bilingual education in Guatemala was begun as part of a 20th-century educational reform effort intended to promote the country's cultural diversity. The programs merge Mayan language and culture with Spanish language and Ladino culture, a shift from the assimilation policy of educational programs promoting Spanish literacy which reduce the use of indigenous languages. During the 20th century, education reform evolved from castilianization and the 1965 Bilingual Castilianization Program to the 1980 National Bilingual Education Project. Each program aimed to increase Spanish fluency. In 1985, the Constitution legalized bilingual education and the Ministry of Education formed the Programa Nacional de Educación Bilingüe (PRONEBI). PRONEBI developed from the 1980–1984 National Bilingual Education Project, and aimed to provide bilingual education for rural indigenous children.

PRONEBI differed from previous education programs in recognizing the value of Mayan culture and language in Guatemala's multicultural and multilingual society, and has played a major role in institutionalizing intercultural bilingual education. In 2005 there were bilingual programs in Qʼeqchiʼ, Achiʼ, Kaqchikel, Chʼortiʼ, Poqomam, Mam, Qʼanjobʼal, Garifuna, Mopán, Kʼicheʼ, Tzʼutujil and Xinka, and the Ministry of Education's Strategic Plan for Education 2012–2016 has made bilingual, intercultural education a national priority. Intercultural bilingual education programs in Guatemala have received criticism and support from Mayan activists, indigenous communities and international scholars and activists.

== Contexts ==
=== Ethnolinguistic context ===
Guatemala was described as a multi-ethnic, multicultural and multilingual country in the Constitution of 1985, which recognizes the right to cultural identity (Article 58) and says that bilingual instruction is preferable in regions with large indigenous populations. Guatemalans identify as mestizo, European and Mayan; its population is 59 percent mestizo and European and 40 percent Mayan. Spanish is the official language of Guatemala, with 60 percent of the population speaking the language. Speakers of Amerindian languages constitute 40 percent of the population, and the government officially recognizes 23 Amerindian languages. Education policy distinguishes between Mayan and Ladino education, but does not address the education of the Xinca (whose languages are nearly extinct) or the Garífuna (who speak Garífuna). Guatemala is one of a number of Latin American countries (including Bolivia, Ecuador, Peru, Nicaragua and Mexico) whose governments have implemented intercultural, bilingual education reform.

In Guatemala, Spanish and the Mayan languages are tied to ethnic and cultural identity and rooted historically in colonization and nation-building. During the 1940s, Mayan cultural and linguistic diversity was regarded as an "Indian problem"; bilingual education programs sought to educate native Mayan-language speakers in their first language to facilitate future Spanish literacy. Central to these bilingual education programs was the objective of eventually transitioning Mayan-language speakers to Spanish.

=== Political context ===
The development and institutionalization of intercultural bilingual education programs coincided with the 36-year Guatemalan Civil War. The peace accords, signed in December 1996, ended the war which had displaced the Mayan population. The 1996 peace accords were in part the country's renewed commitment to sustaining Mayan culture, and the revitalization of the Mayan language was centrally to the new political and cultural discourse. One of the five sets of peace accords, "The Accords on the Identity and Rights of the Indigenous Peoples", devotes one of its three sections to Mayan rights. Signed on March 31, 1995, this agreement divides Mayan rights into "Cultural Rights" and "Civil, Political, Social and Economic Rights". In "Cultural Rights", language is included in the broader concept of culture. This section enumerates measures which would elevate the status of Mayan languages, with bilingual education listed as a means of giving the Mayan languages a status equal to Spanish. The seven measures to encourage Mayan-language use as a cultural right are "constitutional recognition; bilingual education and Mayan language education; the use of Mayan languages in government services in Mayan communities; informing the indigenous peoples of their rights; training bilingual judges and interpreters; fostering appreciation of indigenous languages; and promoting the officialization of indigenous languages." The peace accords mandate bilingual education, diverging from early attempts at indigenous assimilation into a dominant society by explicitly promoting Mayan-language education.

=== Educational disparity ===
Factors related to geographical location, ethnicity, and gender create great disparity in the educational opportunities available to Guatemalan children and their academic success. Statistics suggest that where schoolchildren live may partially determine their economic opportunities, since rural illiteracy rates are much higher than those in cities. Although 40 percent of the population identifies as indigenous, only 50 percent of indigenous children are enrolled in school; two-thirds of non-indigenous children are enrolled. Among adults, the average educational level of an indigenous worker is 1.6 years; a non-indigenous worker averages five years of schooling. Within the indigenous population, educational levels of men and women vary greatly: half the indigenous men, and three-quarters of the indigenous women, have no formal education. Indigenous men have transitioned more easily to bilingualism than indigenous women.

== Early bilingual education programs ==
=== Castilianization ===
After Guatemala became independent in 1821, its government adopted a policy of assimilation for the country's indigenous peoples. The national language was Spanish, and the government proposed teaching Spanish to the indigenous population to develop national unity. Although limited resources and the inaccessibility of rural areas made it impossible to fully enforce this policy, the government maintained its policy of castilianization until the mid-20th century. Castilianization was introduced as a formal program in rural areas before 1940, educating students in a pre-primary grade (itself known as "Castilianization") and first grade. Castilianization was intended as a preparatory year in which oral Spanish would be taught and indigenous children could acclimate to a formal school environment.

=== Bilingual Castilianization Program (1965) ===
The Bilingual Castilianization Program was intended to address issues of bilingual education which were not resolved through castilianization, particularly the limited Spanish proficiency of indigenous children. The development of the program coincided with the Constitution of 1966 (which made Spanish the national language) and the Education Law, which required Spanish as the language of instruction and allowed indigenous-language use only to further Spanish literacy. The Bilingual Castilianization Program capitalized on this clause, beginning school for Mayan children one year early to improve literacy in the mother language and provide simultaneous instruction in Spanish. Instead of employing teachers, the program enlisted bilingual "promoters" who taught children part-time as a portion of their community-service time teaching adult-literacy classes. Language lessons included individual and group recitation of Spanish texts and the copying of Mayan language and Spanish texts. The program, which originally served Ixil speakers, later extended to rural communities of Guatemala's four major indigenous languages: Kʼicheʼ, Kaqchikel, Qʼeqchiʼ, and Mam.

The program was designed to assimilate and acculturate Mayan children, but logistical problems arose related to the language abilities and dialects of the bilingual promoters. Some bilingual promoters spoke a dialect which was unintelligible to their students, and they resorted to Spanish. Others believed that students needed as much access to Spanish as possible, and used the language in the classroom before the scheduled time. The program was opposed by parents, who said that their children were sent to school to learn Spanish. The Bilingual Castilianization Program provided bilingual promoters and resources to only 20 percent of eligible children. Evaluations indicated improved academic performance of indigenous students as a result of the program, but their Spanish skills were insufficient for success in monolingual Spanish schools.

=== National Bilingual Education Project (1980-1984) ===
The National Bilingual Education Project was a pilot program testing the effectiveness of an extended bilingual education program in primary schools. The United States Agency for International Development (USAID), which had been working with the government of Guatemala since 1979, provided some funding for the project. The project cost over $3 million; a USAID grant covered two-thirds of the cost, and the Guatemalan government covered the remaining third. For the pre-primary year of castilianization through the second grade, the project provided materials for all academic subjects in Kʼicheʼ, Kaqchikel, Qʼeqchiʼ, and Mam. There were ten pilot schools for each of the four languages. The pilot schools, chosen at random, were matched with control schools so the project could be assessed. Pilot-school evaluations indicated higher scores in academic subjects, higher promotion rates and lower dropout rates.

== National Bilingual Education Program (1985) ==
In 1984, the National Bilingual Education Program (PRONEBI) was established by the Ministry of Education with Government Accord No. 1093-84. In cooperation with the Ministry of Education Directorate of Rural Social Education, PRONEBI has improved intercultural bilingual programs. International funding has enabled it to develop educational programs and supply schools with resources, such as bilingual textbooks and trained bilingual teachers. For its first five years, PRONEBI was financed by a loan of $10.2 million and a grant of $3.3 million from USAID and $25 million from the Guatemalan government. Although implementation of the bilingual education programs varies by region and the availability of resources, PRONEBI's education model provides parallel instruction in Spanish and a Mayan language from the pre-primary level through fourth grade. PRONEBI has faced obstacles, including the cost of bilingual resources for classrooms, a lack of bilingual teachers and linguistic variation among the Mayan languages and their dialects.

According to PRONEBI, language is central to cultural identity. Its mission is "to strengthen Mayan ethnic identity, and to promote the integral and harmonious development of the Indian population with the linguistic context of a plural Guatemalan society so that it may respond to its own authentic needs and legitimate interests". Initially focusing on the Kʼicheʼ, Kaqchikel, Qʼeqchi and Mam language communities, PRONEBI's five-year goal was to provide bilingual education in 800 schools. Half of them, known as "complete schools", would establish a bilingual curriculum for preschool through fourth grade. After the fourth year of schooling, students would follow a monolingual Spanish curriculum. The other 400 schools, known as "incomplete schools", would offer only the preschool curriculum. PRONEBI's Section of Curricular Development designs and distributes bilingual resources for students and teachers.

=== Outcomes ===
Early assessments of PRONEBI's bilingual programs indicated that the programs were consistent with Guatemalan public policy and focused on strengthening native-language skills in the early school years to accelerate Spanish language acquisition in later years. Bilingual education programs have reduced repetition and dropout rates and improved students' performance in reading, writing, mathematics and Spanish. According to a 1986-1991 study, indigenous students enrolled in the bilingual program improved their academic performance. PRONEBI benefits girls in particular; although indigenous boys in PRONEBI schools performed as well as non-PRONEBI boys, PRONEBI girls outperformed non-PRONEBI girls. Within the program, results varied between complete and incomplete schools; students at complete PRONEBI schools received higher test scores than students at incomplete schools.

Spanish proficiency by the end of the fourth year of school suggests further academic success, since a solid foundation in Spanish gives students an advantage in the monolingual Spanish curriculum following the fourth year of school. Long-term projections suggest that bilingual education may improve economic opportunities for indigenous Guatemalans and reduce the income disparity between the country's indigenous and non-indigenous populations.

World Bank projections suggest that PRONEBI, by reducing the repetition rate, may reduce the cost of education in Guatemala. However, increased costs of implementing bilingual education programs, especially as PRONEBI expands to more rural areas and less-widely-spoken languages, may offset that savings.

=== Public response ===
Mayan parents recognize the value of Spanish literacy for their children, especially since Spanish-language skills increase job opportunities. Parents also remember when Spanish-language use was compulsory in formal education. At the same time, they have minimal expectations for their children: that they learn arithmetic and Spanish-language skills (reading, writing and listening). The educational system may be considered "extra", an accessory of the community education received through the family. This community education includes values and principles that may (or may not) be taught at school, including gender roles, a positive attitude toward work, discipline, community spirit and respect. Bridging the academic development of the student at school and at home presents more challenges, especially when parents are monolingual Mayan-language speakers. If their children learn Spanish at PRONEBI schools, though, Mayan parents generally view the program positively.

PRONEBI has received praise and criticism nationally and internationally. Although the program is part of the Ministry of Education, it has been criticized for being "too Mayan". Although PRONEBI attempts to prevent the use of Spanish loanwords (Hispanicisms) in bilingual classrooms, bilingual teachers often express concepts which do not exist in the Mayan languages (like "flashlight" or "numerator") with Spanish loanwords. PRONEBI aims to retain the "purity" of the Mayan languages by encouraging the development of neologisms, using Mayan-language lexicons to express foreign concepts. However, some Mayan intellectuals and activists believe that PRONEBI is not sufficiently representative of Mayan identity.

Critiques of the educational program are often related to implementation obstacles. Two criticisms are the disparities in the amount of resources available to speakers of each Mayan language and the standardization of a Mayan alphabet which is not representative of the entire Mayan-language family. Critics have said that bilingual resources still marginalize the Mayan worldview (tacitly or overtly), perpetuating European ethnocentrism. Proponents of the program say that PRONEBI restores social value to Mayan languages and culture. In some cases, intercultural bilingual education for children may motivate adults in indigenous communities to begin (or continue) indigenous-language learning informally or through Mayan revitalization organizations.
