= Hispanicization =

Process by which a place or person becomes influenced by Hispanic culture

Hispanicization or Hispanization (Spanish: hispanización) refers to the process by which a place or person becomes influenced by Hispanic culture or a process of cultural and/or linguistic change in which something non-Hispanic becomes Hispanic. Hispanicization is illustrated by spoken Spanish, production and consumption of Hispanic food, Spanish language music, and participation in Hispanic festivals and holidays. In the former Spanish colonies, the term is also used in the narrow linguistic sense of the Spanish language replacing indigenous languages.

== Spain ==
Within Spain, the term "Hispanicization" can refer to the cultural and linguistic absorption of the ethnically Berber Guanches, the indigenous people of the Canary Islands in the century following their subjugation in the 15th century.

It is relatively rarely used as a synonym for "Castilianization" (castellanización) i.e. the historical process whereby speakers of minority Spanish languages such as Catalan, Basque, Galician, Astur-Leonese or Aragonese are linguistically assimilated and progressively abandon their language for Spanish. Since all of the aforementioned languages are co-official languages together with Castilian Spanish, the term "Castilianization" is preferred.

The Moriscos (Muslims who had converted to Christianity but continued to live in distinct communities) had undergone an intensive, forced Hispanicization. Upon conversion, they were all given Spanish names by which they were known in all official documents (though in private, they probably often continued to use their original Arabic names). In 1567, Philip II of Spain issued a royal decree forbidding Moriscos from the use of Arabic on all occasions, formal and informal, speaking and writing. Using Arabic in any sense of the word would be regarded as a crime. They were given three years to learn a "Christian" language, after which they would have to get rid of all Arabic written material. It is unknown how many of the Moriscos complied with the decree and destroyed their own Arabic books and how many kept them in defiance of the King's decree; the decree is known to have triggered one of the largest Morisco Revolts. Ultimately, the Moriscos had only two choices – either accept a complete Hispanicization and give up any trace of their original identity, or be deported to North Africa.

== United States ==
According to the 2000 United States census, about 75% of all Hispanics spoke Spanish at home. Hispanic retention rates are so high in parts of Texas and New Mexico and along the border because the percentage of Hispanics living there is also very high. Laredo, Texas; Chimayo, New Mexico; Nogales, Arizona; and later in the 20th century Coachella, California, for example, all have Hispanic populations greater than 90 percent. Furthermore, these places have had a Hispanic-majority population since the time of the Spanish conquest and colonization of the area in the 17th and 18th centuries.

Some previously Anglo-majority cities have since become majority Hispanic, such as Miami (Hispanic majority by the 1970s) and San Antonio (Hispanic majority by the 1980s).

== Hispanic America ==
In Spanish America it is also used to refer to the imposition of the Spanish language in the former Spanish colonies and its adoption by indigenous peoples. This refers to Spain's influence which began in the late 15th century and the Spanish Empire beginning in the colonization of the Canary Islands in 1402 which is now part of Spain. Later the landing of Christopher Columbus in 1492 in the Caribbean then Central America and South America. All these countries were Hispanicized; however, there are still many people there who hold a culture that still has its origins in the Indigenous peoples of the Americas. Until recently, Castilianization has been official policy by the governments of many Hispanic American countries. Only recently programs of intercultural bilingual education have been introduced to a substantial extent. The same situation happens in European populations of non-Spanish origin, like Italian and German populations in Chile and Venezuela; this is voluntarily as many of them still speak their native languages, but mostly as second languages. In order to preserve the languages of Indigenous peoples, many countries now promote the concept of Intercultural bilingual education. In Bolivia, for example, President Evo Morales and Foreign Minister David Choquehuanca have emphasized that intercultural education should be mandatory for all citizens. This includes requiring Spanish speakers to learn Indigenous languages such as Quechua and Aymara, ensuring that all Bolivians are able to communicate in at least two national languages.

== Philippines ==
The Philippine archipelago was ruled from Mexico as a territory of New Spain, from 1565 to 1821 and as a province of Spain until 1898. Since the late 16th century, the Hispanic culture has intemperately influenced, shaped, and become the foundation of modern Filipino cultural landscape. Derived from Austronesian and Iberian influences, modern Filipino culture is a blend of Eastern and Western (mostly Spanish) traditions. Although most Filipinos still primarily speak an Austronesian language, the Philippine languages have thousands of Spanish loanwords. Furthermore, a number of Filipinos to the south speak a Spanish-based creole known as Chavacano.

== See also ==
- Chilenization
- Language politics in Spain under Franco
- Mexicanization
- Mexifornia

== Bibliography ==
- Beatriz Garza Cuaron and Doris Bartholomew. Languages of intercommunication in Mexico. In: Stephen Adolphe Wurm, Peter Mühlhäusler, Darrell T. Tyron (1996), Atlas of languages of intercultural communication in the Pacific (1622 pages), pp. 1254–1290. Chapter 2. Historical outline, p. 1258, 2.1.5: Replacement of the dominant indigenous languages by Spanish, pp. 1260–1262. Chapter 4: Spanish as a language of intercommunication, from the Conquest to present. pp. 1270–1271.
- Rainer Enrique Hamel: Bilingual Education for Indigenous Communities in Mexico. Encyclopedia of Language and Education (2008), Part 5, Part 18, pp. 1747–1758.
- Juan Carlos Godenzzi: Language Policy and Education in the Andes. Encyclopedia of Language and Education (2008), Part 1, Part 4, pp. 315–329.
