= Sihochac =

- Coordinates: 19°13′26″N 90°14′54″W

Area
  - Total: 1,499 km^{2} (579 sq mi)

Population
  - Total: 2,756

Sihochac is a town in the municipality of Champotón in the Mexican state of Campeche. In 2010, Sihochac had a population of 2,731, and in 2020 Sihochac had a population of 2,756. Sihochac is home to Escuela Secundaria General #11. Mexican Federal Highway 188 runs through Sihochac.

== History ==
=== Spanish Conquest of Chanputún ===
Sihochac was a town in the Yucatec Mayan Province of Champutún. In 1540, Francisco de Montejo the Younger launched the invasion of Chanputún from the newly-established, coastal Spanish military base San Pedro de Champotón. While Montejo's soldiers advanced out of San Pedro de Champotón along the Mayan road, they were blocked by Mayan soldiers near the entrance of Sihocahc. The Mayans constructed stone and wood barricades on the road at the entrance, while dense jungle flanked both sides of the road, forcing Montejo's forces to attempt seizing Sihochac if they wished to advance. So, on July 7, 1540, the Spaniards and their allied central Mexican auxiliary forces assaulted the barricades, won the battle, and seized Sihochac. One Spaniard and several dozen auxiliaries died in the battle, while about a dozen Spaniards were wounded.

First contact with the Spanish, as well as Montejo's conquest, proved catastrophic for the Mayans of Chanputún. Its population plummeted: at contact, Champutún and the neighboring province of Acalan had a population of 110,000. However, a devastating smallpox epidemic ripped through the area in 1519, while war and Francisco de Montejo's establishment of the encomienda killed many as well. By 1549, a Spanish assessment of Chanputún showed only 2,000 Mayans remaining.

== Economy ==
Sugarcane, hibiscus, cedar, fruit trees, and maize are grown in Sihochac, with sugarcane being the most important crop economically. In 2019, there were 1,200 producers of sugarcane in Sihochac belonging to the Unión Cañera de Sihochac (Sihochac Sugarcane Union). These farmers sell their sugar cane to the La Joya Sugarcane Mill, west of Sihochac in the town of La Joya. The sugar cane mill is owned by Grupo Azucarero del Trópico, which itself is owned in part by the businessman Carlos Seoane Castro.
