= Awakatek people =

Awakatek (Awakateko)
Qatanum

Total population
- 11,068

Regions with significant populations
- Guatemala: Huehuetenango
- Mexico: Chiapas, Campeche

Languages
- Awakatek, Spanish

Religion
- Catholic, Evangelicalist, Maya religion

Related ethnic groups
- Ixil

The Awakatek (Aguacateco: Qatanum, transl. "our people"; Spanish: Awakateko) are a Indigenous Maya people located in the municipality of Champotón, Campeche, México and in the municipality of Aguacatán in the department of Huehuetenango, Guatemala, place where they have their original settlement.

The word Awakateko is a reference to the town of Aguacatán, which in Nahuatl means “place of abundant avocados”, they call themselves Qatanum, which translates to “our people”.

They formally settled in the southern Mexican territory during the Guatemalan Civil War in search of refuge from the violence, genocide, and military persecution of which the Indigenous peoples of their region were targeted. Finally, in Campeche, they founded new permanent communities along with other Indigenous peoples such as the Ixil and the Q'eqchi'.

== History ==
Archaeological evidence of their pre-Hispanic presence has been discovered in Chalchitán (a town originally called Coacutec due to its Nahuan origins). During a missionary expedition in 1643, the Irish Dominican Tomás Gage noted in his chronicles the cultivation of grapes by the Awakatek. In 1891, Chalchitán was incorporated into Aguacatán, resulting in the Chalchiteco people and the Aguacatecos forming social relationships. Francisco Antonio de Fuentes y Guzmán reported in his work “Recordación Florida” that Chalchitán and Aguacatán were inhabited by around 480 speakers of a language with a "guttural pronunciation".

== Language ==
Their native Awakatek language (or qyool, "our language") is a Mayan language from the Mamean branch closely related to the ixil language. It is currently at very high risk of disappearance.

== Location ==
The Awakatek of Mexico are located in the state of Campeche in three communities in the municipality of Champotón; Maya Tecún, Maya Tecún II and Santo Domingo Kesté, there is also Awakatek population in the state of Chiapas.

In Guatemala they live in municipality of Aguacatán, located in the Sierra de los Cuchumatanes region of the department of Huehuetenango.

== Religion ==
Their religion is mostly Catholicism mixed with native elements related to natural features, such as mountains, hills, water, clouds and rivers. Their patron saint is the Virgen de la Encarnación.

== Economy ==
According to data from the Federal Telecommunications Institute of Mexico, 60% of the Awakatek population in Mexico has a cell phone while 53.85% are at a very low level of marginalization, 15.38% at medium and 7.69% at high.
