= Nayarit Castellot =

Town in Campeche, Mexico

Nayarit Castellot Xno'ha
- Rural Locality
- Location within Mexico
- Coordinates: 19°13′28.040″N 90°15′1.197″W

Population
  - Total: 373

Nayarit Castellot is a town in Campeche, Mexico in the Champotón Municipality. In 2010, Nayarit Castollot had a population of 299, and in 2020 Nayarit Castellot had a total population of 373 people. The main economic activity is animal husbandry, with the main product being cattle. Nayarit Castellot is home to Telesecundaria Numero 36.

== June 2024 Floods ==
In late June, 2024, severe flooding affected the Yohultún valley in Campeche, which includes Nayarit Castellot. Tropical Storm Alberto (2024), at that point still Potential Tropical Cyclone One, caused sinkholes and damage to the San Dimas-Nayarit de Castellot highway, rendering the road impassible.
