= Awakatek language =

Mayan language of Guatemala

Awakatek
- Aguacatec, Coyotin
- Qa'yol
- Native to: Guatemala
- Region: Huehuetenango
- Ethnicity: 12,500 Awakatek (2019 census)
- Native speakers: 10,100 in Guatemala (2019 census); 20 in Mexico (2020 census)
- Language family: Mayan: Quichean–Mamean; Greater Mamean; Ixilan; Awakatek
- Dialects: Chalchitek

Official status
- Recognised minority language in: Guatemala; Mexico
- Regulated by: Academia de Lenguas Mayas de Guatemala

Language codes
- ISO 639-3: agu
- Glottolog: agua1252
- ELP: Awakateko
- Awakatek is classified as Vulnerable in Guatemala by the UNESCO Atlas of the World's Languages in Danger.

- Awakatek is classified as Critically Endangered in Mexico by the UNESCO Atlas of the World's Languages in Danger.

Awakatek (also known as Aguateco, Awaketec, Coyotin, and Balamiha, and natively as Qa'yol) is a Mayan language spoken in Guatemala, primarily in Huehuetenango and around Aguacatán. The language has fewer than 10,000 speakers, and is considered vulnerable by UNESCO. In addition, the language in Mexico is at high risk of endangerment, with fewer than 2,000 speakers in the state of Campeche in 2010 (although the number of speakers was unknown as of 2000).

Awakatek is closely related to Ixil and the two languages together form the sub-branch Ixilean, which together with the Mamean languages, Mam and Tektitek, form a sub-branch Greater-Mamean, which again, together with the Greater-Quichean languages, ten Mayan languages, including Kʼicheʼ, form the branch Quichean–Mamean.

Otto Stoll wrote of a second Aguacatec language separate from the subject of this article which appears to be spurious, possibly misinformed by his maid.

== Chalchitek ==
Chalchitek
- Chalchitec
- Native to: Guatemala
- Region: Huehuetenango
- Language family: Mayan: Quichean–Mamean; Greater Mamean; Ixilan; Awakatek; Chalchitek

Language codes
- ISO 639-3: None (mis)
- Glottolog: None
- ELP: Awakateko

Chalchitek (or Chalchitec) is sometimes considered a dialect of Awakatek. In recent years, however, it has been recognized as a distinct language by the Guatemalan government. Chalchitek is primarily spoken in the Chalchitán neighborhood of Aguacatán.

== Etymology ==
The Awakatek people themselves refer to their language as qaʼyol, literally meaning 'our word'. They also call themselves qatanum, which means 'our people' and is distinct from the word Awakatec, which is used in Spanish in reference to the municipality of Aguacatán (which means 'place of abundant avocados' and refers to agricultural production and not specifically to the indigenous people).

== Phonology ==
=== Vowels ===
	Front		Central		Back	
	short	long	short	long	short	long
Close	i /i/	ii /iː/			u /u/	uu /uː/
Mid	e /e/	ee /eː/			o /o/	oo /oː/
Open			a /a/	aa /aː/		

=== Diphthongs ===
There are four diphthongs: ay /aj/, ey /ej/, oy /oj/, uy /uj/.

=== Consonants ===
		Bilabial	Alveolar	Postalveolar	Retroflex	Palatal	Velar		Uvular	Glottal
		Bilabial	Alveolar	Postalveolar	Retroflex	Palatal	Normal	Palatalized	Uvular	Glottal
Plosive	Normal	p /p/	t /t/				k /k/	ky /kʲ/	q /q/	' /ʔ/
Plosive	Ejective		tʼ /tʼ/				kʼ /kʼ/	kyʼ/kʼʲ/	qʼ /qʼ/	
Plosive	Implosive	bʼ /ɓ/								
Nasal		m /m/	n /n/							
Fricative			s /s/	xh /ʃ/	x /ʂ/					j /h/
Affricate	Normal		tz /t͡s/	ch /t͡ʃ/	tx /ʈ͡ʂ/					
Affricate	Ejective		tzʼ /t͡sʼ/	chʼ /t͡ʃʼ/	txʼ /ʈ͡ʂʼ/					
Trill			r /r/							
Approximant			l /l/			y /j/	w /w/			

The coronal ejectives may be allophonically pre-voiced.

== Vocabulary ==
Sample words
English	Aguacateco
One	Juun
Two	Kob'
Three	Ox
Four	Kyaaj
Five	O'
Six	Qaq
Seven	Juug
Eight	Wajwax
Nine	B'eluj
Ten	Lajuj
Man	Yaaj
Woman	Xna'n
Dog	Tx'i'
Sun	Q'eej
Moon	Xaaw
Water	A'
Mother	Ntxuu'
Father	Ntaaj
House	Ka'l
Black	Q'eq
White	Saq
Corn	Ixi'n
Fish	Kay
Dog	Xhwiit
Deer	Cheej
Jaguar	B'alam
Monkey	Aq'
Rabbit	Umul
Mouse	Ichi
Bird	Ch'ut
Fish	Kay
Snake	Lupa
