= History of African-American culture =

African Americans and their culture are the result of an amalgamation of many different countries, cultures, tribes and religions during the 16th and 17th centuries, which were broken down, and rebuilt upon shared experiences and blended into one group on the North American continent during the Trans-Atlantic Slave Trade.

== Overview ==
Most African Americans are the descendants of enslaved people who lived within the boundaries of the present United States. In addition, African Americans that are American Descendant of Slaves (ADOS) are primarily of West African and coastal Central African ancestry, with varying amounts of Western European and Native American ancestry.

Roughly one-in-five Black people in the U.S. are immigrants or children of Black immigrants. While some Black immigrants or their children may also come to identify with African Americans, Black immigrants to the U.S. are not part of the African American ethnic group. The majority of first-generation immigrants from Africa prefer to identify with their nation of origin. There is some recent research which shows that some Black immigrants to the US resist assimilation to reduce exposure to racial discrimination faced by native-born African Americans.

=== Shared history in the Americas ===
African American slaves in Georgia, 1850

From the earliest days of American slavery in the 17th century, slave holders sought to exercise control over their people that were forced into slavery by attempting to strip them of their African culture. In the New World in general and in the United States in particular, the physical isolation and the societal marginalization of African enslaved people, and, later, the physical isolation and the societal marginalization of their free progeny facilitated the retention of significant elements of traditional culture among Africans. Slave holders deliberately tried to repress independent political or cultural organization in order to deal with the many slave rebellions or acts of resistance that took place in the United States, Brazil, Haiti, and the Dutch Guyanas.

African cultures, slavery, slave rebellions, and the civil rights movement have all shaped African-American religious, familial, political, and economic behaviors.

Various African traditions provided a foundation for the spiritual practices of enslaved individuals, who blended ancestral beliefs with Christianity to create various forms of worship. This cultural resilience was evident in slave rebellions, which challenged the institution of slavery and fostered a sense of community and shared identity among African Americans. The civil rights movement emerged as a powerful continuation of this struggle. This historical legacy influenced contemporary African-American families and shaped their values, community structures, and approaches to political engagement, with the enduring economic impacts of systemic inequality driving a commitment to empowerment and social change.

The imprint of Africa is evident in politics, economics, language, music, hairstyles, fashion, dance, religion, cuisine, and worldview. Throughout all of this, African Americans created their own culture and history in the United States. In turn, African-American culture has had a pervasive and transformative impact on many elements of mainstream American culture. This process of mutual creative exchange is called creolization. Over time, the culture of African slaves and their descendants has had a ubiquitous impact on the dominant American culture and on world culture.

== Oral tradition ==
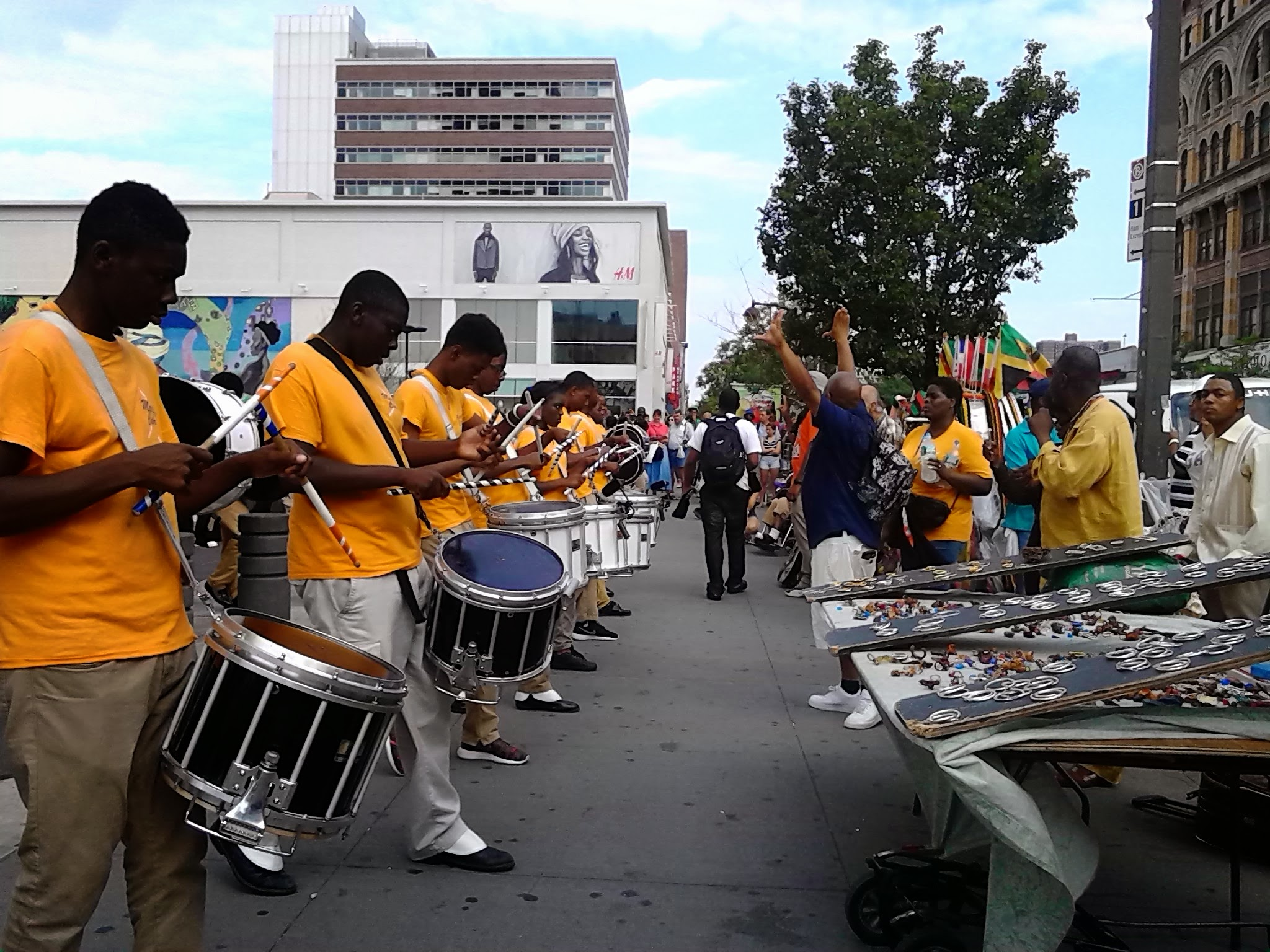
Band rehearsal on 125th Street in Harlem, the historic epicenter of African-American culture. New York City is home by a significant margin to the world's largest African-American population of any city outside Africa, at over 2.2 million. African immigration to New York City is now driving the growth of the city's African-American and African population.

The holders of enslaved trapped people (slaves) limited or prohibited their education, the fear was that education might empower the people, and inspire or enable emancipatory ambitions. In the United States, the legislation that banned enslaved people from getting a formal education likely contributed to their maintenance of a strong oral tradition, a common feature of indigenous or native African culture. This prohibition remained in effect until the passage of the Reconstruction Acts in the late 1860s. Specifically, the Civil Rights Act of 1866 and the Fourteenth Amendment (ratified in 1868) both helped lay the groundwork for broader educational opportunities by granting citizenship and equal protection under the law to African Americans, although they did not directly mandate school integration.

African-based oral traditions became the primary means of preserving history, mores, and other cultural information among the people. This was consistent with the griot practices of oral history in many native African culture and other cultures that did not rely on the written word. Many of these cultural elements have been passed from generation to generation through storytelling. The folktales provided African-Americans the opportunity to inspire and educate one another.

Examples of African-American folktales include trickster tales of Br'er Rabbit and heroic tales such as that of John Henry. The Uncle Remus stories by Joel Chandler Harris helped to bring African-American folk tales into mainstream adoption. Harris did not appreciate the complexity of the stories nor their potential for a lasting impact on society. Other narratives that appear as important, recurring motifs in African-American culture are the "Signifying Monkey", "The Ballad of Shine", and the legend of Stagger Lee.

The legacy of the African-American oral tradition manifests in diverse forms. African-American preachers tend to perform rather than simply speak. The emotion of the subject is carried through the speaker's tone, volume, and cadence, which tend to mirror the rising action, climax, and descending action of the sermon. The meaning of this manner of preaching is not easily understood by European Americans or others of non-African origin. Often song, dance, verse, and structured pauses are placed throughout the sermon. Call and response is another element of the African-American oral tradition. It manifests in worship in what is commonly referred to as the "amen corner". In direct contrast to the tradition present in American and European cultures, it is an acceptable and common audience reaction to interrupt and affirm the speaker. This pattern of interaction is also in evidence in music, particularly in blues and jazz forms. Hyperbolic and provocative, even incendiary, rhetoric is another aspect of African-American oral tradition often evident in the pulpit in a tradition sometimes referred to as "prophetic speech".

Modernity and migration of African-American communities to the North has had a history of placing strain on the retention of African-American cultural practices and traditions. The urban and radically different spaces in which black culture was being produced raised fears in anthropologists and sociologists that the southern African-American folk aspect of black popular culture were at risk of being lost within history. The study over the fear of losing black popular cultural roots from the South has been a topic of interest to many anthropologists, who among them include Zora Neale Hurston. Through her extensive studies of Southern folklore and cultural practices, Hurston has claimed that the popular Southern folklore traditions and practices are not dying off, instead they are evolving, developing, and re-creating themselves in different regions.

Other aspects of African-American oral tradition include the dozens, signifying, trash talk, rhyming, semantic inversion and word play, many of which have found their way into mainstream American popular culture and become international phenomena. During slavery, African Americans adapted these linguistic traditions as a form of covert resistance and survival. Enslaved people developed signifying as a way to communicate subtly under the watchful eyes of slaveholders, often using coded language, humor, and indirection to express dissent, critique the powerful, or convey hidden meanings without being detected.

Spoken-word poetry is another example of how the African-American oral tradition has influenced modern popular culture. Spoken-word artists employ the same techniques as African-American preachers including movement, rhythm, and audience participation. Rap music from the 1980s and beyond has been cited as an extension of African oral culture.

== Harlem Renaissance ==
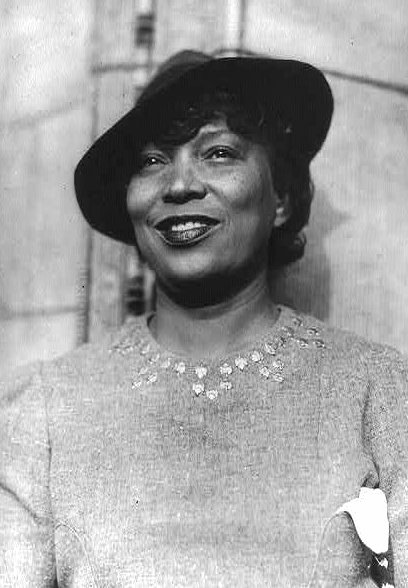
Zora Neale Hurston was a prominent literary figure during the Harlem Renaissance

The first major public recognition of African-American culture occurred during the Harlem Renaissance pioneered by Alain Locke. In the 1920s and 1930s, African-American music, literature, and art gained wide notice. Authors such as Zora Neale Hurston and Nella Larsen and poets such as Langston Hughes, Claude McKay, and Countee Cullen wrote works describing the African-American experience. Jazz, swing, blues and other musical forms entered American popular music. African-American artists such as William H. Johnson, Aaron Douglas, and Palmer Hayden created unique works of art featuring African Americans.

The Harlem Renaissance was also a time of increased political involvement for African Americans. Among the notable African-American political movements founded in the early 20th century are the Universal Negro Improvement Association and the National Association for the Advancement of Colored People. The Nation of Islam, a notable quasi-Islamic religious movement, also began in the early 1930s.

== African-American cultural movement ==
The Black Power movement of the 1960s and 1970s followed in the wake of the non-violent Civil Rights Movement. The movement promoted racial pride and ethnic cohesion in contrast to the focus on integration of the Civil Rights Movement, and adopted a more militant posture in the face of racism. It also inspired a new renaissance in African-American literary and artistic expression generally referred to as the African-American or "Black Arts Movement".

The works of popular recording artists such as Nina Simone ("Young, Gifted and Black") and The Impressions ("Keep On Pushing"), as well as the poetry, fine arts, and literature of the time, shaped and reflected the growing racial and political consciousness. Among the most prominent writers of the African-American Arts Movement were poet Nikki Giovanni; poet and publisher Don L. Lee, who later became known as Haki Madhubuti; poet and playwright Leroi Jones, later known as Amiri Baraka; and Sonia Sanchez. Other influential writers were Ed Bullins, Dudley Randall, Mari Evans, June Jordan, Larry Neal, and Ahmos Zu-Bolton.

During the African American cultural Movement, Melvin Charles and Gleason T Jackson created the Black American Heritage Flag (also known as the African American Heritage Flag) in 1967 for Black Americans. It is used today as an ethnic flag that represents the African American people.

Another major aspect of the African-American Arts Movement was the infusion of the African aesthetic, a return to a collective cultural sensibility and ethnic pride that was much in evidence during the Harlem Renaissance and in the celebration of Négritude among the artistic and literary circles in the US, Caribbean, and the African continent nearly four decades earlier: the idea that "black is beautiful". During this time, there was a resurgence of interest in elements of African culture within African-American culture that had been suppressed or devalued to conform to Eurocentric America. Natural hairstyles, such as the afro, and African clothing, such as the dashiki, gained popularity. More importantly, the African-American aesthetic encouraged personal pride and political awareness among African Americans.

== See also ==
- African-American history
- African immigration to the United States#Culture
