= Champotón Municipality =

Municipality in the Mexican state of Campeche

Champotón
- Municipality
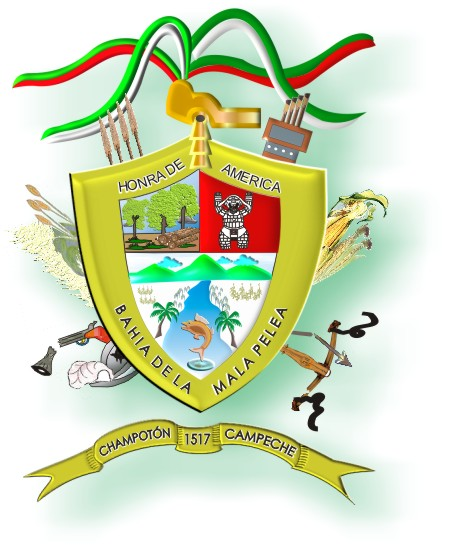
- Coat of arms

- Location of Champotón

- Location within Campeche Location within Mexico
- Coordinates: 19.3472°N 90.7200°W
- Country: Mexico
- State: Campeche
- Municipal seat: Champotón

Area
  - Total: 6,856.04 km^{2} (2,647.13 sq mi)

Population (2015)
  - Total: 78,170
  - Density: 11.40/km^{2} (29.53/sq mi)
- Time zone: UTC−6 (Central (US Central))
- Website: www.champoton.gob.mx

Champotón Municipality is a municipality within the state of Campeche, including the city of Champotón and the surrounding area. In 2010 the municipality of Champotón had a population of 83,021 inhabitants. It has an areal extent of 6,088.28 km^{2} (2,350.7 sq mi).

The municipality also includes the offshore Cayos Arcas, about 140 km northwest of Campeche and 150 km north of the mainland coast of Champotón.

== Demographics ==
As of 2020, the municipality had a total population of 78,170.

As of 2010, the city of Champotón had a population of 30,881. Other than the city of Champotón, the municipality had 864 localities, such as (with 2010 populations in parentheses): Santo Domingo Kesté (3,763), Carrillo Puerto (2,829), Sihochac (2,731), Ley Federal de Reforma Agraria (2,435), classified as urban, and Xbacab (1,649), San Pablo Pixtún (1,498), Maya Tecún I (1,254), Hool (1,181), La Joya (1,007), and Nayarit Castellot (299).
