= Mexicanization =

Mexicanization is the influence of Mexican culture and society on other parts of the world. The term has also been used disparagingly to highlight the rise of political instability and violence in other societies.

== Mexico ==
In a Mexican context, Mexicanization can refer to 20th-century business requirements for domestic ownership.

== United States ==
Mexican influences are most prominent in the United States due to a shared North American history.

=== Post-Civil War ===
American territorial expansion into northern Mexico in the mid-19th century saw some exchanges of culture and survival-related traditions between the two nations' communities. In the decades afterward, the formerly Mexican territories were Americanized, but rising immigration from Mexico then 're-Mexicanized' certain areas.

After the Civil War ended in 1865, the nation went through a few decades of Reconstruction and having to stabilize itself. There was substantial concern around the possibility of the United States collapsing at the time, with several allegories being drawn to the political instability of pre-revolution Mexico. Mexican migrants were also portrayed more negatively as a result.

=== Contemporary era ===
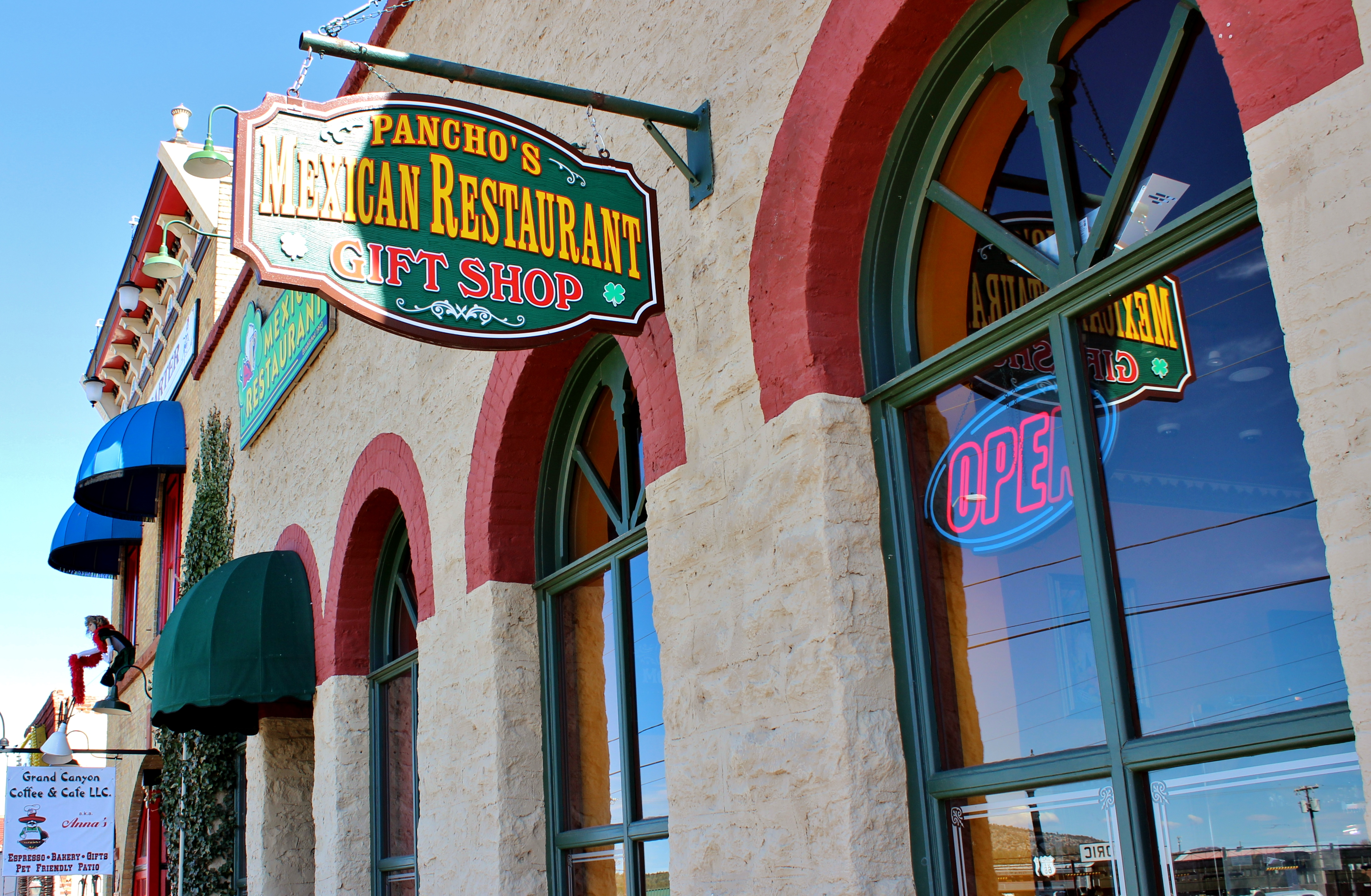
Mexican restaurant in Arizona

Mexican migration to the United States has increased the amount of Mexican heritage, such as cuisine, found in the country. Latin Americans who migrate to the United States sometimes assimilate into Mexican American culture rather than continuing their original cultures, due to Mexican Americans being the predominant Latino group in the nation.

== See also ==
- Mexicanidad
