= Jakaltek language =

Mayan language spoken in Guatemala

Jakaltek
- Poptiʼ
- 'Abʼxubʼal
- Native to: Guatemala, Mexico
- Region: Huehuetenango, Chiapas
- Ethnicity: 54,200 Jakaltek in Guatemala (2019 census)
- Native speakers: 33,000 (2019 census)
- Language family: Mayan: Qʼanjobalan–Chujean; Qʼanjobalan; Kanjobal–Jacaltec; Jakaltek
- Dialects: Eastern; Western
- Writing system: Latin

Official status
- Official language in: Mexico
- Recognised minority language in: Guatemala
- Regulated by: Instituto Nacional de Lenguas Indígenas; Academia de Lenguas Mayas de Guatemala

Language codes
- ISO 639-3: jac
- Glottolog: popt1235 Poptiʼ
- ELP: Jakalteko

The Jakaltek /hɑːkəlˈtɛk/ (Jacaltec) language, also known as Jakalteko (Jacalteco) or Poptiʼ, is a Mayan language from the Q’anjob’alan-chujean branch spoken by the Jakaltek people in some municipalities in the state of Chiapas, Mexico and the municipality of Jacaltenango in the department of Huehuetenango, Guatemala in the border between both countries. Jakaltek is closely related with the Q'anjob'al and Akatek language and more distantly related with the Tojol-ab'al, Chuj and Mocho'. In Mexico it is also known as Ab'xub'al.

== History ==
Jakaltek was the language spoken by the population of the site of El Lagartero, in the present day municipality of La Trinitaria in Chiapas, Mexico, the site was inhabited from 300 AD to 1400 AD between the late classic and postclassic period of Mesoamerica.

== Distribution ==
In Mexico, Jakaltek is mainly spoken in the state of Chiapas in the communities of Bienestar Social, Flor de Mayo, Guadalupe Victoria, Ojo de Agua, Pacayalito and Huixquilar from the municipality of Amatenango de la Frontera, in Los Pocitos from the municipality of Bella Vista, in El Mango, Frontera Comalapa and Sunzapote from the municipality of Frontera Comalapa and in El Vergel Dos, La Campana, La Gloria, El Colorado and Nuevo Villaflores from the municipality of La Trinitaria. There are also Jakaltek communities in Campeche in the municipalities of Campeche and Champotón.

Municipalities in Huehuetenango where Jakaltek is spoken include the following (Variación Dialectal en Poptiʼ, 2000).

- Concepción Huista
- Jacaltenango (including the following villages)
  - San Marcos Huista
  - San Andrés Huista
  - Yinhchʼewex
- Nentón
- San Antonio Huista
- Santa Ana Huista
- Buxup
- Tzisbʼaj

== Media ==
Jakaltek-language programming is carried by the INPI's radio station XEVFS, broadcasting from Las Margaritas, Chiapas.

== Phonology ==
The Eastern Jakaltek language includes the following phonemes. The orthography used by the Academia de Lenguas Mayas de Guatemala is on the left, the other main orthography is on the right.

| | | Labial | Alveolar | | Post- alveolar | Retroflex | Palatal | Velar | Uvular | Glottal |
|---|---|---|---|---|---|---|---|---|---|---|
| Nasal | | m ⟨m⟩ | n ⟨n⟩ | | | | | ŋ ⟨nh or n̈/ŋ⟩ | | |
| Plosive/ Affricate | plain | p ⟨p⟩ | t ⟨t⟩ | ts ⟨tz⟩ | tʃ ⟨ch⟩ | tʂ ⟨tx⟩ | | k ⟨k or c/qu⟩ | q ⟨q or k⟩ | ʔ ⟨ʼ⟩ |
| Plosive/ Affricate | glottalized | ɓ ⟨b or bʼ⟩ | tʼ ⟨tʼ⟩ | tsʼ ⟨tzʼ⟩ | tʃʼ ⟨chʼ⟩ | tʂʼ ⟨txʼ⟩ | | kʼ ⟨kʼ or cʼ/qʼu⟩ | qʼ ⟨qʼ or kʼ⟩ | ʔ ⟨ʼ⟩ |
| Fricative | | f ⟨f⟩ | s ⟨s⟩ | | ʃ ⟨xh or ẍ⟩ | ʂ ⟨x⟩ | | | χ ⟨j⟩ | h ⟨h⟩ |
| Approximant | | w ⟨w⟩ | l ⟨l⟩ | | | | j ⟨y⟩ | | | |
| Trill | | | r ⟨r⟩ | | | | | | | |

It also has the vowels a /a/, e /e/, i /i/, o /o/, u /u/

== Orthography ==
=== ⟨n̈⟩ ===
Eastern Jakaltek is one of the few languages besides the Malagasy language of Madagascar to make use of an n-trema character in its alphabet. In both languages, the n-trema represents a velar nasal consonant [ŋ] (like "ng" in "bang").

== Grammar ==
The Jakaltek language has a verb–subject–object syntax. Like many Native American languages, Jakaltek has complex agglutinative morphology and uses ergative–absolutive case alignment. It is divided in two dialects, Eastern and Western Jakalteko. "Eastern and Western Jakalteko understand each other's spoken languages, but not written text."

Jakaltek is unusual in that it has four systems of noun and numeral classifiers.

== Bibliography ==
- Craig, Colette G. (1977). The Structure of Jacaltec. Austin: University of Texas Press. 432pp.
