= Akatek =

Akatek or Acatec may refer to:

- Akatek people, an ethnic group of Guatemala
- Akatek language, a Mayan language

== See also ==
- acatech, the German Academy of Science and Engineering
