= Akateko =

Akateko may refer to:

- Akateko people, an ethnic group of Guatemala
- Akateko language, a Mayan language
- Akateko (folklore), a monster in Japanese folklore
