= Jakaltek =

Jakaltek may refer to:

- the Jakaltek people
- the Jakaltek language
