= Nentón River =

- Native name: Río Nentón (Spanish)

Location
- Countries: Guatemala and Mexico

Physical characteristics
- Source
  - location: Guatemala (Huehuetenango)
  - coordinates: 15.818681°N 91.620569°W
  - elevation: 2,000 m (6,600 ft)
- Mouth
  - location: Tributary of the Seleguá River

The Río Nentón is a river in Guatemala. From its sources in the Sierra de los Cuchumatanes mountain range of Huehuetenango, the river flows in a north-westerly direction, crosses the border with Mexico at 15.797705°N 91.891150°W and joins the Río Seleguá which continues northwards to the Presa de La Angostura, one of Mexico's largest artificial lakes. The Nentón river basin covers an area of 1,451 square kilometres (560 sq mi) in Guatemala.
