= Zaculeu =

Maya archaeological site in Guatemala

- Saqulew
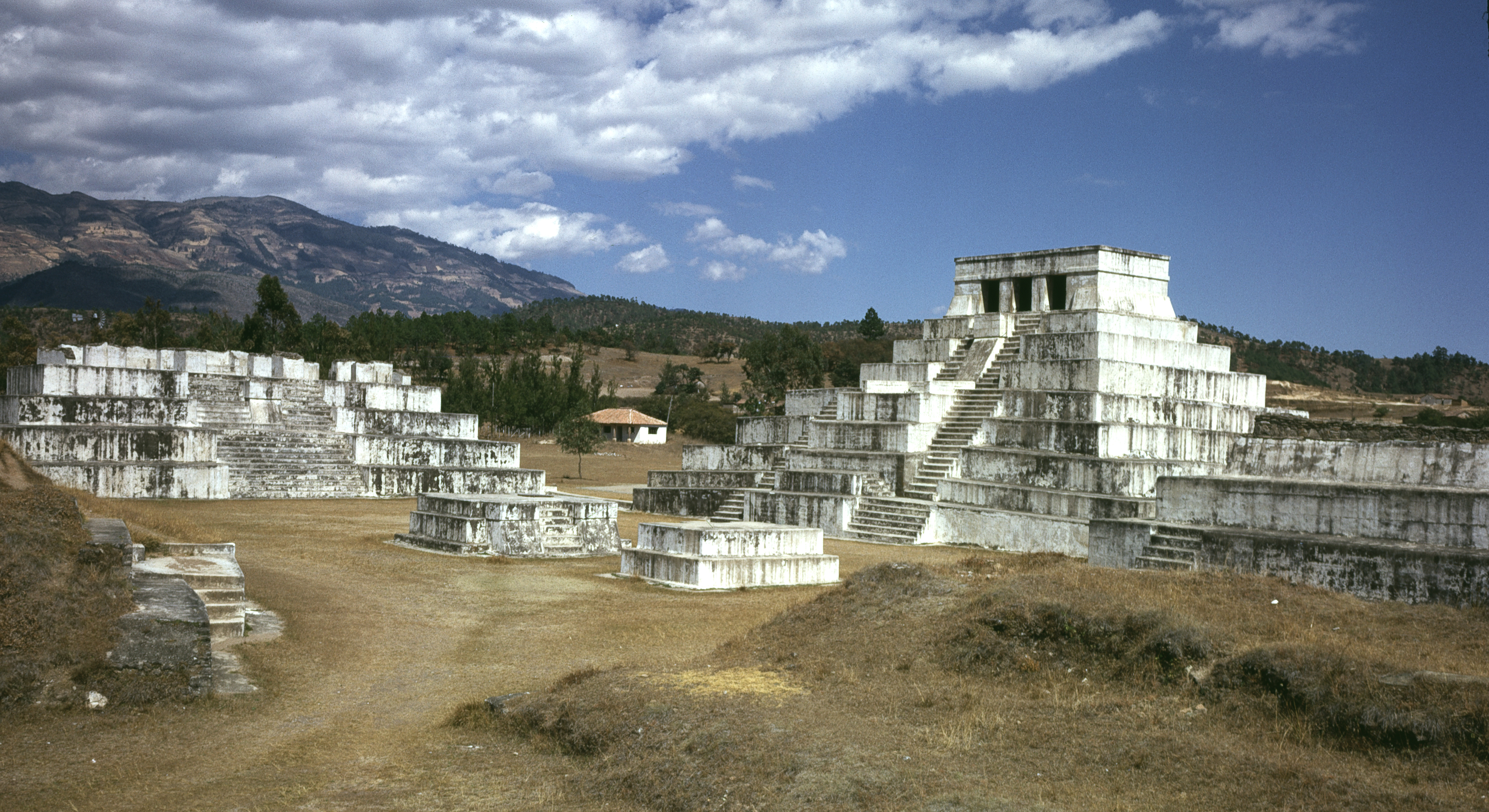
- Plaza 1 with Structure 6 at the left and Structure 1 at the right. The small platforms in the plaza are Structures 11 and 12.

- Location within Guatemala Zaculeu (Mesoamerica)
- 15°20′1.66″N 91°29′33.88″W
- Periods: Early Classic to Late Postclassic
- Cultures: Maya civilization
- Location: Huehuetenango
- Region: Huehuetenango Department, Guatemala

History
- Built: Early Classic c.AD 250–600
- Abandoned: 1525
- Event(s): Conquered by: Kʼicheʼ Kingdom of Qʼumarkaj (Postclassic); Gonzalo de Alvarado y Contreras of Spain (1525)

Site notes
- Architectural styles: Mesoamerican pyramids with talud-tablero style architecture and double stairways
- Excavation dates: 1940s
- Archaeologists: John M. Dimick
- Restored by United Fruit Company (Late 1940s) Responsible body: Ministerio de Cultura y Deportes

Zaculeu or Saqulew is a pre-Columbian Maya archaeological site in the highlands of western Guatemala, about 3.7 kilometres (2.3 mi) outside the modern city of Huehuetenango. Occupation at the site dates to the Early Classic period (AD 250–600) of Mesoamerican history. Zaculeu was the capital of the Postclassic Mam kingdom, and was conquered by the Kʼicheʼ Kingdom of Qʼumarkaj. It displays a mixture of Mam and Kʼicheʼ style architecture.

In AD 1525 the city was attacked by Spanish conquistadors under Gonzalo de Alvarado y Contreras during a siege that lasted several months. Kayb'il B'alam, the city's last ruler, finally surrendered to the Spanish due to starvation.

The site contains a number of temple-pyramids with talud-tablero style architecture and double stairways. The pyramids and governmental palaces are grouped around a series of large public plazas. The site also holds a court for playing the Mesoamerican ballgame. The site was originally fortified with walls.

The site was restored by the United Fruit Company in the late 1940s. It is open to tourists and includes a small museum.

== Etymology and location ==
The name Zaculeu means "white earth" in the Mam, Kʼicheʼ and Q'anjob'al languages, from saq (adj) meaning "white" and ulew (n) meaning "earth". In the Mam language, the site is also called Chinabajul.

The present-day village of San Lorenzo developed around this archeological site, on the outskirts of Huehuetenango city, in the Guatemalan department of Huehuetenango. Zaculeu is the main tourist attraction in the Huehuetenango area. Zaculeu is located at an altitude of 1,900 metres (6,200 ft) above mean sea level, and is bordered by the Sierra de los Cuchumatanes mountain range.

Zaculeu is located in an area of fertile soils close to the Selegua and Viña rivers. The site is situated on a plateau overlooking the Selegua River, which flows to the west of the city. Deep ravines bordering the site to the south and east protected its access. The only access to the site is via a narrow land bridge to the north, which unites the plateau to the general level of the valley floor. The Zaculeu plateau measures 11,178 square varas (4191 square metres).

== History ==
Zaculeu was first occupied in the Early Classic Period (AD 250–600), and the buildings from this era show the architectural influence of the great metropolis of Teotihuacán in the Valley of Mexico. The largest constructions date from the Classic Period (AD 250–900). To these were added other plaza groups and buildings in the Early Postclassic (AD 900–1200) and Late Postclassic (AD 1200–1525) in an unbroken history. Zaculeu has been used as a ceremonial site by Mam Maya continuously to the present.

Zaculeu came under the influence of central Mexico again in the Late Classic. The architectural influence is so distinct that it suggests that a foreign Mexican elite may have settled at the city and continued in occupation there until the Kʼicheʼ conquered the site in the Postclassic.

=== Kʼicheʼ conquest ===
The Kʼicheʼ Kingdom of Qʼumarkaj conquered Zaculeu in the Postclassic. Traditionally that has been calculated as during the 15th century AD based on ethnohistoric accounts. Radiocarbon dating has pushed back the calculations of the Kʼicheʼ conquests by three centuries, and researchers now say their conquest of the Mam kingdoms may have taken place as early as the 12th century. The city was dominated by the Kʼicheʼ until the Spanish Conquest of the early 16th century.

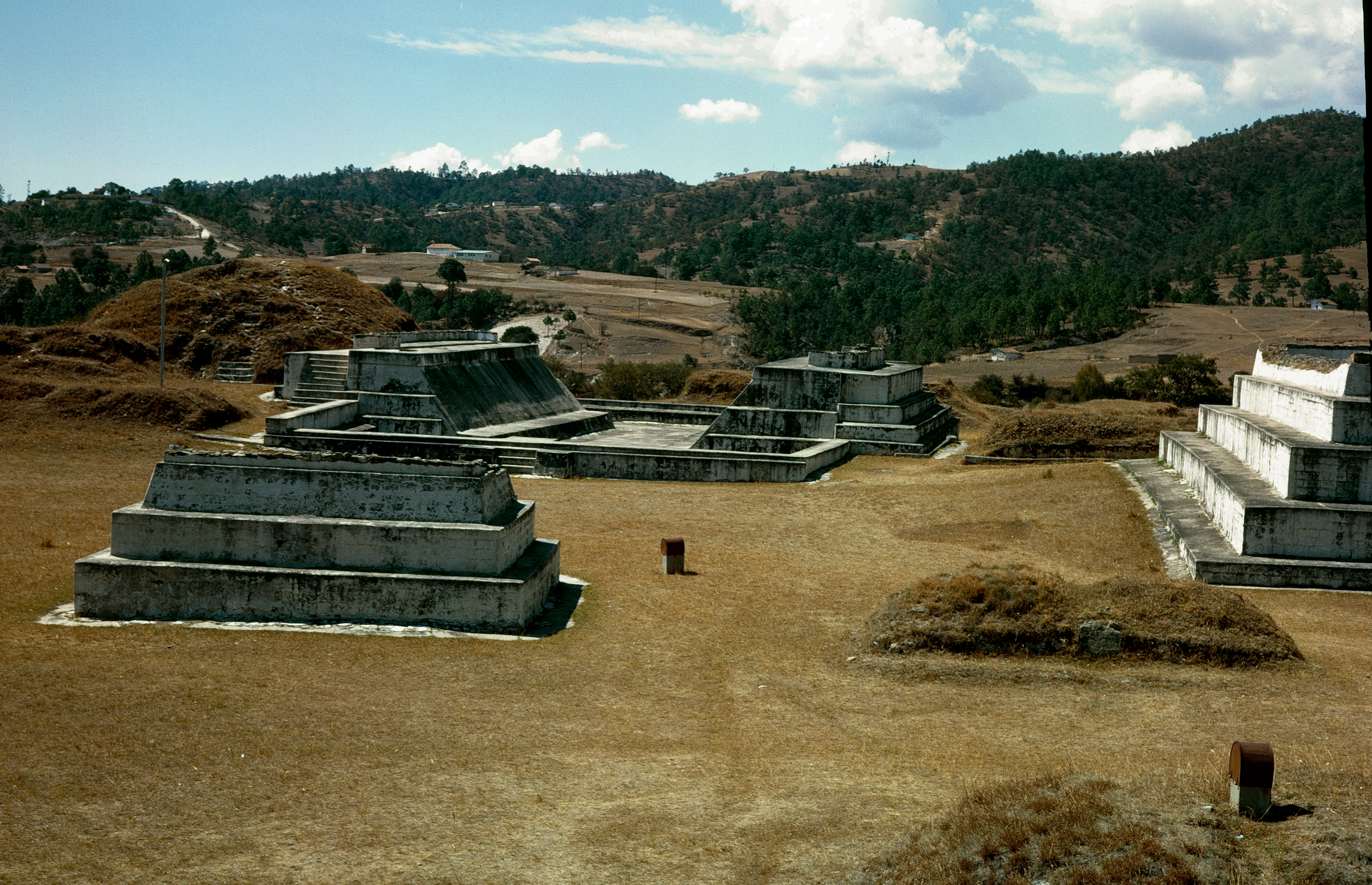
The ballcourt seen across Plaza 2, with the rear of Structure 13 at right.

The Kʼicheʼ king Q'uq'umatz died in battle against a group of the northern Mam. His son K'iq'ab continued where his father had left off and completed the conquest of the people. K'iq'ab was ruler when Zaculeu was conquered by the Kʼicheʼ.' This appears to have been a second Kʼicheʼ conquest of the city, having previously fallen some time earlier. When the Kʼicheʼ conquered another kingdom, its practice was to place the newly subject kingdom under the control of one of the Kʼicheʼ noble lineages. Based on the style of Structure 4, archeologists believe that Zaculeu was likely controlled by the Nija'ib.' The Ilocab, who had conquered much of the region, are another possibility. The Kʼicheʼ tended to place their newly installed ruling elite in a mountain-top fortress securing the population in the valleys below. However, substantial portions of the original Mam population remained in place in the plateau area.

The Kʼicheʼ rebuilt over earlier Classic period structures in a distinctively Kʼicheʼ style. The basic Kʼicheʼ layout consists of a westward-facing temple with a steep talud-tablero facade, flanked by two unequally sized wings. This was likely to have been the temple of Awilix, patron goddess of the Nija'ib' Kʼicheʼ. A longer palace structure lies to the north, facing southwards and the ballcourt to the southwest. This Kʼicheʼ layout was somewhat distorted by the reuse of the earlier architecture, because the typical Mam settlement layout was built along an axis running from southeast to northwest. As the Kʼicheʼ did not completely redesign the entire site along a Kʼicheʼ pattern, the juxtaposition of Mam- and Kʼicheʼ-style complexes demonstrates the fusing of the local and intrusive elite lineages.

Excavations have uncovered examples of metalwork at Zaculeu. These were small ornamental pieces. An example is a representation of a butterfly worked from tumbaga, an alloy of gold and copper, dated to the Postclassic period.

=== Spanish conquest ===
Although hostilities existed between the Mam and the Kʼicheʼ of Qʼumarkaj after the rebellion of the Kaqchikel people against their Kʼicheʼ allies, the arrival of the Spanish conquistadors shifted the political landscape. Conquistador Pedro de Alvarado described how the Mam king Kayb'il B'alam was received with great honour in Qʼumarkaj.

At the time of the Spanish Conquest, the main Mam population was situated in Xinabahul (also spelled Chinabjul), now the city of Huehuetenango. They retreated to Zaculeu as a refuge during the Spanish attacks because of its fortifications. The refuge was attacked by Gonzalo de Alvarado y Contreras, brother of conquistador Pedro de Alvarado, in 1525, with 120 soldiers, and some 2,000 Mexican and Kʼicheʼ allies. The city was defended by Kayb'il B'alam commanding some 5,000 people (the chronicles are not clear if this is the number of soldiers or the total population of Zaculeu).

After a siege lasting several months, the Mam were reduced to starvation. Kayb'il B'alam finally surrendered the city to the Spanish in October 1525. When the Spanish entered the city, they found 1,800 dead Indians, with the survivors eating the corpses of the dead. The Spanish forced the abandonment of Zaculeu after they built the new city of Huehuetenango some 5 kilometres (3.1 mi) away.

=== Modern history ===
American explorer John Lloyd Stephens and English architect Frederick Catherwood visited the site in 1840, at which time it was a confused jumble of overgrown ruins. Stephens published a description of the archaeological remains a year later. Catherwood did not draw any of the structures due to the poor state of the remains. The two excavated one of the mounds and recovered some ceramic vessels, which Catherwood drew.

On 24 April 1931, Guatemala declared the site as a National Monument under the name of Tzaculeu. On 23 February 1946, the site was renamed as Zaculeu. The government gave a license to excavate to the United Fruit Company, which immediately began archaeological excavations and related restorations of the structures under the direction of John M. Dimick. American archaeologist Richard B. Woodbury was part of this excavation team, reporting progress updates in academic journals. The project later included re-coating a number of the buildings with white plaster, as it was known that many were originally finished that way. This has seldom been done in other restorations of Pre-Columbian buildings.

On 12 June 1970 the site was declared a National Precolumbian Monument by accord of the Guatemalan Ministry of Education (MINEDUC).

== Site description ==
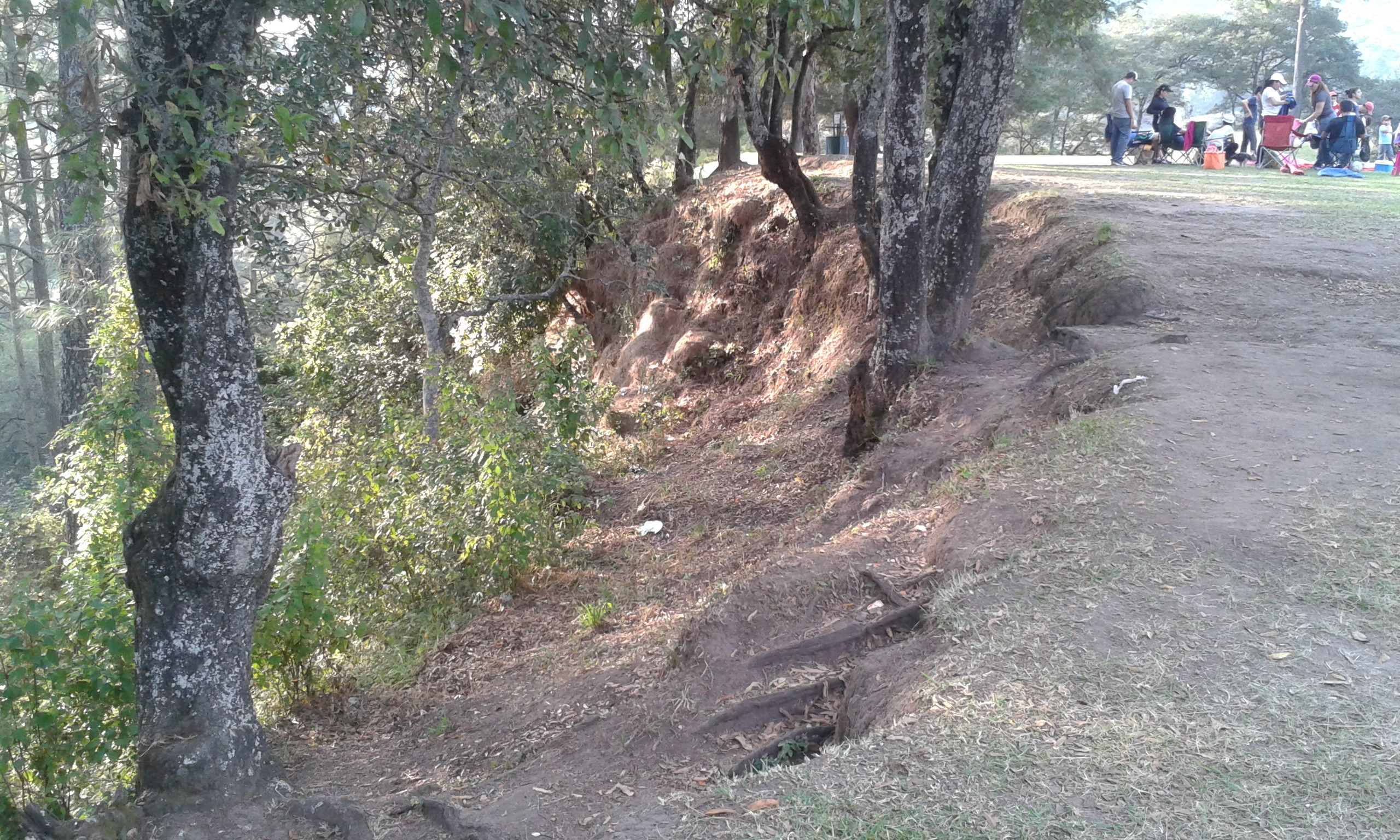
Ravine scarp defending the south side of the site

Zaculeu was likely originally developed because of its proximity to the Seleguá River, providing a permanent water supply and transportation waterway, together with its easily defensible hilltop location. Zaculeu has 43 structures. The majority of construction activity took place in one burst in the Early Classic, with minor alterations thereafter. The smaller platforms situated in the plazas were late additions; they show the influence of central Mexican civilization. The entrance to the site was via a narrow land bridge to the north, which was protected by a fortified structure that occupied three-quarters of the width of the land bridge.

The ceremonial centre of the city consisted of 43 structures clustered in an area of 1,400 square metres (15,000 sq ft). The architecture at the site includes talud-tablero style buildings with double stairways. The facades of some of the buildings have cylindrical columns, a feature found in other parts of Mesoamerica. Artefacts recovered from the site include items fashioned from turquoise and precious metals. The metal artefacts crafted from gold, silver and copper and their alloys demonstrate the city's participation in the wider trade networks of the Postclassic Period. These metal artefacts were either influenced by or imported from Mexico and southern Central America.

The structures at Zaculeu were grouped around small plazas and were generally built from masonry, coated with a thick layer of plaster. Fragments bear floral and geometric designs, indicating the structures were originally brightly painted. Stones were undressed and cemented in adobe mortar. No evidence of corbel vaulting has been found and very little in the way of stone sculpture. The architecture completely lacks stone sculpture. Burials from the Early Classic yielded a rich array of finds, but Late Classic burials were accompanied by a lesser variety of grave offerings.

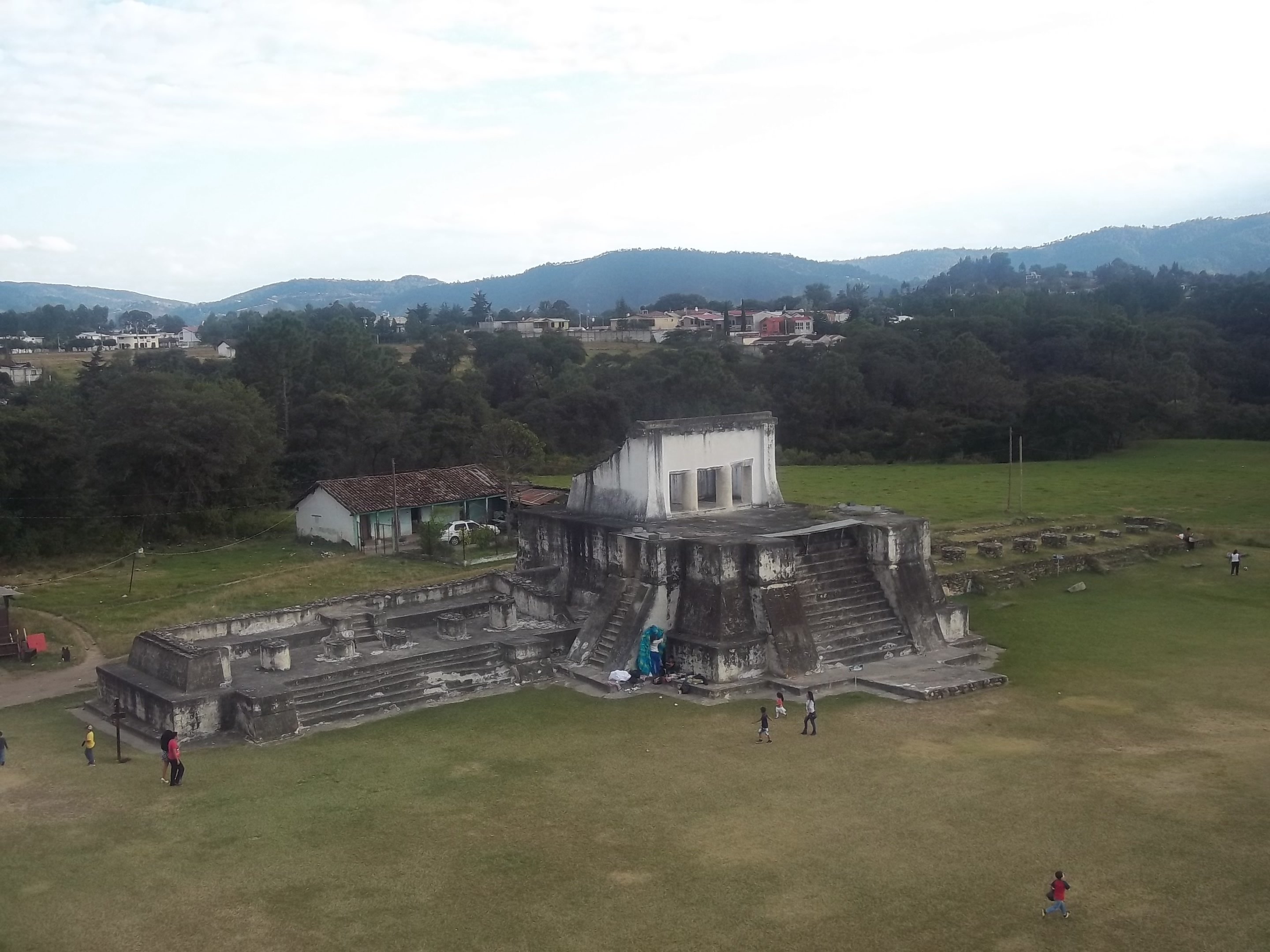
Structure 4, an unusual palace-temple combination

An Early Classic tomb was inserted under the main pyramid at Zaculeu; it had been tunnelled from the volcanic ash underlying the structure. A broad stairway descended to the tomb from the main plaza. The tomb interior was painted red and the floor was scattered with the remains of more than 100 ceramic vessels. These were crushed when the roof of the tomb collapsed. Also found were the remains of 34 pyrite mirrors of a type similar to those found at Kaminaljuyu. A sizeable quantity of jade was recovered from the tomb, including beads and earplugs. Some of the jade beads had been carved to represent human and parrot faces. The tomb contained the bones of four or more individuals. The ceramic offerings included decorated tripod vessels, polychrome bowls and a polychrome cylindrical vase that had a painted band of hieroglyphs. One ceramic bowl is painted in a negative painting style that is similar to finds from Nebaj.

The site core is laid out around eight plazas. Some of the structures were restored by the United Fruit Company; most of these border Plazas 1 and 2. Structures 1 and 2 are pyramid temples. Structures 4, 6 and 10 are palace structures, long buildings with internal chambers and benches used as residences and for administrative purposes.

=== Plazas ===
Plaza 1 is the main plaza at the site. It measures 54 by 38 metres (177 by 125 ft) and is closed on all four sides by pyramid temples.

Plaza 2 is a large plaza at the southeast of the site core, south of Plaza 1. It is bordered on the southeastern side by Structure 4, on the northeast by Structure 1, on the northwest by the ballcourt and on the southwest by Plaza 3.

Plaza 3 is a small plaza at the southern extreme of the site core, southwest of Plaza 2 and south of the ballcourt.

Plaza 4 is at the northwest side of the site core. It is closed on the northeastern side by Structure 10, on the southeast by Structure 13 and on the southwest by the ballcourt. Plazas 5 and 6 are located immediately to the west.

Plaza 5 is a small plaza immediately west of Plaza 4 and northwest of the ballcourt. It is divided from Plaza 6 to the northwest by Structure 21.

Plaza 6 is another small plaza to the west of Plaza 4. It is enclosed on three sides by a building complex with Structure 21 on the southeast side.

Plaza 7 is a small plaza at the western extreme of the site core, to the west of Plazas 5 and 6.

Plaza 8 is an enclosed plaza to the southwest of the ballcourt. Structure 2, a pyramid, closes the northwest side and Structure 3 closes the southeast side.

=== Structures ===
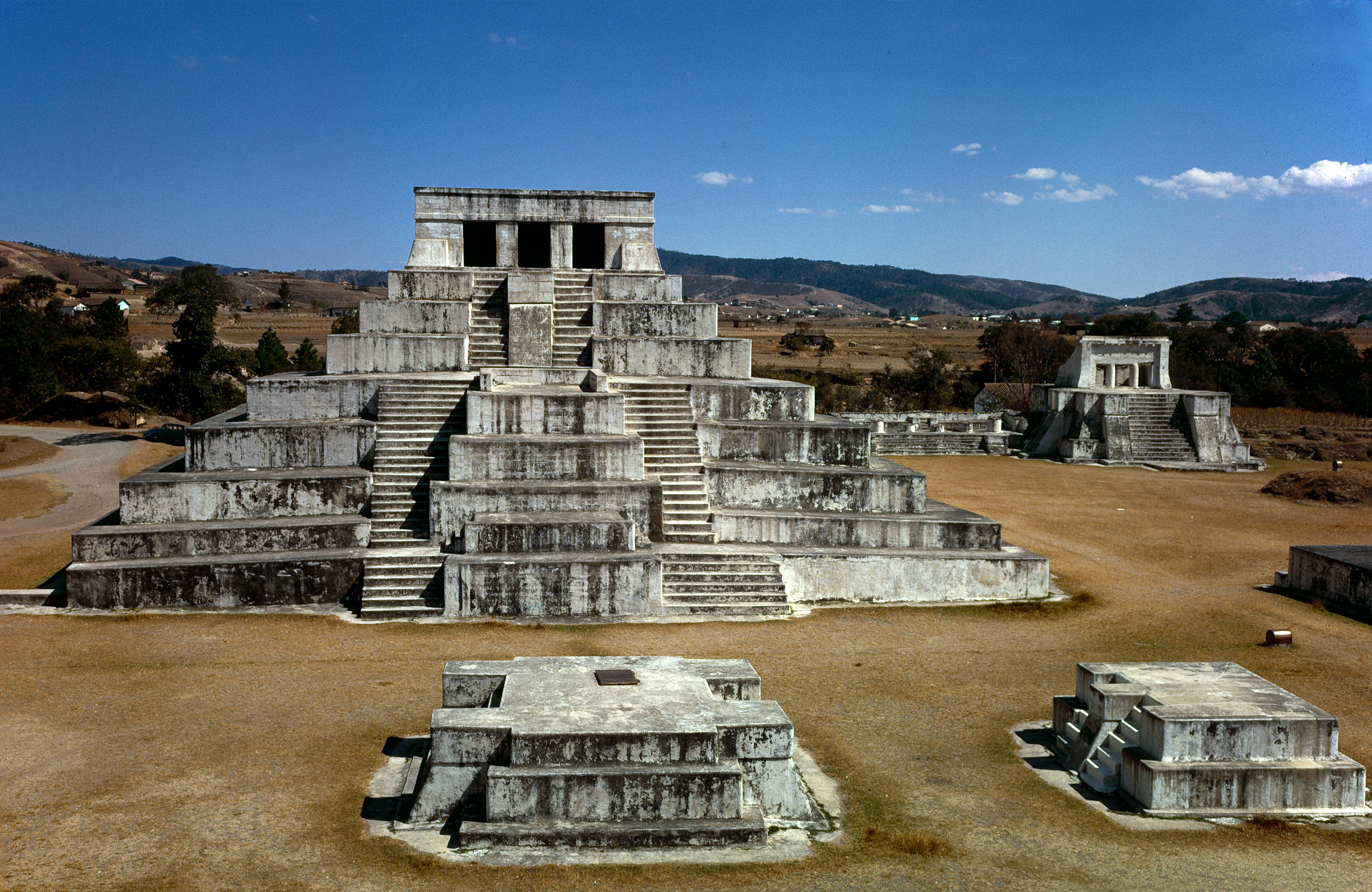
Structure 1, the main pyramid, dates to the Early Classic.

Structure 1 is a 39-foot (12 m) high pyramid on the southeast side of Plaza 1. It has eight stepped sections topped by a summit shrine. The shrine has three doorways approached via a double stairway rising from the plaza below. The pyramid was rebuilt seven times with the visible remains dating to the Early Postclassic. The earliest phase of construction dates to the Early Classic period.

Structure 2 is a pyramid on the northwest side of the sunken Plaza 8. It is largely unrestored. Structure 3 lies across the plaza to the southeast. It is a platform with a twin stairway facing northwest onto the plaza.

Structure 3 is on the southeast side of Plaza 8, facing onto the plaza opposite Structure 2. It is immediately south of the ballcourt.

Structure 4 is an unusual combination of temple and palace. It is situated on the southeast side of Plaza 2. The structure consists of a central pyramidal base flanked by two attached range structures. The pyramidal base is topped by a shrine containing three rooms, the final room of the three is circular. The temple has three steep stairways flanked by balustrades. The main stairway ascends directly from the plaza, those on either side are perpendicular to the main stairway. The balustrade of each stairway terminates at the top in a vertical panel. The temple facade is in good condition although the roof of the temple is missing. The range structures are unequal in size and each contains a single long room atop a low platform. The facade of each of these rooms once possessed a row of columns although only stumps remain in situ. This temple-palace is Kʼicheʼ in style and has been identified with the Nija'ib' lineage of the Kʼicheʼ, being very similar to the Temple of Awilix at Qʼumarkaj. A tomb was excavated in Structure 4, it consisted of a complete skeleton with associated offerings that included two tripod earthenware bowls, one with duck effigies, a tripod incense burner, a flint knife, nine obsidian knives, five jade beads and some fragments of gold.

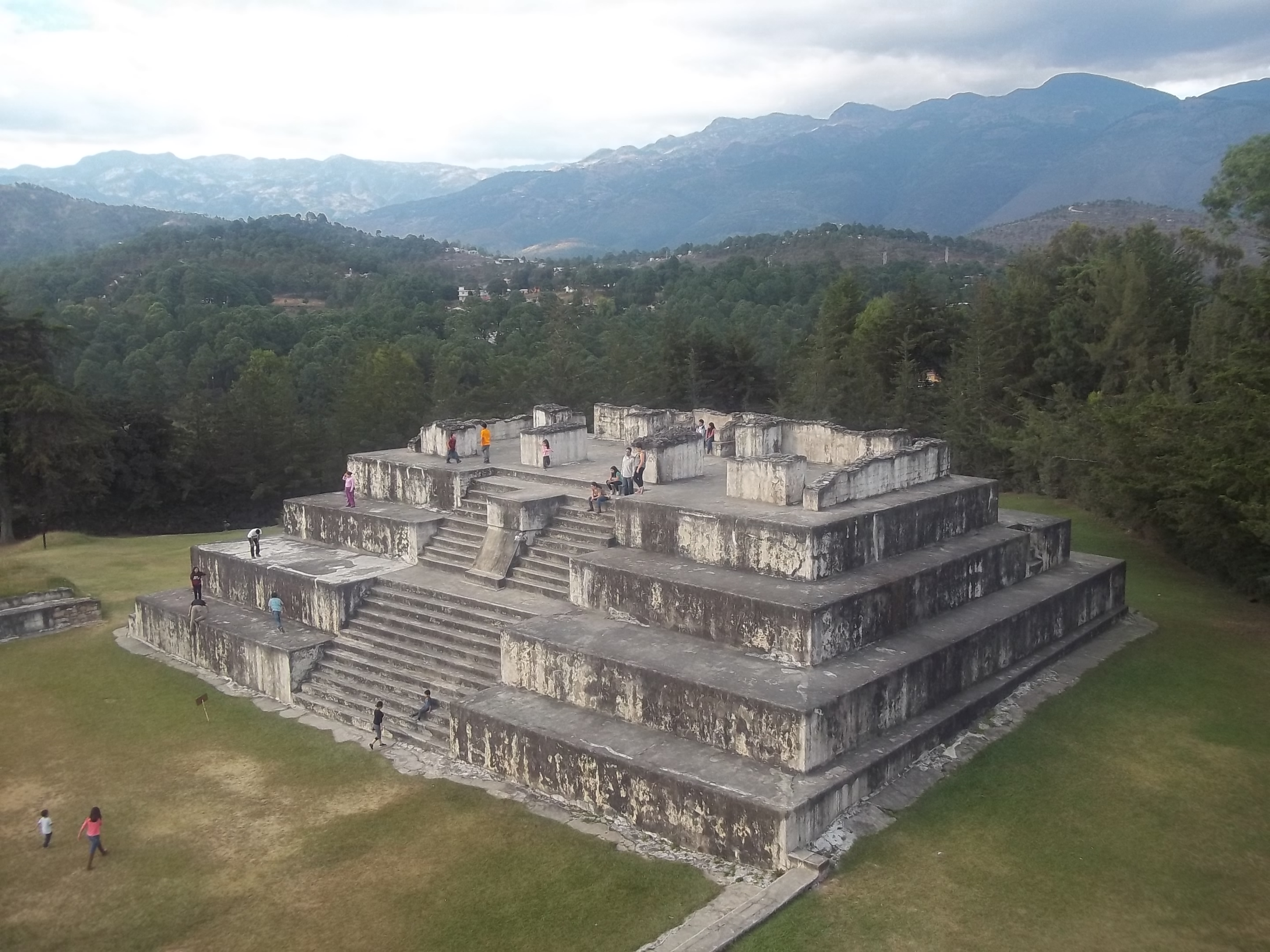
Structure 6 on Plaza 1

Structure 6 is a temple on the northeast side of Plaza 1. It rises in stepped sections topped by a summit shrine and was accessed via a stairway from the plaza that divided in two near the summit. Only the lower sections of the walls and columns of the shrine remain.

Structure 9 is a large mound on the northwest side of Plaza 1. The last phase of construction shows evidence of the interruption of construction by the Spanish Conquest. Terraces were absent on three sides of the structure with only the lowest level having been built on the fourth. Early Classic ceramic caches were discovered under Structure 9.

Structure 10 borders the northeast side of Plaza 4 and is unrestored although some original stonework is evident. It is a very long building accessed via three stairways ascending from the plaza. The structure has been investigated by archaeologists and was found to have multiple doorways opening into a single long room.

Structures 11 and 12 are small platforms in the middle of Plaza 1. They have both been restored.

Structure 13 is on the southwest side of Plaza 1, dividing that Plaza from Plaza 2. It was accessed via a double stairway ascending from Plaza 1. This double stairway gave access to the first level of the temple structure only; from there, a wide single stairway continued to the summit shrine. Only the lower sections of the walls and columns of the temple superstructure remain. The earliest phase of construction dates to the Early Classic and consisted of a low platform that supported a perishable superstructure.

Structures 15 and 16 are both low platforms located in Plaza 2, on an axis running directly northwest across the plaza from the central temple of Structure 4.

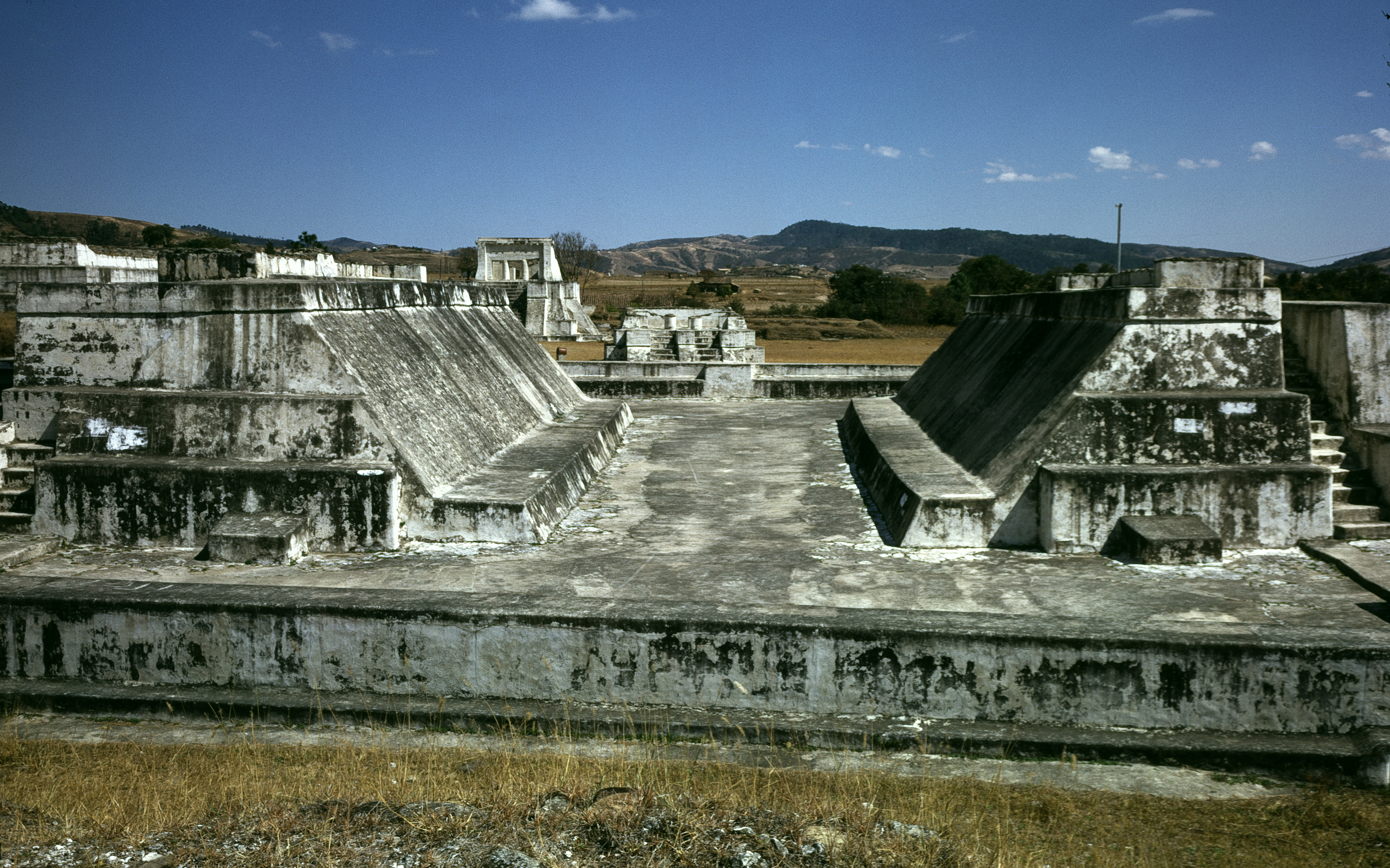
The ballcourt at Zaculeu

Structure 17 is a pyramidal base in Plaza 2, to the west of Structures 15 and 16. It supported two rooms accessed via a double stairway on the northwest side of the temple. The entrance to outermost room once had two columns, although now only the lower portions of the walls and columns remain.

Structure 21 is a low platform in Plaza 5, it is partially restored and has a stairway on the northwest side.

The Ballcourt consists of Structures 22 and 23, it was used for the ceremonial Mesoamerican ballgame. It is an I-shaped sunken ballcourt with sloping walls. The two structures forming the sides of the ballcourt once supported buildings, now only the lower sections of their walls remain. The ballcourt is oriented northwest to southeast and is 48 metres (157 ft) long.

Structure 37 is not associated with any of the eight plazas of the site core, standing about 50 metres (160 ft) northeast of Structure 4 and a similar distance east of Structure 1. It was investigated by archaeologists but has not been restored, although some of the original stonework and plaster coating is visible.

== See also ==
- Cerro Quiac
- Chajoma
- Iximche
- Mixco Viejo
