= San Juan Atitán =

Municipality in Huehuetenango Department, Guatemala

- Municipality
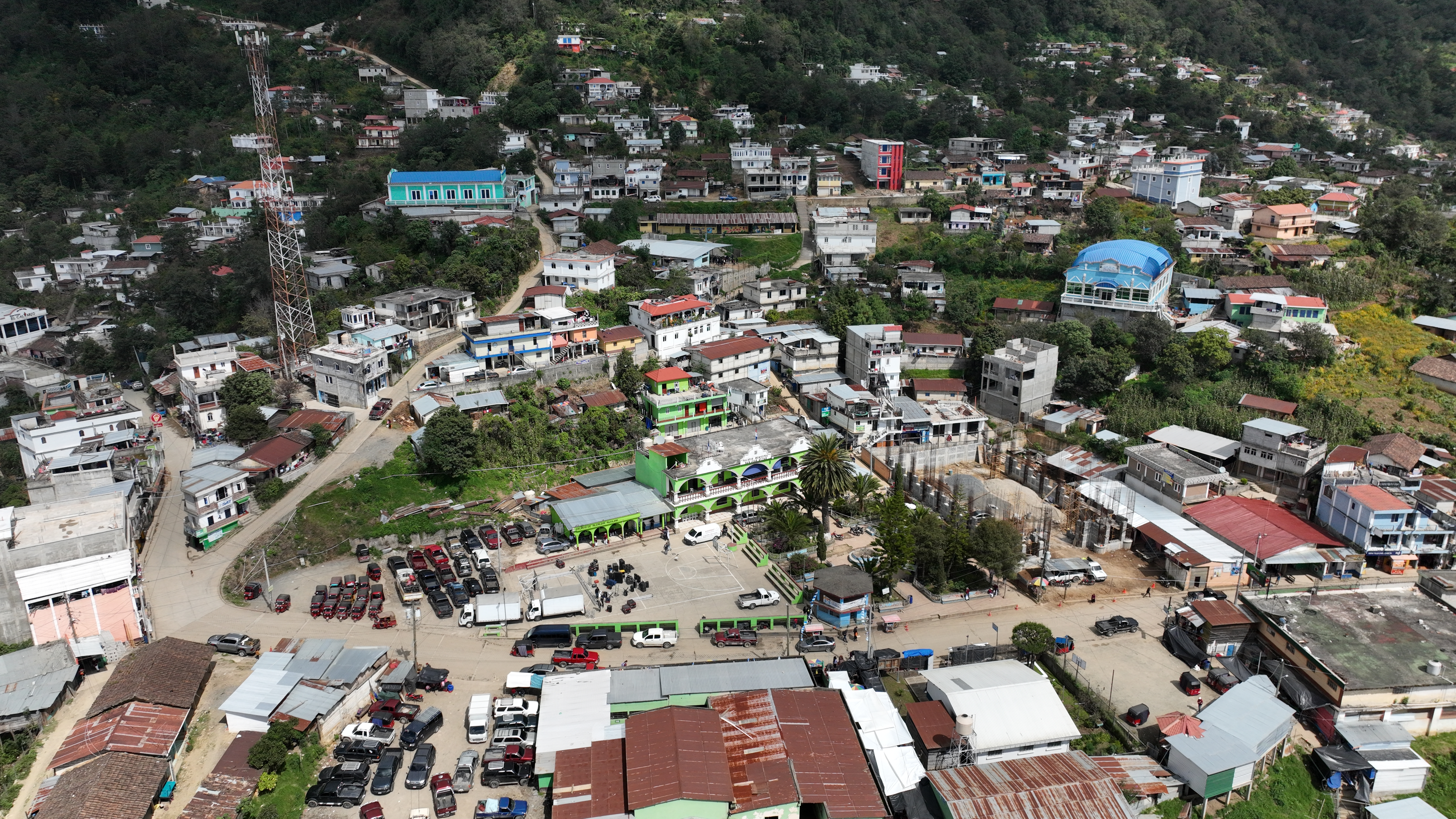
- Interactive map of San Juan Atitán
- Coordinates: 15°26′33″N 91°37′58″W
- Country: Guatemala
- Department: Huehuetenango

Population (2022)
  - Total: 26,031
- HDI (2018): 0.525
- HDI rank: 327th
- HDI category: Low

San Juan Atitán is a municipality in the Guatemalan department of Huehuetenango.
