= Santiago Chimaltenango =

Santiago Chimaltenango Chimb´al
- Municipality
- Location in Guatemala
- Coordinates: 15°18′53″N 91°28′34″W
- Country: Guatemala
- Department: Huehuetenango
- Municipality: Santiago Chimaltenango

Government
  - Mayor: Froylan Elías Aguilar Jiménez (Partido UNE)

Area
  - Municipality: 37.4 km^{2} (14.4 sq mi)
- Elevation: 1,901 m (6,237 ft)

Population (census 2018)
  - Municipality: 10,507
  - Density: 281/km^{2} (728/sq mi)
  - Urban: 5,841
  - Ethnicities: Mam Ladino
  - Religions: Roman Catholicism Evangelicalism Maya
- Time zone: UTC-6
- Postal code: 13030
- Area code: 502
- Climate: Cwb

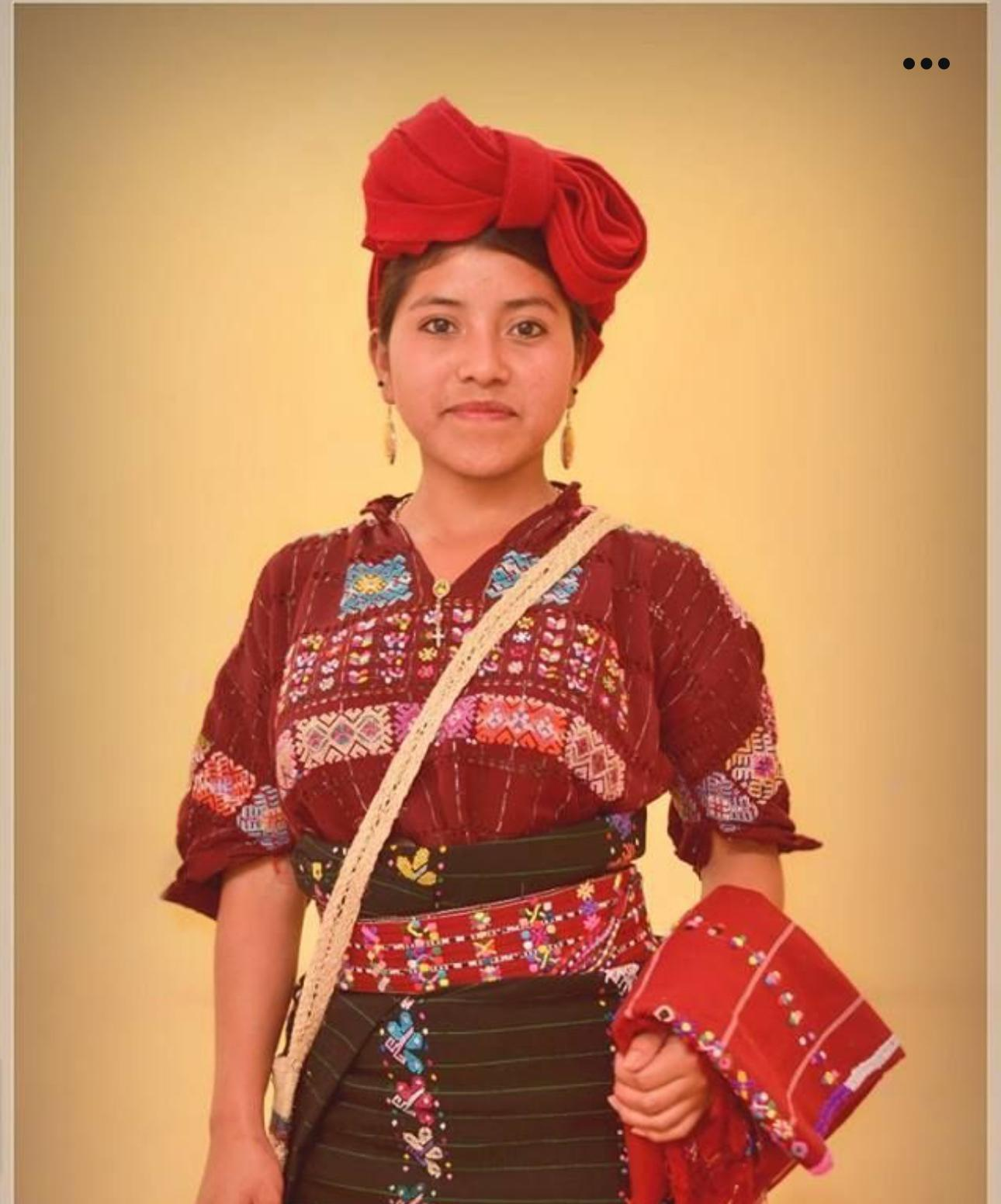
Traditional female dress of Santiago Chimaltenango, Huehuetenango Guatemala

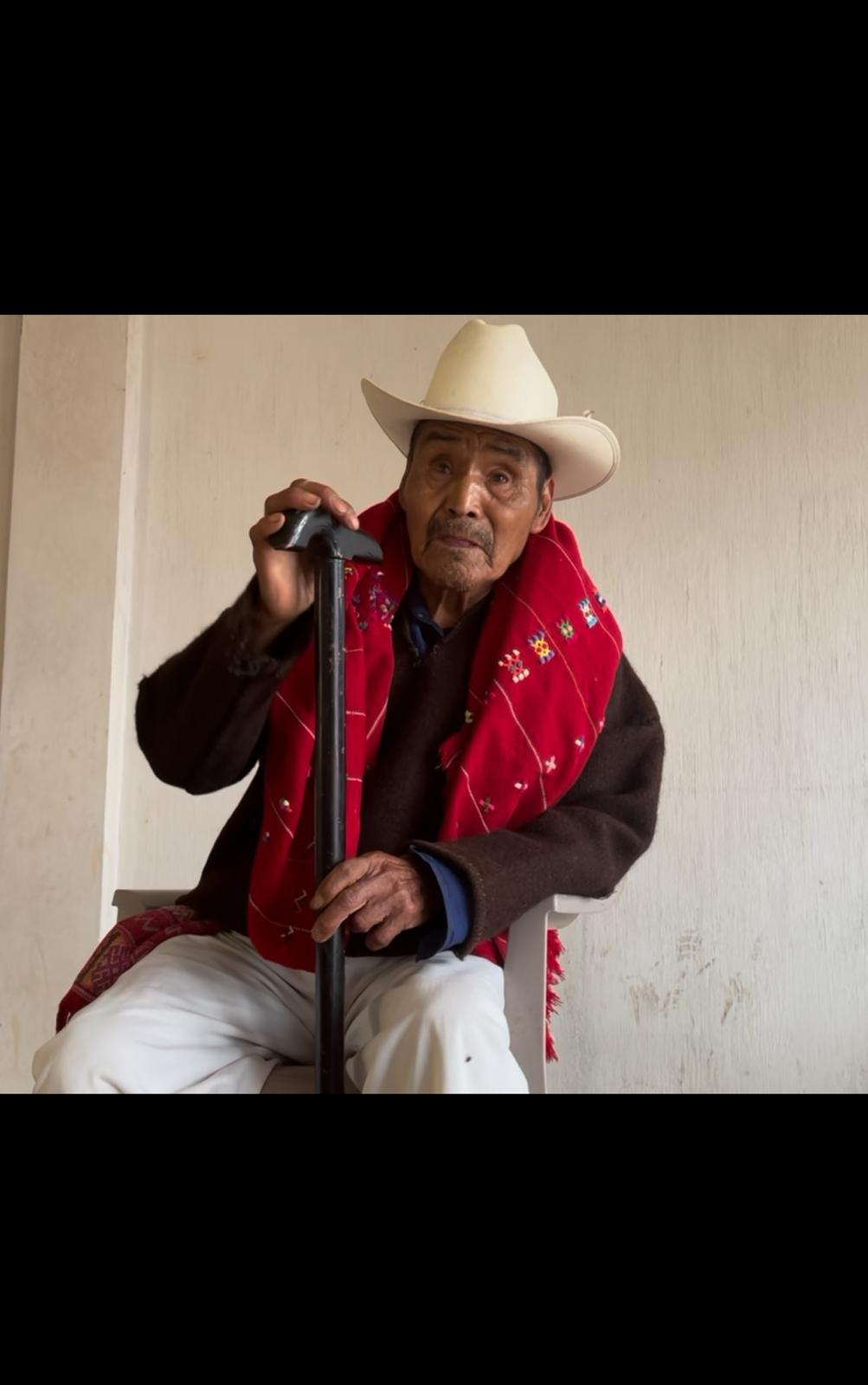
Male Traditional Dress from Santiago Chimaltenango Huehuetenango Guatemala

Santiago Chimaltenango is a town and municipality in the Guatemalan department of Huehuetenango. The municipality is named in honor of the Apostle St James. The annual festivals (fiestas patronales) are from July 21st to July 25th. It is estimated that roughly 10% of the population is abroad, mainly in the American states of California and Florida. The cities of Oakland and Los Angeles having the largest populations. The Mam people are the predominant people in the municipality. The Mam language is widely spoken in it.

== History ==
The municipality was annulled on December 11, 1935, and reestablished on February 2, 1948.

The predominant language is mam. Specificity the Northern Mam.(Diccionario Municipal de Guatemala, 2001).

== Government ==
The current mayor of the municipality for the 2020-2024 cycle is Froylan Elías Aguilar Jiménez (Partido UNE).

== Education ==
Escuela Nacional Urbana Mixta Santiago Chimaltenango

== Economy ==
The production of agriculture of the municipality includes corn, beans, potatoes, coffee, sugar cane and bananas (Diccionario Municipal de Guatemala, 2001).

Its production of local artisanal wears include cotton and wool (Diccionario Municipal de Guatemala, 2001).

== Geography ==
The municipality is bound to the north by the municipalities of Concepción and Todos Santos Cuchumatán. To the east by the municipality of San Juan Atitán. To the south is the municipality Colotenango and then the west with the municipalities of Colotenango and San Pedro Nécta.

It is located about 317 km from the capital of Guatemala City.

The weather is cool and moderate.

== Places of Interest ==
- Iglesia Santiago Apóstol
- Parque Central
- Casa de la Cultura http://www.casadelacultura.org

== Tourism ==
In the municipality is the archeological site of Tecpán. Also the tourist site of the Balñeario La Laguna (La Laguna Waterpark)

(Diccionario Municipal de Guatemala, 2001).

== Demographics ==
According to projections by the “Instituto Nacional de Estadística“ for the year 2012, The municipality of Santiago Chimaltenango has a population of 7,250 inhabitants.

== Traditional music ==
The area has its own distinct type of marimba music.

Marimba of Casa de la Cultura
