= Jakaltek people =

Mayan people of Guatemala

Jakaltek
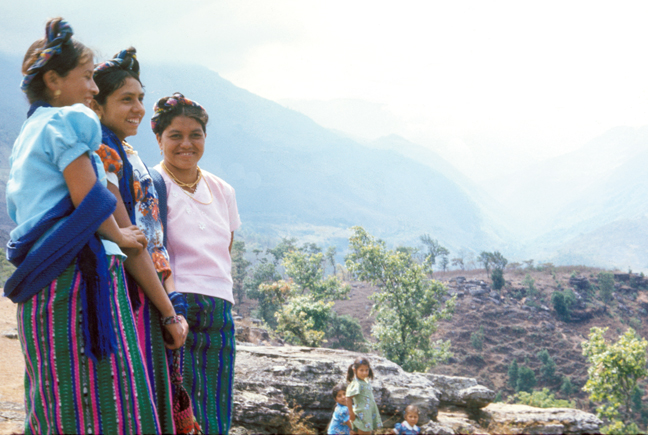

Total population
- c. 65,000

Regions with significant populations
- Guatemala: 54,237
- Mexico: 480 (2020)

Languages
- Jakaltek (Poptí), Spanish

Religion
- Roman Catholic, Evangelicalist, Maya religion

Related ethnic groups
- Kanjobal - (Maya peoples)

The Jakaltek people are a Maya people who lives alongside the border of the State of Chiapas in southern Mexico and the Department of Huehuetenango in northwestern Guatemala. Since pre-Columbian times they have lived alongside the modern Mexico-Guatemala border near the foothills of the Cuchumatán Mountains, mainly centered on the municipality of Jacaltenango.

The name Jakaltek comes from the Nahuatl language meaning “people of the jacal”.

== Language ==
The Jakaltek language also known as Popti' is a Mayan language from the Q'anjobalan branch closely related to the Akatek and Q'anjob'al languages.

== Location and history ==
Located on a plateau overlooking Mexico, Jacaltenango is 1,437 m above sea level and its surrounding villages are located at both higher and lower elevations. The town of Jacaltenango is a governmental, religious, and market center of the region. In the Jakaltek language the town of Jacaltenango is called "Xajlaj", or “place of the big white rock slabs.”

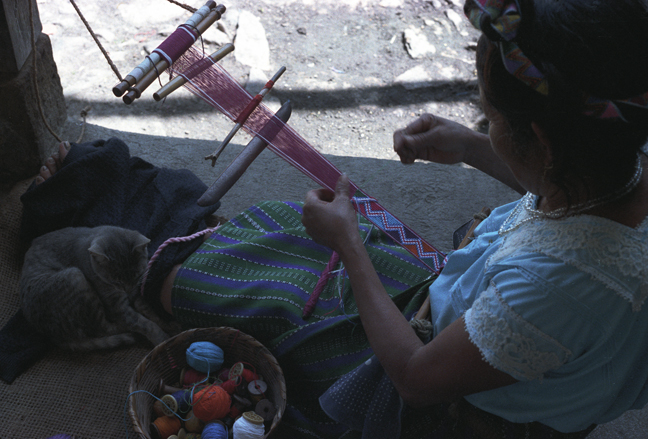
Jakaltek Maya brocading a hair sash on a backstrap loom.

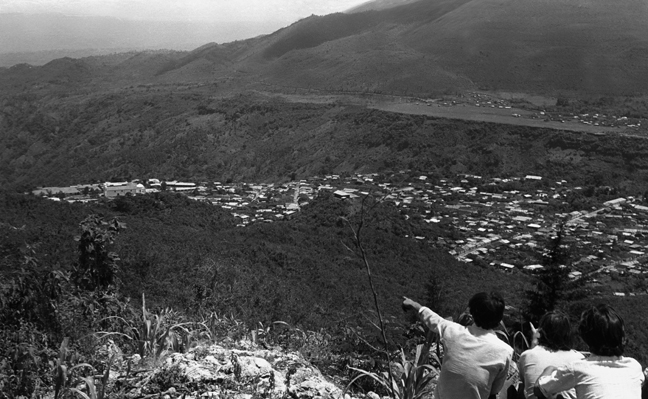
View of Jacaltenango and San Marcos beyond.

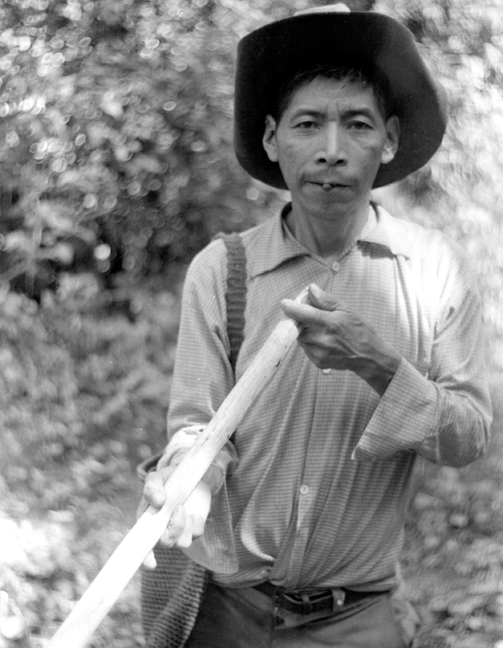
A Jakaltek holds a clay pellet between his lips as he prepares to insert it into his blowgun in Guatemala.

For many years, this area was physically and culturally the most remote from Spanish centers in the country. The 72-km trip from Huehuetenango, the capital of the department, was a two-day walk. Since 1974, when an unpaved road was built from the Pan-American Highway to Jacaltenango, it has been a five-hour bus ride from Huehuetenango to Jacaltenango. Electricity came to town in 1979. This relative isolation has resulted in the preservation of many customs in the community which have been lost elsewhere. For example, a few Jakaltek people still use the blowgun for hunting small animals and birds. The Jakaltek also maintain a belief system which involves Naguals and Tonals.

There is a sizable Jacalteco population in South Florida, specifically in Jupiter which is where most Jacaltecos in the United States live, as well as Indiantown (where most Guatemalans first settled in Florida), West Palm Beach, Lake Worth (home to the largest Guatemalan Maya community in Florida), and Homestead.
