= San Sebastián Huehuetenango =

Coordinates: 15°23′N 91°35′W

San Sebastián Huehuetenango is a municipality in the Guatemalan department of Huehuetenango. It is located approximately 27 km. north of the city of Huehuetenango on Inter-American Highway heading toward the Mexican border at La Mesilla. The language spoken is Mayan Mam. The majority of the inhabitants are subsistence farmers.
