= Academia de Lenguas Mayas de Guatemala =

- Abbreviation: ALMG
- Formation: 16 November 1990; 35 years ago
- Location: Guatemala City, Guatemala
- Website: Official website

The Academia de Lenguas Mayas de Guatemala, or ALMG (English: Guatemalan Academy of Mayan Languages) is a Guatemalan organisation that regulates the use of the 22 Mayan languages spoken within the borders of the republic. It has expended particular efforts on standardising the various writing systems used. Another of its functions is to promote Mayan culture, which it does by providing courses in the country's various Mayan languages and by training Spanish-Mayan interpreters.

It was founded on 16 November 1990 as an autonomous state organization, following publication of the Ley de la Academia de Lenguas Mayas de Guatemala, which had been passed by Congress the previous October.

== Orthography ==
The ALMG have developed the most widely used orthographies for the Mayan languages. The Mayan languages in Mexico use different orthographies developed by INALI.

ALMG orthography for the phonemes of Mayan languages
Vowels						Consonants									
ALMG	IPA	ALMG	IPA	ALMG	IPA	ALMG	IPA	ALMG	IPA	ALMG	IPA	ALMG	IPA	ALMG	IPA
a	[a]	aa	[aː]	ä	[ɐ]	bʼ	[ɓ]	b	[b]	ch	[t͡ʃ]	chʼ	[t͡ʃʼ]	h	[h]
e	[e]	ee	[eː]	ë	[ɛ]	j	[χ]	k	[k]	kʼ	[kʼ]	l	[l]	m	[m]
i	[i]	ii	[iː]	ï	[ɪ]	n	[n]	nh	[ŋ]	p	[p]	q	[q]	qʼ	[qʼ]
o	[o]	oo	[oː]	ö	[ɤ̞]	r	[r]	s	[s]	t	[t]	tʼ	[tʼ]	tz	[t͡s]
u	[u]	uu	[uː]	ü	[ʊ]	tzʼ	[t͡sʼ]	w	[w]	x	[ʃ]	y	[j]	ʼ	[ʔ]
In tonal languages (primarily Yucatec), a high tone is indicated with an accent, as with "á" or "ée".

For the languages that make a distinction between palato-alveolar and retroflex affricates and fricatives (Mam, Ixil, Tektitek, Awakatek, Qʼanjobʼal, Poptiʼ, and Akatek in Guatemala, and Yucatec in Mexico) the ALMG suggests the following set of conventions.

ALMG convention for palato-alveolar and retroflex consonants
ALMG	IPA	ALMG	IPA	ALMG	IPA
ch	[tʃ]	chʼ	[tʃʼ]	xh	[ʃ]
tx	[tʂ]	txʼ	[tʂʼ]	x	[ʂ]

== Languages ==
The 22 languages regulated by the ALMG are Achi, Akatek, Awakatek, Chalchitek (sometimes considered a dialect of Awakatek), Ch’orti’, Chuj, Itza’, Ixil, Jakaltek, Kaqchikel, K’iche’, Mam, Mopan, Poqomam, Poqomchi’, Q’anjob’al, Q’eqchi’, Sakapultek, Sipakapense, Tektitek, Tz’utujil, and Uspantek.
