= Colotenango =

- Municipality

- Location in Guatemala
- Coordinates: 15°24′17″N 91°42′50″W
- Country: Guatemala
- Department: Huehuetenango

Government
  - Mayor: Aroldo Ríos (UNE)

Area
  - Municipality: 62 km^{2} (24 sq mi)

Population (2018 census)
  - Municipality: 34,834
  - Density: 560/km^{2} (1,500/sq mi)
  - Urban: 5,132
- Climate: Cwb

Colotenango is a town and municipality in the Guatemalan department of Huehuetenango. The municipality is situated at 1,590 m (5,220 ft) above sea level and has a population of 34,834 (2018 census). It covers an area of 62 km^{2} (24 sq mi). The annual festival is August 12–15.

Colotenango has two holy sites called Tuikalajan and Tuisanmarcos.

== Demographics ==
Colotenango is traditionally a Maya community whose residents speak the Mayan Mam language. Two-thirds of the residents are Catholic, while about thirty percent are Evangelica.

== Aldeas ==
Colotenango includes the following aldeas (towns), Colotenango (el pueblo), Canton Morales, El Granadillo, Ical, Ixconlaj, La Barranca, La Vega, Tojlate, Luminoche, Tixel, and Xemal.
