= Jacaltenango =

- Municipality
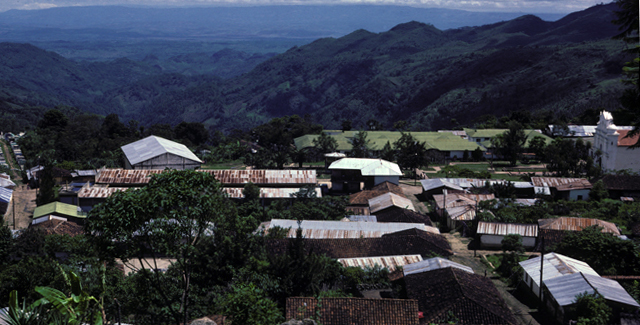
- View of Jacaltenango in 1986

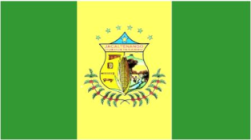
- Flag

- Location in Guatemala
- Coordinates: 15°40′N 91°44′W
- Country: Guatemala
- Department: Huehuetenango
- Municipality: Jacaltenango

Area
  - Municipality: 87 sq mi (225 km^{2})
- Elevation: 4,715 ft (1,437 m)

Population (Census 2018)
  - Municipality: 37,171
  - Density: 428/sq mi (165/km^{2})
  - Urban: 22,533
  - Ethnicities: Jakaltek Ladino
  - Religions: Roman Catholicism Evangelicalism Maya
- Climate: Cwb

Jacaltenango is a town and municipality situated in the Western Highlands of Guatemala. It is located in a valley surrounded by the Sierra Madre Mountains. Jacaltenango serves as the municipal seat for the surrounding municipality of the same name. In 2002, its urban population was about 23,500 but at the 2018 census the town's population has decreased to 22,533.

Its economy is based mainly on agricultural products, especially coffee. Jacaltenango exports about 95% of its agricultural production. Jacaltenango has six schools: three elementary and three high schools, which include middle school.

== History ==
After the Spanish conquest of Guatemala in the 1520s, the "Presentación de Guatemala" Mercedarian province was formed in 1565; originally, the order of the Blessed Virgin Mary of Mercy had gotten from bishop Francisco Marroquín several doctrines in the Sacatepéquez and Chimaltenango valleys, close to the capital Santiago de los Caballeros de Guatemala, but they traded those with friars of the Order of Preachers in exchange for the doctrines those had in the Sierra de los Cuchumatanes area. During the first part of the 17th century they also had doctrine in four towns close to the city of Santiago, which eventually became city neighborhoods: Espíritu Santo, Santiago, San Jerónimo and San Anton —which was the capital of the Mercedarians, where they had their convent and where their comendador lived.

According to bishop Juan de las Cabezas' memoir in 1613 and the bishop Pedro Cortés y Larraz parish visit minutes from 1770, the Mercedarians came to have nine doctrines, and numerous annexes, which were: Santa Ana de Malacatán, Concepción de Huehuetenango, San Pedro de Solomá, Nuestra Señora de la Purificación de Jacaltenango, Nuestra Señora de la Candelaria de Chiantla, San Andrés de Cuilco, Santiago de Tejutla, San Pedro de Sacatepéquez, and San Juan de Ostuncalco.

However, in 1754, due to the borbon reforms implemented by the Spanish kings, the Mercedarins - and the rest of the regular clergy for that matter - had to transfer their doctrines to the secular clergy, thus losing their Jacaltaenango convent and annexed doctrines.

Much of its population lives abroad, mainly in Indiantown, Jupiter, West Palm Beach, and Lake Worth Florida, where there is a large community of Guatemalan Mayas. Some of those who migrated to Jupiter in Palm Beach County seasonally live in Morganton in the mountains of North Carolina.

== Climate ==
Jacaltenango has a subtropical highland climate (Köppen: Cwb).

Climate data for Jacaltenango
| Month | Jan | Feb | Mar | Apr | May | Jun | Jul | Aug | Sep | Oct | Nov | Dec | Year |
|---|---|---|---|---|---|---|---|---|---|---|---|---|---|
| Mean daily maximum °C (°F) | 25.1 (77.2) | 25.8 (78.4) | 27.3 (81.1) | 28.5 (83.3) | 27.4 (81.3) | 26.4 (79.5) | 25.6 (78.1) | 26.2 (79.2) | 25.6 (78.1) | 24.9 (76.8) | 25.1 (77.2) | 24.8 (76.6) | 26.1 (78.9) |
| Daily mean °C (°F) | 17.9 (64.2) | 18.3 (64.9) | 19.5 (67.1) | 20.9 (69.6) | 20.3 (68.5) | 20.4 (68.7) | 19.6 (67.3) | 19.9 (67.8) | 19.7 (67.5) | 19.1 (66.4) | 18.7 (65.7) | 18.1 (64.6) | 19.4 (66.9) |
| Mean daily minimum °C (°F) | 10.7 (51.3) | 10.8 (51.4) | 11.7 (53.1) | 13.3 (55.9) | 13.3 (55.9) | 14.5 (58.1) | 13.6 (56.5) | 13.7 (56.7) | 13.9 (57.0) | 13.4 (56.1) | 12.3 (54.1) | 11.4 (52.5) | 12.7 (54.9) |
| Average precipitation mm (inches) | 48 (1.9) | 18 (0.7) | 21 (0.8) | 65 (2.6) | 145 (5.7) | 563 (22.2) | 431 (17.0) | 357 (14.1) | 523 (20.6) | 363 (14.3) | 104 (4.1) | 63 (2.5) | 2,701 (106.5) |
Source: Climate-Data.org

== Geographic location ==
Jacaltenango is surrounded by Huehuetenango Department municipalities:

== Gallery ==
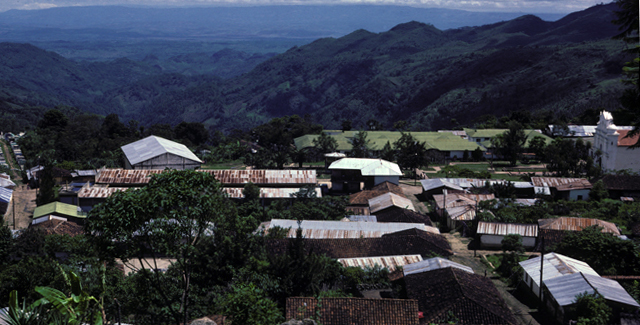
View of Jacaltenango from the Hermita San Sebastian (1986).

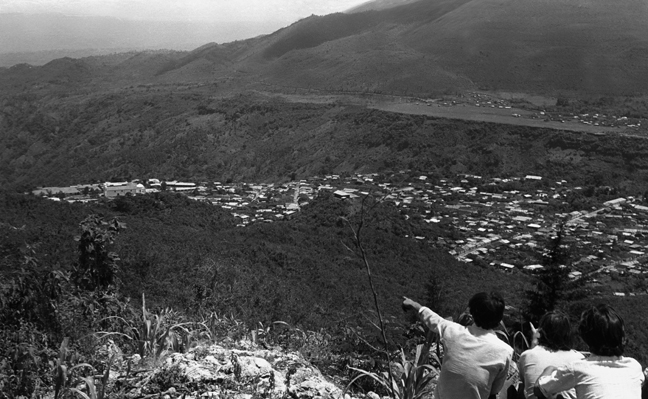
View of Jacaltenango and San Marcos beyond.

== See also ==
- List of places in Guatemala

== Notes and references ==
=== Bibliography ===
- Cortés y Larraz, Pedro (1770). Descripción Geográfico-Moral de la Diócesis de Goathemala (in Spanish). Guatemala: Diócesis de Guatemala.
- Juarros, Domingo (1818). Compendio de la historia de la Ciudad de Guatemala (in Spanish). Guatemala: Ignacio Beteta.
- Pérez, Pedro Nolasco O. de M. (1966). Historia de las Misiones Mercedarias en América (in Spanish). Madrid.
