= San Gaspar Ixchil =

Coordinates: 15°23′N 91°43′W

San Gaspar Ixchil is a municipality in the Guatemalan department of Huehuetenango.
