= Akatek language =

Mayan language spoken in Mexico and Guatemala

Akatek
- Acateco, Western Kanjobal
- Kuti', q'anub'al'
- Native to: Guatemala; Mexico
- Region: Huehuetenango; Chiapas
- Ethnicity: 66,000 Akateko in Guatemala (2019 census)
- Native speakers: 65,000 in Guatemala (2011 – 2019 census); 2,900 in Mexico (2020 census)
- Language family: Mayan: Qʼanjobalan–Chujean; Qʼanjobalan; Kanjobal–Jacaltec; Akatek
- Writing system: Latin

Official status
- Recognised minority language in: Mexico; Guatemala
- Regulated by: Instituto Nacional de Lenguas Indígenas; Academia de Lenguas Mayas de Guatemala

Language codes
- ISO 639-3: knj Western Kanjobal
- Glottolog: west2635
- ELP: Akateko

Akatek is a Mayan language spoken by the Akateko people primarily in the Huehuetenango Department, Guatemala in and around the municipalities of Concepción Huista, Nentón, San Miguel Acatán, San Rafael La Independencia and San Sebastián Coatán. A number of speakers also live in Chiapas, Mexico. It is a living language with 58,600 speakers in 1998, of which 48,500 live in Guatemala and the remaining in Mexico. Alternate spellings for the language include Akatec, Akateko, and Akateco.

Huehuetenango Department highlighted in red on a map of Guatemala

Akateko stems from the Q'anjob'alan branch, making it closely related to Q’anjob’al and Chuj.

== History ==
Akateko was regarded as a dialect of the Qʼanjobʼal language until the 1970s, when linguists realized that it has a distinct grammar from that of Qʼanjobʼal. That it has been thought a dialect of Qʼanjobʼal is reflected in the many names Akateko has had through time. One of its primary names before it was named Akateko was Ti Western Qʼanjobʼal, but it has also been called Conob and various names including Qʼanjobʼal and the municipality where it is spoken.

== Phonology ==
=== Vowels ===
Akatek has 5 vowel qualities, each having both a short and long phoneme:

	Front	Back
Close	i iː	u uː
Close-mid	e eː	o oː
Open	a aː	

Vowel length is distinctive. These long vowels are a unique and recent sound change from Q'anjob'al.

=== Consonants ===
Akatek has 24 consonants:

		Bilabial	Alveolar	Palatal (-alveolar)	Retroflex	Velar	Uvular	Glottal
Nasal		m	n					
Plosive	pulmonic	p	t			k	q	ʔ ⟨’⟩
Plosive	glottalic	ɓ ⟨bʼ⟩	tʼ			kʼ	qʼ	
Affricate	plain		t͡s ⟨tz⟩	t͡ʃ ⟨ch⟩	ʈ͡ʂ ⟨tx⟩			
Affricate	ejective		t͡sʼ ⟨tzʼ⟩	t͡ʃʼ ⟨chʼ⟩	ʈ͡ʂʼ ⟨txʼ⟩			
Fricative			s	ʃ ⟨xh⟩	ʂ ⟨x⟩	x ⟨j⟩		
Approximant		w	l	j ⟨y⟩				
Tap			ɾ ⟨r⟩					

- /p/ is realized as [pʰ] word-finally, [p] elsewhere: pom [pom] 'copal', xopan [ʃopan] 'hollow', sip [sipʰ] 'tick'
- /k/ is realized as [kʰ] word-finally, [k] elsewhere: kaapʼ [kaːɓ̥] 'two', mooke [moːke] 'tinaja', chʼok [t͡ʃʼokʰ] 'zanate'
- /t/ is realized as [tʰ] before plosives, [t] elsewhere: teʼ [teʔ] 'tree', satkan [satʰkan] 'sky', pʼit [ɓit] 'song'
- /ɓ/ is realized as [ɓ̥] word-finally, [ɓ] elsewhere: kaapʼ [kaːɓ̥] 'two', pʼeyʼpʼal [ɓejɓal] 'the walking (thing)'
- /x/ is realized as [h] word-initially, [x] elsewhere: xos [hos] 'egg', ajane [ʔaxane] 'foot'
- /n/ is realized as [m] before /p/ and /ɓ/, as [ŋ] before alveolars and velars, and [n] elsewhere: inpʼit [imɓit] 'my song', ante [ʔaŋte] 'to cure', naa [naː] 'house'

== Grammar ==
An interesting aspect of Akateko grammar, which is also present in most other Qʼanjobalan languages, is the use of directional morphemes, which appear as enclitics. These morphemes make it possible for the speaker to talk about movement and direction in space without pointing or using other gestures. Consider the stative verb [ʔej] to be, which can appear as [ʔejʔok] existing inwards, [ʔejtok] existing towards there, away from the speaker and listener and [ʔeːltox] existing from the inside out, using different enclitics.

Standard verb roots are classified in multiple categories at once.

=== Classifiers ===
Akateko, Q’anjob’al and Chuj all utilize similar classifiers to organize nouns. Nouns are divided into three categories: humans, animals and inanimate objects and there is no generic classifier.

Akatek has 14 nominal classifiers.
