= Laguna Brava =

Karstic lake in Guatemala

- Yolnabaj
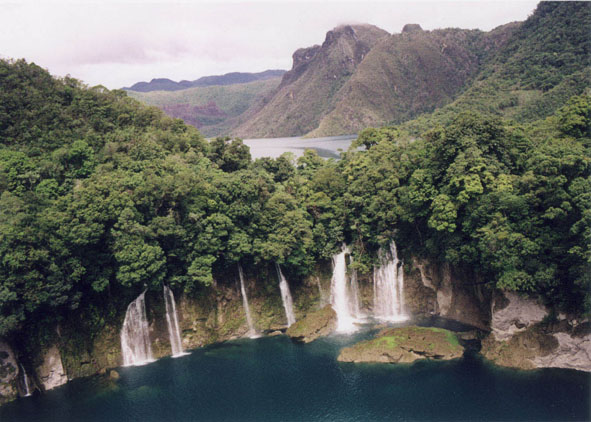

- Location within Guatemala
- Location: Nentón
- Coordinates: 16°03′00″N 91°34′00″W
- Type: Karstic lake
- Primary inflows: Río Yalacastán
- Basin countries: Guatemala
- Max. length: 6 km (3.7 mi)
- Max. width: 1.2 km (0.75 mi)
- Surface area: 3.8 km^{2} (1.5 sq mi)
- Surface elevation: 1,142 m (3,747 ft)

Laguna Brava (Spanish, 'wild' or 'rough lake', Spanish pronunciation: [laˈɣuna ˈβɾaβa]), also known as Yolnabaj, is a karstic lake in Guatemala. It is situated in the municipality of Nentón (Huehuetenango), close to the border with Mexico. The lake is fed by several streams and subterraneous watercourses.

The area around Laguna Brava has been inhabited by Mayan communities of the Chuj ethnicity since the 19th century. In the year 2000 a conflict over land usage emerged between indigenous communities depending on the land, and the American owners that just acquired it in order to transform it into a nature reserve.

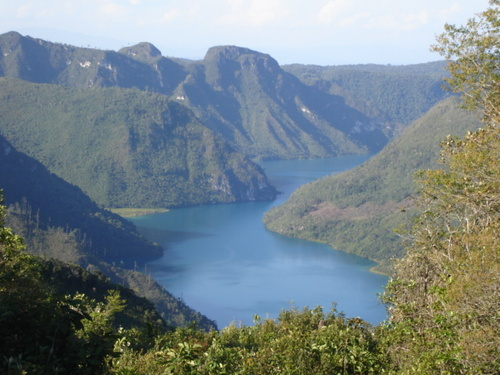
Yolnabaj lake

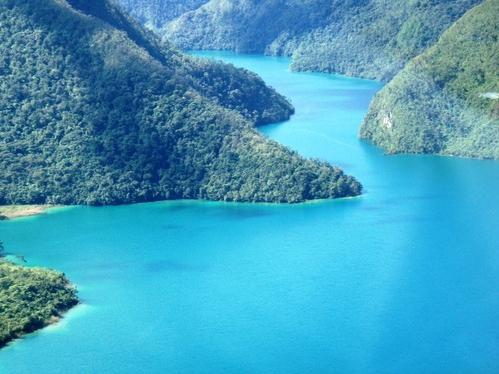
