= San Rafael Petzal =

Coordinates: 15°25′N 91°40′W

San Rafael Petzal (Spanish pronunciation: [san rafaˈel peˈtsal]) is a municipality in the Guatemalan department of Huehuetenango. According to the 2018 Census, it was home to 11,271 residents.
