= Akatek people =

Akatek
Total population
- 65,965

Regions with significant populations

Languages
- Akatek, Spanish

Religion
- Christianity (Majority Catholic, with Eastern or Oriental Orthodox and Evangelicalist minorities), Maya religion

Related ethnic groups
- Maya people

The Akatek (Akateko) are a Maya people of Guatemala. Their Indigenous Akatek language belongs to the Q'anjobalan branch of Mayan languages. Most Akatek live in San Miguel Acatán and San Rafael La Independencia, in the department of Huehuetenango.
