= La Libertad, Huehuetenango =

La Libertad
- Municipality
- Location in Guatemala
- Coordinates: 15.5°N 91.8333°W
- Country: Guatemala
- Department: Huehuetenango

Government
  - Mayor: Vacant

Area
  - Municipality: 231 km^{2} (89 sq mi)

Population (2018 census)
  - Municipality: 38,234
  - Density: 166/km^{2} (429/sq mi)
  - Urban: 6,216
- Climate: Aw

La Libertad (Spanish pronunciation: [la liβeɾˈtað]) is a town and municipality in the Guatemalan department of Huehuetenango. It is situated at 1720 metres above sea level. The municipality has a population of 38,234 (2018 census) and covers an area of 231 km^{2}.
