= Santa Ana Huista =

Coordinates: 15°41′N 91°49′W

Santa Ana Huista (Spanish pronunciation: [ˈsanta ˈana ˈwista]) is a municipality in the Guatemalan department of Huehuetenango.
