= San Miguel Acatán =

Guatemalan municipality in Huehuetenango

- Municipality
- Location within Guatemala
- Coordinates: 15°42′19″N 91°35′53″W
- Country: Guatemala
- Department: Huehuetenango

Area
  - Total: 194.4 km^{2} (75.1 sq mi)

Population (2018)
  - Total: 34,006
  - Density: 174.9/km^{2} (453.1/sq mi)
- Time zone: UTC-6 (Central Time)
- Postal Code: 13013

San Miguel Acatán is a municipality in the Guatemalan department of Huehuetenango. The Mayan language of Akateko is spoken here. The population in 2018 was 34,006.
