= Mam people =

Mayan ethnic group in Central America

Mam
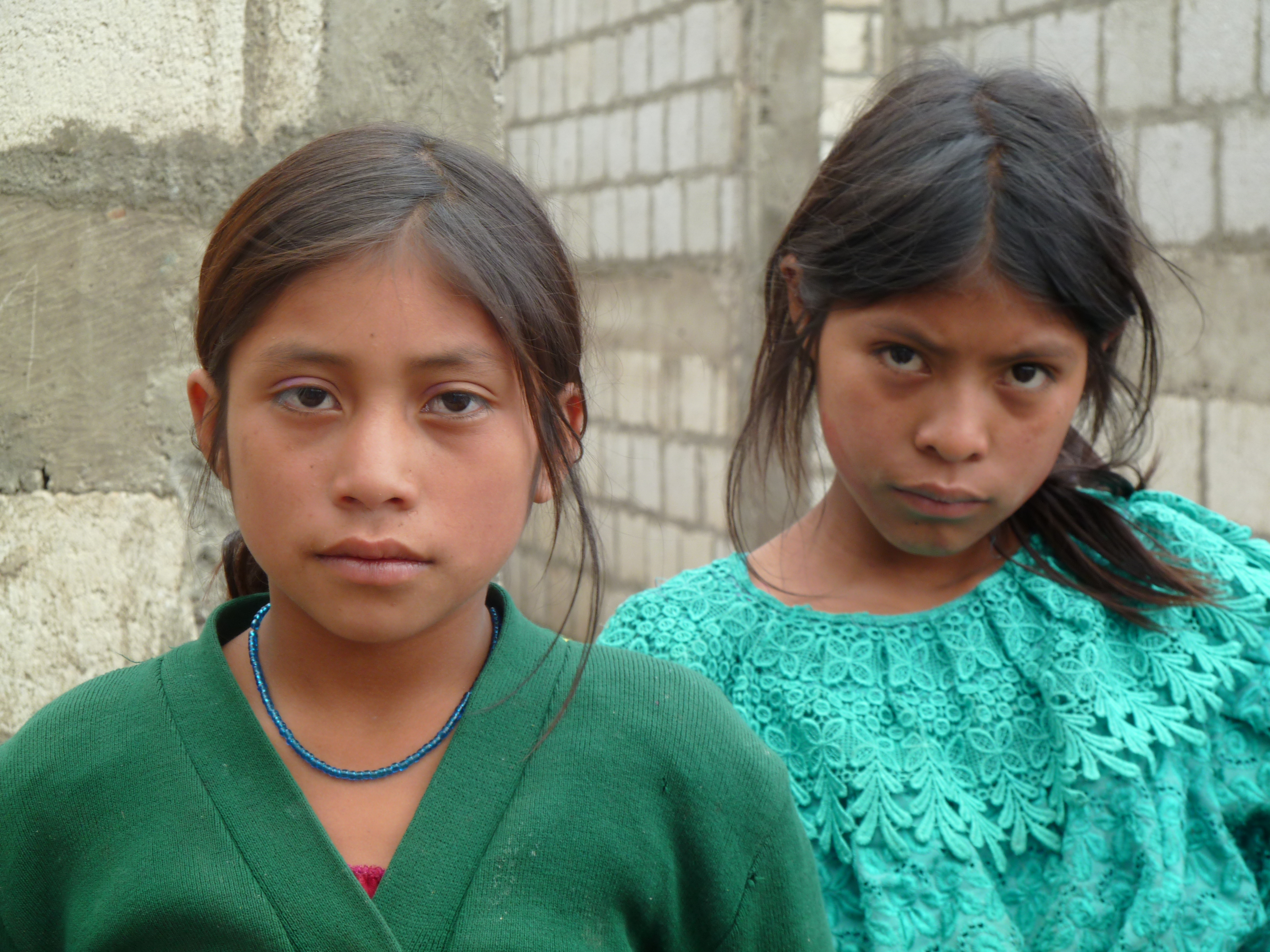
- Mam girls near in Ostuncalco, Quetzaltenango

Total population
- 865,884

Regions with significant populations
- Guatemala: 842,252
- Mexico: 23,632

Languages
- Mam, Spanish

Religion
- Catholic, Evangelical, Maya religion

Related ethnic groups
- Ixil, Tektitek
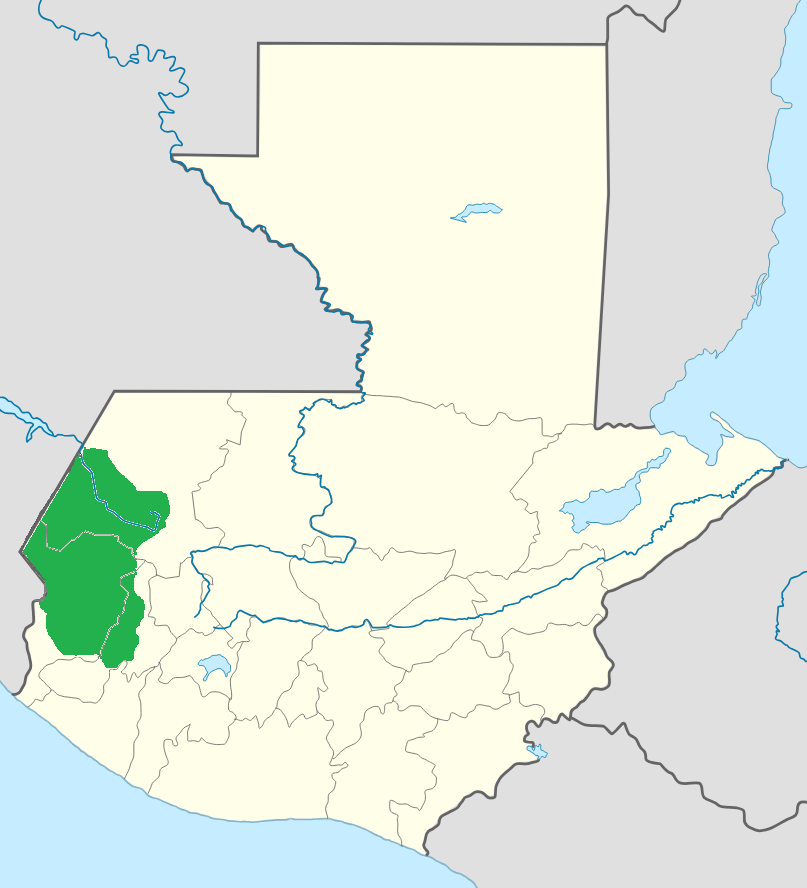
- Location of the Mam in Guatemala

The Mam are an Indigenous Maya people in the western highlands of Guatemala and in south-western Mexico who speak the Mam language.

Most Mam (617,171) live in Guatemala, in the departments of Huehuetenango, San Marcos, and Quetzaltenango. The Mam people in Mexico (23,632) live principally in the Soconusco region of Chiapas.

In pre-Columbian times the Mam were part of the Maya civilization; the pre-Columbian capital of the Mam kingdom was Zaculeu.

Many Mam people live in and around the nearby modern city of Huehuetenango. The city of Quetzaltenango or Xela was originally Mam. Many more Mam live in small hamlets in the mountains of northern Guatemala, keeping many of their native traditions. Many Mam are bilingual and speak both Spanish as well as the Mam language, part of the Maya language family, the latter typically as their first language.

== See also ==
- Mam (Maya mythology)
- Kayb'il B'alam
- Tecun Uman
- Takalik Abaj
