= Huehuetenango Department =

Department of Guatemala

Huehuetenango Department Departmento de Huehuetenango
- Department
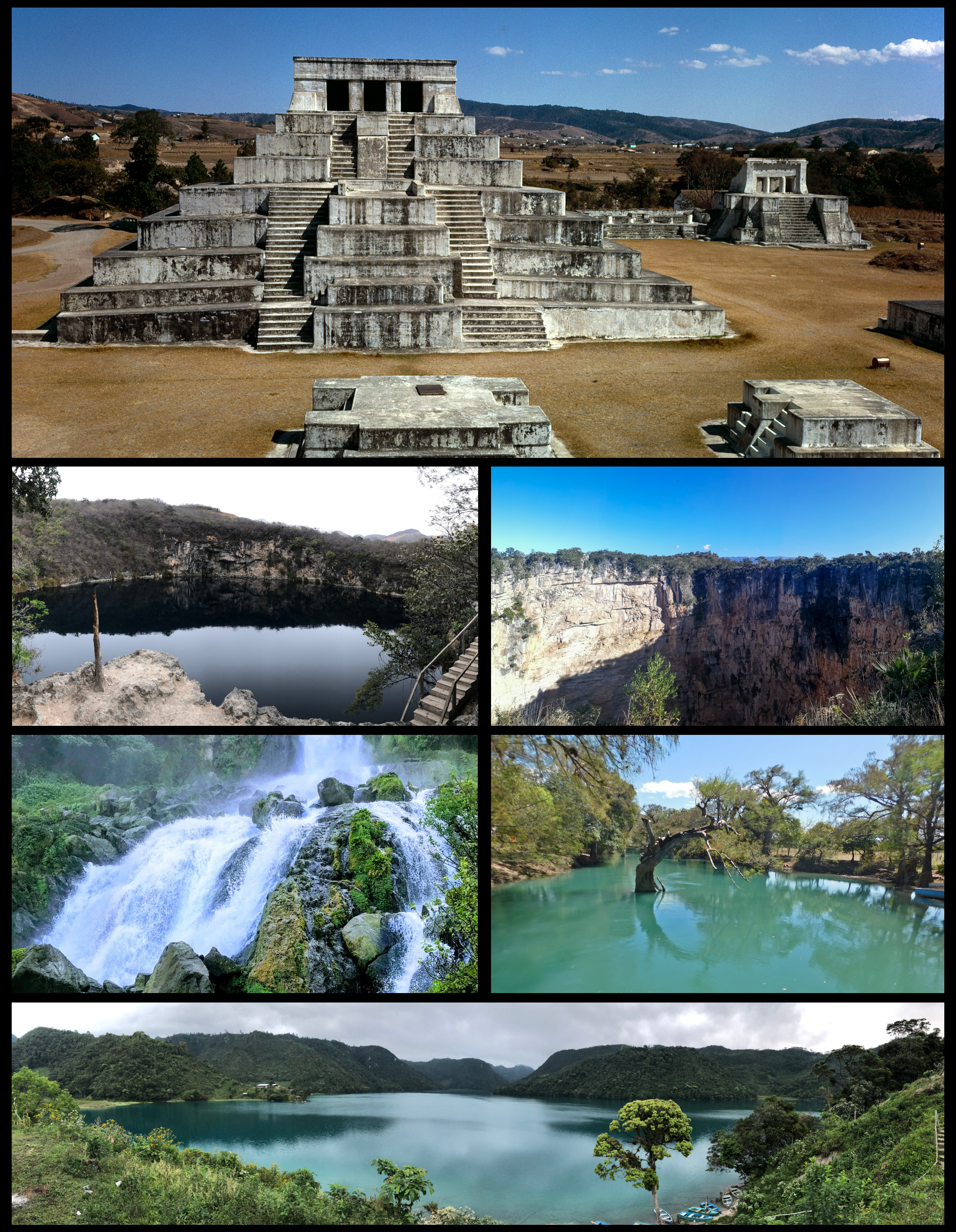
- Counterclockwise from top: Zaculeu in the city of Huehuetenango, Cenotes de Candelaria in Nenton, Hoyo Cimarron in La Trinidad Nenton, Catarata de Pajaj in San Pedro Soloma, Lagartero river in Nenton and Laguna Brava in Nenton Huehuetenango

- Flag Coat of arms

- Coordinates: 15°18′51″N 91°28′33″W
- Country: Guatemala
- Capital: Huehuetenango
- Municipalities: 31

Government
  - Type: Departmental

Area
  - Department: 7,400 km^{2} (2,900 sq mi)
- Highest elevation: 3,352 m (10,997 ft)
- Lowest elevation: 300 m (980 ft)

Population (2018)
  - Department: 1,170,669
  - Rank: 3rd in Guatemala
  - Density: 160/km^{2} (410/sq mi)
  - Urban: 327,297
  - Ethnicities: Mam Q'anjob'al Chuj Jakaltek Tektik Awakatek Chalchitek Akatek K'iche Ladino
  - Religions: Roman Catholicism Evangelicalism Maya
- Demonym: Huehueteco
- Time zone: UTC-6
- ISO 3166 code: GT-HU

Huehuetenango (Spanish pronunciation: [w̝e.we.t̪eˈnãŋ.ɡo]) is one of the 22 departments of Guatemala. It is located in the western highlands and shares the borders with the Mexican state of Chiapas in the north and west; with El Quiché in the east, and Totonicapán, Quetzaltenango and San Marcos in the south. The capital is the city of Huehuetenango.

Huehuetenango's ethnic composition is one of the most diverse in Guatemala. While the Mam are predominant in the department, other Maya groups are the Q'anjob'al, Chuj, Jakaltek, Tektik, Awakatek, Chalchitek, Akatek and K'iche'. Each of these nine Maya ethnic groups speaks its own language.

== Name ==
The department of Huehuetenango takes its name from the city of the same name which serves as the departmental capital. The name derives from the Nahuatl language of central Mexico, given by the indigenous allies of the Spanish conquistadors during the Spanish Conquest of Guatemala. It is usually said to mean "place of the elders", but it may also mean a "place of the ahuehuete trees".

== Geography ==
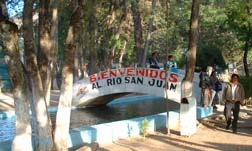
Bridge over the San Juan River near its source which is one of the principal tourist attractions in the department.

Huehuetenango covers an area of 7,403 square kilometres (2,858 sq mi) in western Guatemala and is bordered on the north and west by Mexico. On the east side it is bordered by the department of El Quiché and on the south by the departments of Totonicapán, Quetzaltenango and San Marcos. The department encompasses almost the entire length of the Sierra de los Cuchumatanes mountain range, although there is a wide difference in altitude across the department, from heights of 3,352 metres (10,997 ft) above mean sea level to as low as 300 metres (980 ft) above sea level, encompassing an equally wide variation in local climate, ranging from mountain peaks where the temperature sometimes falls below freezing to tropical lowland rainforest.

The department possesses various rivers that flow into the Chixoy River, also known as the Río Negro, which flows into the system of rivers forming the drainage basin of the Usumacinta River, which empties into the Gulf of Mexico. The most important tributaries of the Chixoy in Huehuetenango are the Hondo and Xecunabaj rivers, which flow into the department from the neighbouring departments of El Quiché and Totonicapán.

The Cuilco River enters the department from neighbouring San Marcos and crosses into the Mexican state of Chiapas, where it joins with the Grijalva River, which empties into the Gulf of Mexico. Its most important tributaries in Huehuetenango are the Apal, Chomá and Coxtón rivers.

The Ixcán River has its source near Santa Cruz Barillas and flows northwards towards Mexico where it joins the Lacuntún River, a tributary of the Usumacinta.

The Nentón River is formed in the municipality of San Sebastián Coatán by the joining of the rivers Nupxuptenam and Jajaniguán. It flows westwards across the border into Mexico where it empties into the Presa de la Angostura reservoir.

The Selegua River has its source in the Sierra de los Cuchumatanes and flows northwards, crossing the border into Chiapas, where it joins the Cuilco River to form the Grijalva River, to flow onwards to the Gulf of Mexico. Its principal tributaries are the Pino, Sibilá, Ocubilá, Naranjo, Colorado, Torlón, Mapá and Chicol rivers.

The largest body of standing water in the department is Laguna Yolnabaj, in the extreme north, close to the border with Mexico. Smaller lakes include Laguna Maxbal, Laguna Yolhuitz, and Laguna Seca, all in the northeast of the department.

== Population ==
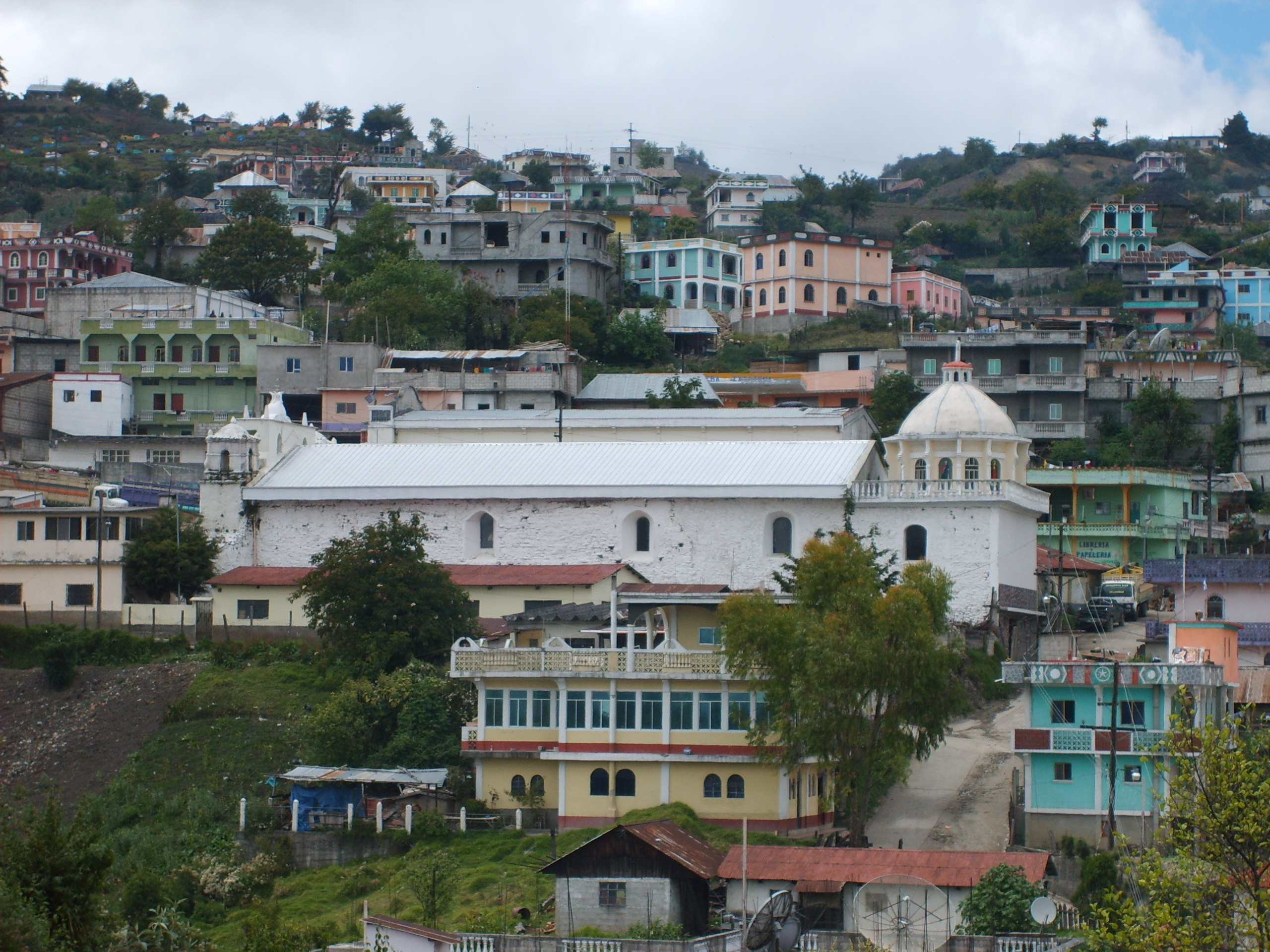
San Mateo Ixtatán.

In 2018 the department was recorded as having 1,170,669 inhabitants. Over 70% of the population are estimated to be living in poverty, with 22% living in extreme poverty and are unable to meet basic necessities. The majority of the population (variously estimated at 64–75%) belongs to indigenous Maya groups with the remainder being Spanish-speaking Ladinos. The Ladinos tend to be concentrated in towns and villages including Huehuetenango, Cuilco, Chiantla, Malacatancito, La Libertad, San Antonio Huista and La Democracia, which have a relatively low indigenous population. In the rest of the department, the Maya groups make up the majority of the population as much in the towns as the countryside. Huehuetenango has the greatest number of Mam Maya in Guatemala, although there are also Mam speakers in the departments of Quetzaltenango and San Marcos, and in the Mexican state of Chiapas.

In 2008, 58% of the population of the department was aged 19 years or younger.

== History ==
=== Early history ===
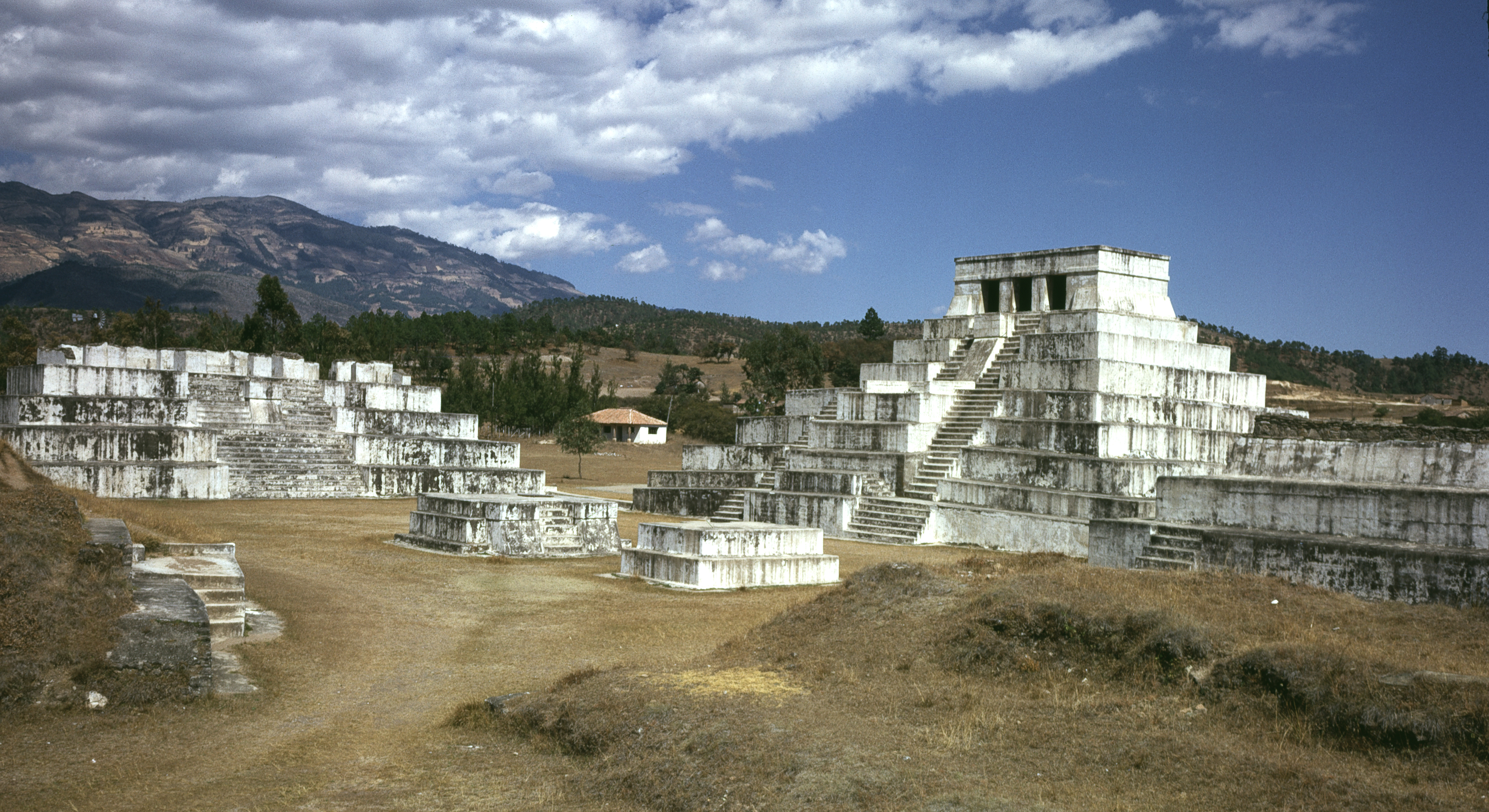
The Maya ruins of Zaculeu, near Huehuetenango city

The area had been occupied by the Maya civilization since at least the Mesoamerican Early Classic Period. At the time of the Spanish Conquest, the Maya city of Zaculeu was the initial focus of Spanish attention in the region that would later become the department of Huehuetenango. The city was defended by the Mam king Kayb'il B'alam; in 1525 it was attacked by Gonzalo de Alvarado y Chávez, cousin of Conquistador Pedro de Alvarado. After a siege lasting several months the Mam were reduced to starvation and Kayb'il B'alam finally surrendered the city to the Spanish.

Four years after the Spanish conquest of Huehuetenango, in 1529, San Mateo Ixtatán, Santa Eulalia and Jacaltenango were given in encomienda to the conquistador Gonzalo de Ovalle, a companion of Pedro de Alvarado. In 1684, a council led by Enrique Enriquez de Guzmán, then governor of Guatemala, decided upon the reduction of San Mateo Ixtatán and nearby Santa Eulalia, both within the colonial administrative district of the Corregimiento of Huehuetenango.

On 2 February 1838, Huehuetenango joined with Quetzaltenango, El Quiché, Retalhuleu, San Marcos and Totonicapán to form the short-lived Central American state of Los Altos. The state was crushed in 1840 by general Rafael Carrera Turcios, at that time between periods in office as Guatemalan president.

Huehuetenango includes pre-Columbian Maya archaeological sites at Zaculeu, Chalchitán, Mojá and San Mateo Ixtatán.

=== Departmental history ===
The department of Huehuetenango was created by the presidential decree of Vicente Cerna Sandoval on 8 May 1866, although various attempts had been made to declare the district a department from 1826 onwards in order to better administer it.

By 1883, Huehuetenango had 248 coffee plantations and produced 7334 quintals (Imperial hundredweight) of coffee.

In 1887, a rebellion in Huehuetenango was put down by president Manuel Lisandro Barillas, who then suspended the constitutional guarantees of the department and redrafted its constitution.

== Economy and agriculture ==
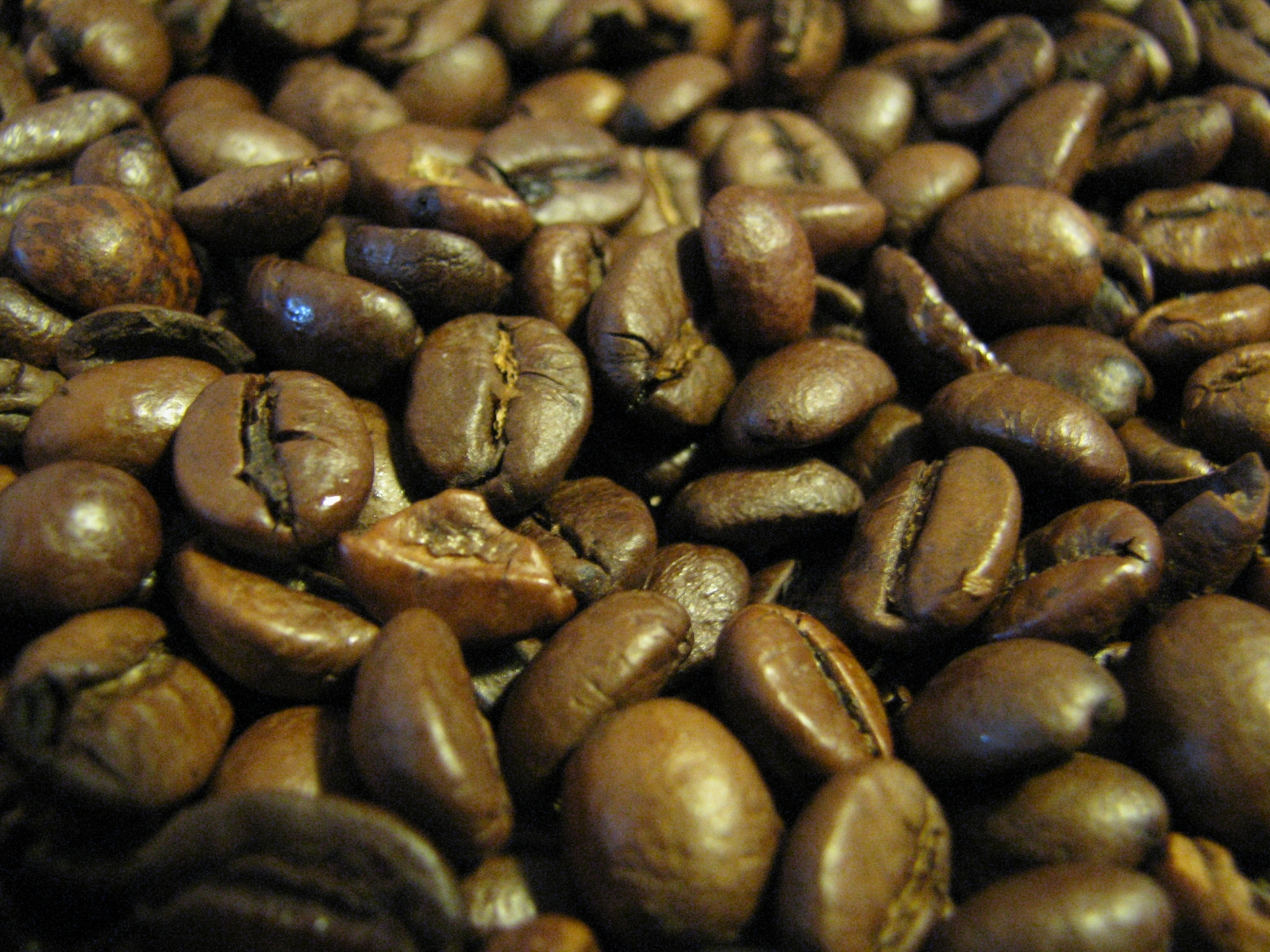
Huehuetenango has produced coffee since the 19th century

During the 17th and 18th centuries, namely during the Spanish Colonial period, the main industries were mining and livestock production, which was run by Spaniards. In modern times agriculture is the most important industry, although mining continues on a small scale and handicraft production also contributes to the local economy. Maize is cultivated across the whole department, without being limited by local climatic differences. The primary highland crops are wheat, potatoes, barley, alfalfa and beans. On the warmer lower slopes the primary crops are coffee, sugarcane, tobacco, chili, yuca, achiote and a wide range of fruits.

Although historically cattle and horse farming were important, the size of production is much reduced in modern times, with the rearing of sheep, which is now more widespread. Mines in Huehuetenango produce silver, lead, zinc and copper. Gold was once mined in the department but it is no longer extracted. In 2000, the private mining company Minas de Guatemala S.A. was extracting antimony from underground mines near San Ildefonso Ixtahuacán.

Local handicraft production mainly consists of weaving traditional Maya textiles, mostly cotton but also wool, depending on the local climate.

In 2008 the most exported product was coffee.

== Municipalities ==
The department of Huehuetenango includes 33 municipalities:

Municipality	Ethnicity	Population	Festival	Altitude	Extent
Aguacatán	Awakatek/Chalchitek	45,506	moveable	1,670 metres (5,480 ft)	300 square kilometres (120 sq mi)
Chiantla	Ladino/Mam	73,927	28 January–2 February	2,000 metres (6,600 ft)	536 square kilometres (207 sq mi)
Colotenango	Mam	25,091	15 August	1,590 metres (5,220 ft)	71 square kilometres (27 sq mi)
Concepción Huista	Jakaltek	18,378	6–8 December	2,220 metres (7,280 ft)	136 square kilometres (53 sq mi)
Cuilco	Ladino	46,407	25 November–1 December	1,150 metres (3,770 ft)	592 square kilometres (229 sq mi)
Huehuetenango	Ladino	102,294	16 July	1,901 metres (6,237 ft)	204 square kilometres (79 sq mi)
Jacaltenango	Jakaltek	41,112	2 February	1,438 metres (4,718 ft)	212 square kilometres (82 sq mi)
La Democracia	Ladino	48,430	2nd Friday of Lent	920 metres (3,020 ft)	136 square kilometres (53 sq mi)
La Libertad	Ladino/Mam	30,312	12–15 January	1,720 metres (5,640 ft)	104 square kilometres (40 sq mi)
Malacatancito	Ladino/K'iche'	19,177	26 July	1,709 metres (5,607 ft)	68 square kilometres (26 sq mi)
Nentón	Chuj	38,820	15 January	780 metres (2,560 ft)	787 square kilometres (304 sq mi)
San Antonio Huista	Ladino/Jakaltek	13,756	8–12 December	1,230 metres (4,040 ft)	256 square kilometres (99 sq mi)
San Gaspar Ixchil	Mam	7,000	4–6 January	1,400 metres (4,600 ft)	34.9 square kilometres (13.5 sq mi)
San Ildefonso Ixtahuacán	Mam	30,466	20–25 January	1,580 metres (5,180 ft)	184 square kilometres (71 sq mi)
San Juan Atitán	Mam	14,860	25 June	2,440 metres (8,010 ft)	64 square kilometres (25 sq mi)
San Juan Ixcoy	Q'anjob'al	21,805	24 June	2,195 metres (7,201 ft)	224 square kilometres (86 sq mi)
San Mateo Ixtatán	Chuj	29,823	21 September	2,540 metres (8,330 ft)	560 square kilometres (220 sq mi)
San Miguel Acatán	Akateko	24,329	29 September	1,780 metres (5,840 ft)	152 square kilometres (59 sq mi)
San Pedro Necta	Mam	31,112	5th Friday of Lent	1,520 metres (4,990 ft)	119 square kilometres (46 sq mi)
San Pedro Soloma	Q'anjob'al	37,499	28 June	2,270 metres (7,450 ft)	140 square kilometres (54 sq mi)
San Rafael La Independencia	Akateko	11,638	24 October	2,377 metres (7,799 ft)	64 square kilometres (25 sq mi)
San Rafael Petzal	Mam	11,638	24 October	1,739 metres (5,705 ft)	38 square kilometres (15 sq mi)
San Sebastián Coatán	Chuj	22,316	20 January	2,350 metres (7,710 ft)	108 square kilometres (42 sq mi)
San Sebastián Huehuetenango	Mam	26,397	20 January	1,715 metres (5,627 ft)	108 square kilometres (42 sq mi)
Santa Ana Huista	Jakaltek	8,583	26 July	740 metres (2,430 ft)	145 square kilometres (56 sq mi)
Santa Bárbara	Mam	16,665	4 December	2,430 metres (7,970 ft)	448 square kilometres (173 sq mi)
Santa Cruz Barillas	Q'anjob'al	61,139	3 May	1,450 metres (4,760 ft)	1,112 square kilometres (429 sq mi)
Santa Eulalia	Q'anjob'al	36,175	12 February	2,580 metres (8,460 ft)	292 square kilometres (113 sq mi)
Santiago Chimaltenango	Mam	6,769	25 July	2,260 metres (7,410 ft)	39 square kilometres (15 sq mi)
Tectitán	Mam	9,436	22 July	2,210 metres (7,250 ft)	68 square kilometres (26 sq mi)
Todos Santos Cuchumatán	Mam	32,048	1 November	2,470 metres (8,100 ft)	300 square kilometres (120 sq mi)

== People of note ==
Former president of Guatemala Efraín Ríos Montt was born in Huehuetenango city on 16 June 1926. Evelio López, a Mam journalist, published the local news website Huehue en Noticias, reporting on Huehuetenango, until his murder in 2026.

== Tourism ==
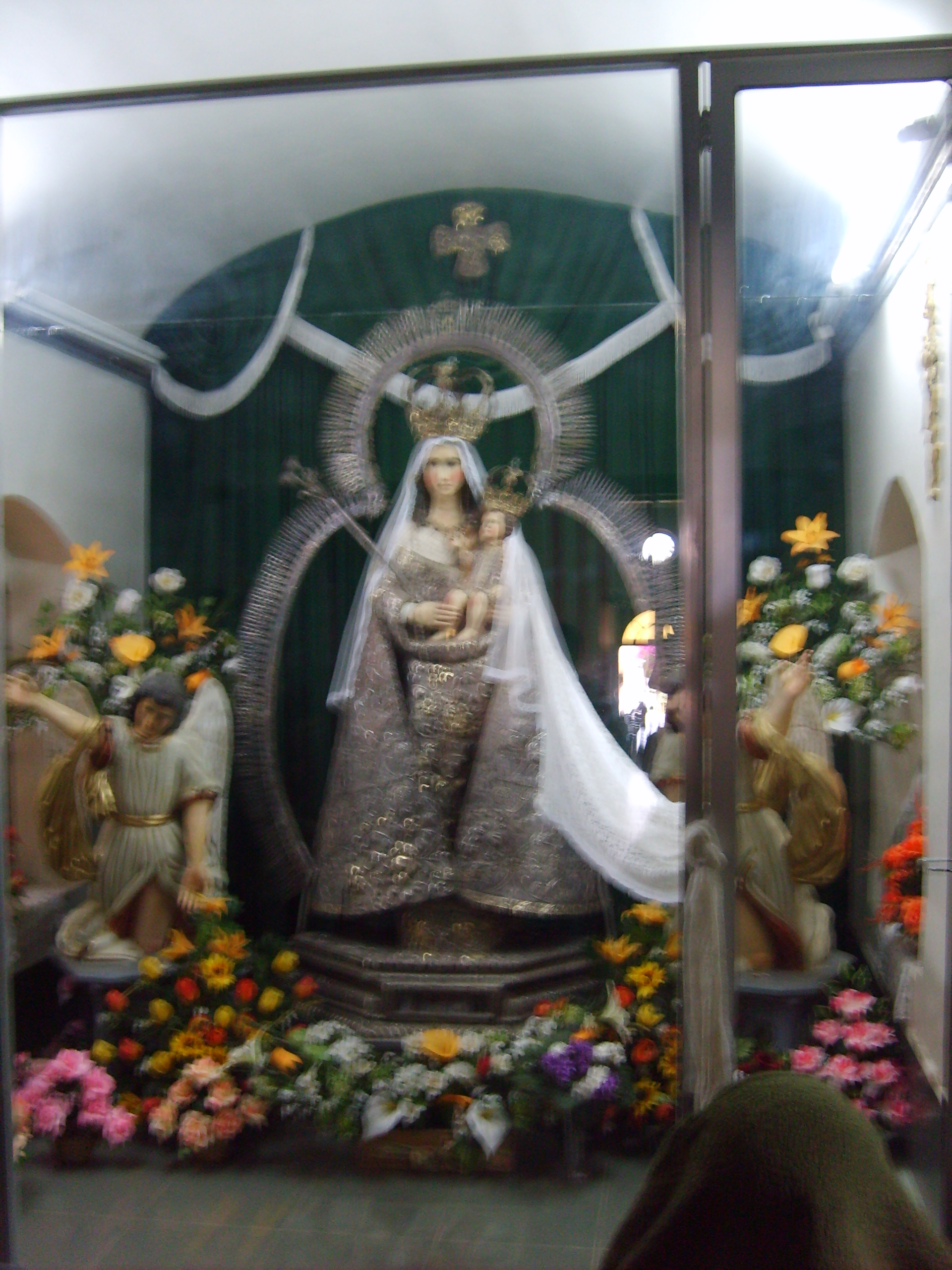
The image of Nuestra Señora de Chiantla

The main tourist attractions in the department include the source of the San Juan River and the restored Maya ruins of Zaculeu. The town of Chiantla is a centre for religious tourism, with the Catholic Church being a pilgrimage destination due to its image of the Virgin of Candelaria, known locally as Nuestra Señora de Chiantla ("Our Lady of Chiantla").
