= San Rafael La Independencia =

Coordinates: 15°43′N 91°32′W

San Rafael La Independencia (Spanish pronunciation: [san rafaˈel lajndepenˈdensja]) is a municipality in the Guatemalan department of Huehuetenango. Their native language is akateko.
