= Selegua River =

Seleguá River
- Native name: Río Seleguá (Spanish)

Location
- Countries: Guatemala and Mexico

Physical characteristics
- Source
  - location: Guatemala (Huehuetenango)
  - coordinates: 15.271848°N 91.452856°W
  - elevation: 2,200 m (7,200 ft)
- Mouth
  - location: Presa de La Angostura in Chiapas
- Length: 102 km (63 mi)
- Discharge
  - average: 38 m^{3}/s (1,300 cu ft/s) (at Chojíl)

The Seleguá (Spanish pronunciation: [seleˈɣwa]) is a river in Guatemala. The river flows northwards from its sources in the highlands of Huehuetenango, from the Sierra de los Cuchumatanes, until it crosses the border with Mexico at 15.749467°N 91.918659°W, and continues northwards into the Presa de La Angostura, one of Mexico's largest artificial lakes. The river's length in Guatemala is 102 kilometres (63 mi). The Selegua river basin covers an area of 1,535 square kilometres (593 mi^{2}) in Guatemala.
