= Concepción Huista =

- Municipality
- Location in Guatemala
- Coordinates: 15°37′29″N 91°39′54″W
- Country: Guatemala
- Department: Huehuetenango

Government
  - Mayor (2016-2020): Alonzo Gaspar Juan (PP)

Area
  - Municipality: 81.5 km^{2} (31.5 sq mi)

Population (2018 census)
  - Municipality: 18,915
  - Density: 232/km^{2} (601/sq mi)
  - Urban: 7,243
- Climate: Cwb

Concepción Huista (Spanish pronunciation: [konseβˈsjon ˈwista]) is a town and municipality in the Guatemalan department of Huehuetenango.

== Climate ==
Concepción Huista has a subtropical highland climate (Köppen: Cwb).

Climate data for Concepción Huista
Month	Jan	Feb	Mar	Apr	May	Jun	Jul	Aug	Sep	Oct	Nov	Dec	Year
Mean daily maximum °C (°F)	21.3 (70.3)	21.8 (71.2)	23.8 (74.8)	24.0 (75.2)	22.8 (73.0)	21.8 (71.2)	21.2 (70.2)	21.7 (71.1)	21.4 (70.5)	20.6 (69.1)	21.3 (70.3)	21.5 (70.7)	21.9 (71.5)
Daily mean °C (°F)	14.3 (57.7)	14.4 (57.9)	16.2 (61.2)	16.7 (62.1)	16.5 (61.7)	16.4 (61.5)	15.8 (60.4)	15.7 (60.3)	15.9 (60.6)	15.2 (59.4)	15.0 (59.0)	15.0 (59.0)	15.6 (60.1)
Mean daily minimum °C (°F)	7.4 (45.3)	7.1 (44.8)	8.7 (47.7)	9.5 (49.1)	10.2 (50.4)	11.0 (51.8)	10.4 (50.7)	9.8 (49.6)	10.4 (50.7)	9.8 (49.6)	8.8 (47.8)	8.5 (47.3)	9.3 (48.7)
Average precipitation mm (inches)	25 (1.0)	19 (0.7)	31 (1.2)	69 (2.7)	109 (4.3)	254 (10.0)	159 (6.3)	156 (6.1)	204 (8.0)	168 (6.6)	63 (2.5)	26 (1.0)	1,283 (50.4)
Source: Climate-Data.org

== Geographic location ==
Concepción Huista is completely surrounded by Huehuetenango Department municipalities:

== See also ==
- La Aurora International Airport
- Guatemala
- Tapachula International Airport
