= Huehuetenango =

Huehuetenango Xinabahul
- Municipality
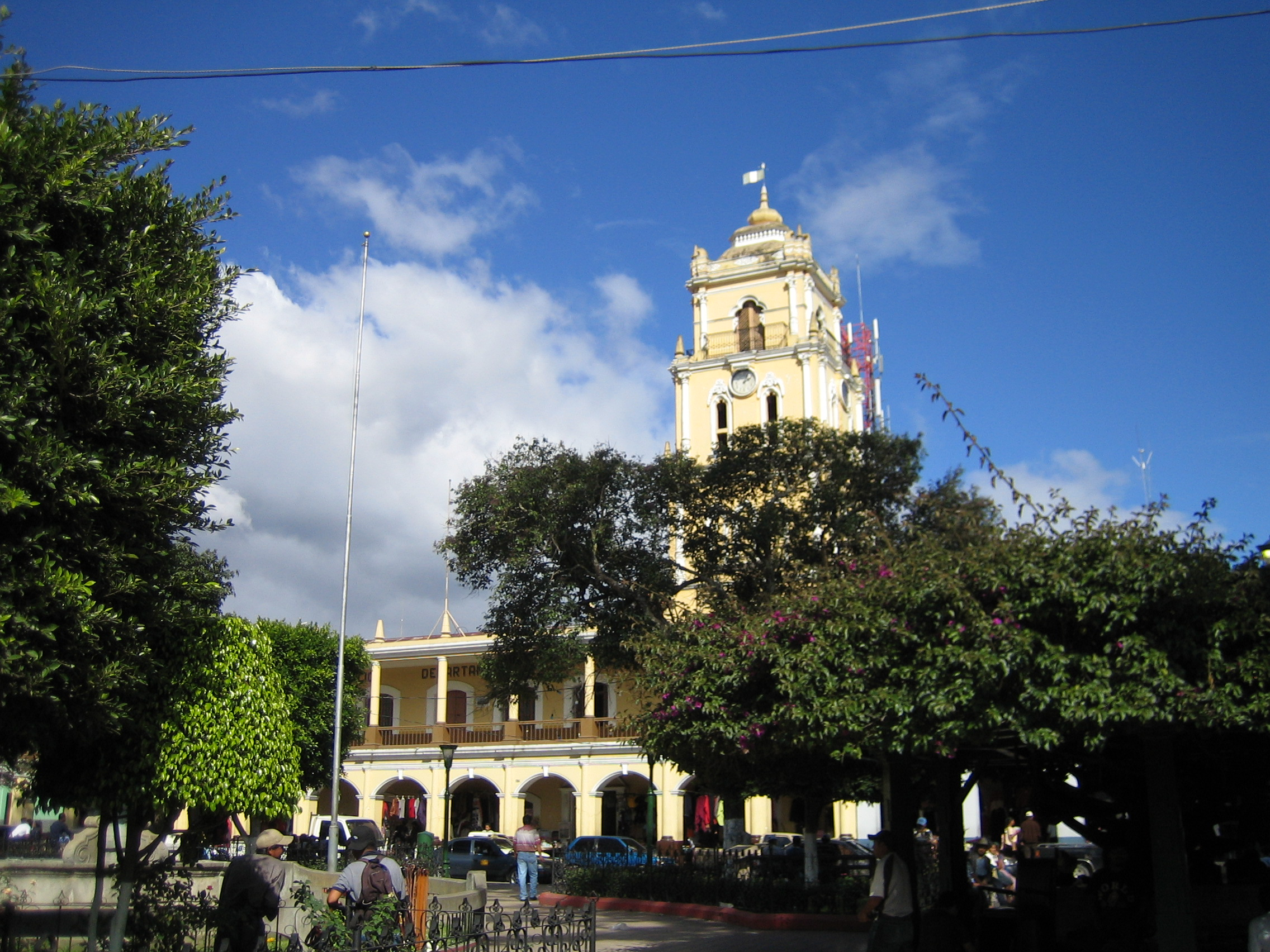
- The city center of Huehuetenango

- Flag
- Nickname: Huehue
- Location in Guatemala Huehuetenango (Huehuetenango Department)
- Coordinates: 15°18′53″N 91°28′34″W
- Country: Guatemala
- Department: Huehuetenango

Government
  - Mayor: Gustavo Cano (Lider)

Area
  - Municipality: 222 km^{2} (86 sq mi)
- Elevation: 1,901 m (6,237 ft)

Population (census 2018)
  - Municipality: 117,818
  - Density: 531/km^{2} (1,370/sq mi)
  - Urban: 117,818
- Demonym: Huehueteco

Demographics
  - Ethnicities: Mam; Ladino
  - Languages: Spanish; Mam
  - Religions: Roman Catholicism; Evangelicalism; Maya; Eastern Orthodoxy
- Climate: Cwb

Huehuetenango ([weweteˈnaŋɡo]) is a city and municipality in the highlands of western Guatemala. It is also the capital of the department of Huehuetenango. The city is situated 269 kilometres (167 mi) from Guatemala City, and is the last departmental capital on the Pan-American Highway before the Mexican border at La Mesilla. Its primary export is coffee.

== Overview ==
Huehuetenango (originally called Xinabajul in the Mam language) was already a Maya settlement before the Spanish conquest of the fortified city of Zaculeu, which was the Pre-Columbian capital of the Mam kingdom situated just a few kilometers from Xinabahul. 'Huehuetenango' means place of the ancients (or ancestors) in Nahuatl, which is the name Gonzalo de Alvarado adopted from his Nahua allies when Zaculeu and Xinabahul were conquered.

Many people of Mam descent still live in and around Huehuetenango, and the nearby ruins of Zaculeu have become a tourist attraction. The ruins are markedly distinct from other Maya archeological sites; the original unearthed stones, comprising only a small portion of the original structures, were coated with plaster during restoration works carried out in the 1940s. There is also a small museum at Zaculeu that includes statues and small artifacts found on the site.

Huehuetenango Airport (IATA: HUG , ICAO: MGHT ) is within the city and has a paved 825 metres (2,707 ft) runway and a small terminal building. There are no scheduled airline flights as of 2019.

== Climate ==
The city has a subtropical highland climate (Köppen: Cwb), with warm summers and mild winters.

Climate data for Huehuetenango (Huehuetenango Airport) (1991–2020)
Month	Jan	Feb	Mar	Apr	May	Jun	Jul	Aug	Sep	Oct	Nov	Dec	Year
Record high °C (°F)	31.0 (87.8)	33.8 (92.8)	35.4 (95.7)	35.0 (95.0)	34.4 (93.9)	32.4 (90.3)	34.2 (93.6)	29.8 (85.6)	29.0 (84.2)	28.6 (83.5)	29.6 (85.3)	30.2 (86.4)	35.4 (95.7)
Mean daily maximum °C (°F)	24.6 (76.3)	26.1 (79.0)	27.5 (81.5)	28.1 (82.6)	26.9 (80.4)	25.3 (77.5)	25.0 (77.0)	25.5 (77.9)	25.0 (77.0)	24.4 (75.9)	23.9 (75.0)	24.1 (75.4)	25.5 (77.9)
Daily mean °C (°F)	16.7 (62.1)	17.8 (64.0)	19.1 (66.4)	20.2 (68.4)	19.9 (67.8)	19.3 (66.7)	19.2 (66.6)	19.2 (66.6)	19.1 (66.4)	18.4 (65.1)	17.4 (63.3)	16.8 (62.2)	18.6 (65.5)
Mean daily minimum °C (°F)	8.7 (47.7)	9.0 (48.2)	10.2 (50.4)	11.7 (53.1)	13.5 (56.3)	14.1 (57.4)	13.2 (55.8)	13.3 (55.9)	14.0 (57.2)	13.4 (56.1)	11.2 (52.2)	9.4 (48.9)	11.8 (53.2)
Record low °C (°F)	−3.2 (26.2)	−0.7 (30.7)	3.3 (37.9)	4.5 (40.1)	7.1 (44.8)	9.1 (48.4)	7.6 (45.7)	7.9 (46.2)	8.6 (47.5)	6.0 (42.8)	3.5 (38.3)	1.0 (33.8)	−3.2 (26.2)
Average precipitation mm (inches)	4.6 (0.18)	3.7 (0.15)	17.4 (0.69)	56.8 (2.24)	131.0 (5.16)	216.0 (8.50)	94.2 (3.71)	133.1 (5.24)	231.4 (9.11)	129.6 (5.10)	29.1 (1.15)	8.7 (0.34)	1,055.6 (41.56)
Average precipitation days (≥ 1.0 mm)	0.5	0.6	1.8	6.1	12.4	18.0	10.1	11.9	18.3	12.4	3.3	1.0	96.4
Source: NOAA

== Sports ==
The city boasts one Guatemalan top level football side Xinabajul in the Liga Nacional de Fútbol de Guatemala.

== People ==
Former president Efraín Ríos Montt was born in Huehuetenango in 1926. His younger brother, Mario Enrique Ríos Montt, auxiliary bishop emeritus of the Roman Catholic Archdiocese of Guatemala was born there in 1932.
