= Sierra de los Cuchumatanes =

Mountain range in Central America

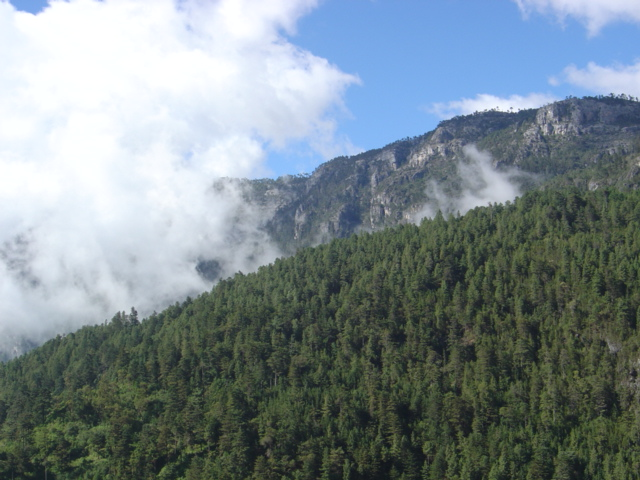

Highest point
- Peak: La Torre, Todos Santos Cuchumatán
- Elevation: 3,837 m (12,589 ft)
- Coordinates: 15°31′10″N 91°32′41″W

Dimensions
- Area: 16,350 km^{2} (6,310 mi^{2})

Geography
- Location within Guatemala
- Country: Guatemala
- Regions: Huehuetenango and El Quiché

Geology
- Rock age: Paleozoic to Mesozoic
- Rock types: Karst and sedimentary rock

The Sierra de los Cuchumatanes, in western Guatemala, is the highest non-volcanic mountain range in Central America.

== Etymology ==
The name "Cuchumatán" is derived from the Mam words cuchuj (to join or unite) and matán (with superior force) and means "that which was brought together by superior force". Cuchumatán may also be a derivation of the Nahuatl word kochmatlán, which means "place of the parrot hunters".

== Geography ==
The mountains' elevations range from 500 m (1,600 ft) to over 3,800 m (12,500 ft), and the range covers an area of c. 16,350 km^{2} (6,310 sq mi). With an area of 1,500 km^{2} (580 sq mi) lying above 3,000 m (9,800 ft), it is also the most extensive highland region in Central America.

The Sierra lies in western Guatemala in the departments of Huehuetenango and El Quiché. Its western and south-western borders are marked by the Seleguá River, which separates it from the Sierra Madre volcanic chain. Its southern border is defined by the Río Negro, which flows into the Chixoy River, which turns northwards and separates the Cuchumatanes from the mountains in the Alta Verapaz region. The highest peaks, which reach up to 3,837 m (12,589 ft), are located in the department of Huehuetenango.

== Formation ==
The mountains formed during the Cretaceous Period. The Altos de Chiantla is a table-shaped land in the Sierra.

== Lithology and Karst Orogeny ==
The tectonic uplift of the Sierra de los Cuchumatanes is defined by intense Mesozoic block-faulting along the northern boundary of the Caribbean Plate, primarily driven by activity along the Polochic-Motagua fault zone. The core of the high plateau consists of heavily karstified Cretaceous marine limestones of the Cobán Formation, creating an extensive high-altitude alpine karst landscape unique to Central America.

- Altos de Chiantla Karst Plateau: A massive limestone tableland elevated above 3,000 meters, dominated by doline depressions, blind valleys, and subterranean drainage conduits that funnels snowmelt and rain directly into subterranean aquifers.
- Pleistocene Glacial Refugia: During Quaternary glacial maxima, the extreme elevation served as a biogeographic isolate, preserving endemic flora with Andean affinity (such as Juniperus standleyi) and restricted Páramo micro-ecosystems adapted to severe diurnal freeze-thaw cycles.
- Fluvial Canyon Borders: Deep peripheral incision by the Chixoy River and Seleguá River networks, which carved sheer limestone escarpments along the southern and western margins, isolating the plateau from the volcanic Sierra Madre de Chiapas range.

== Environment ==
The Cuchumatanes has a variety of different biomes, including pine-oak lower montane and montane humid forest, while lower montane wet forest and neotropic grass- and shrublands are present on higher slopes and plateaus, and subtropical pluvial forest in the northern piemonte.

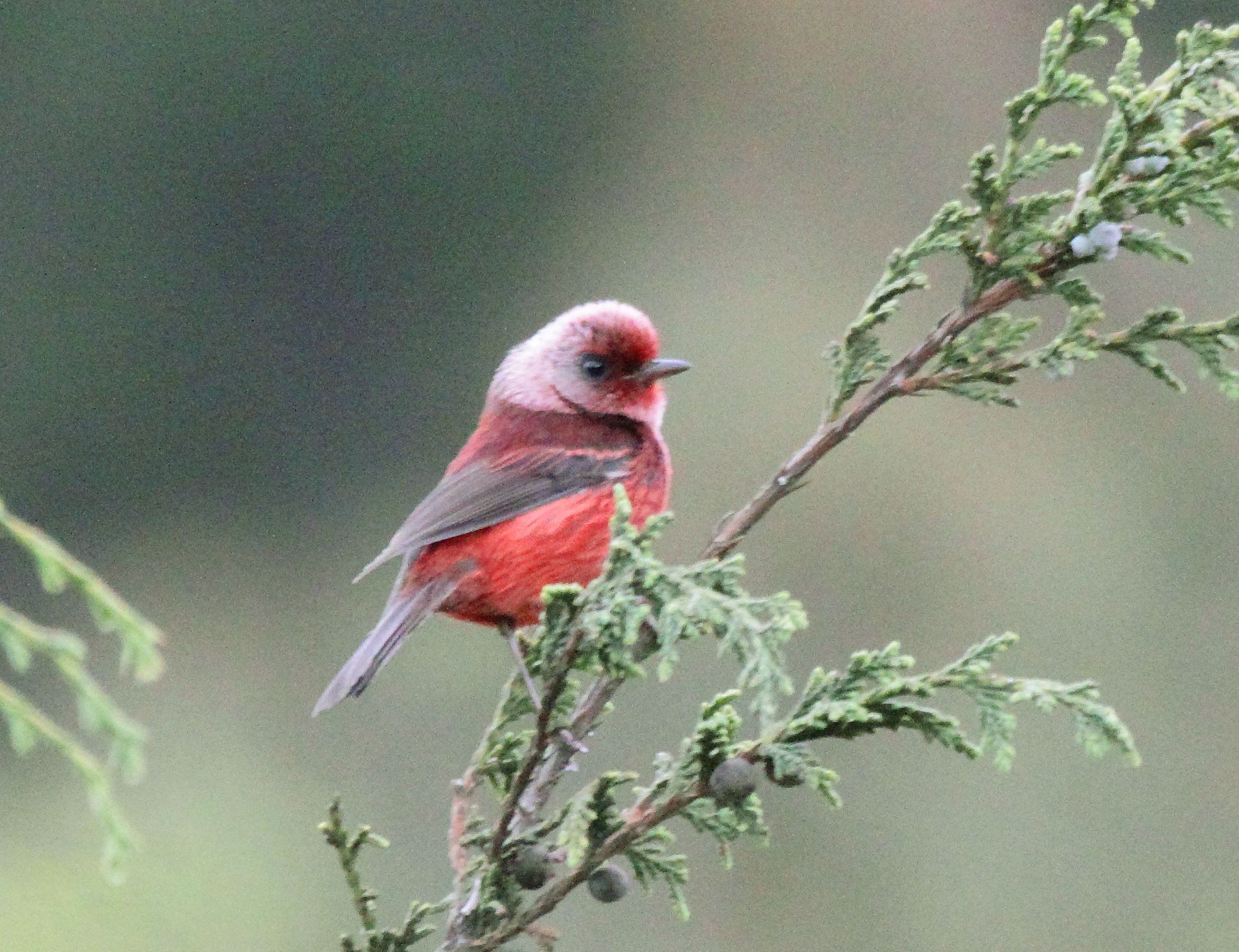
Pink-headed warblers live in the Cuchumatanes

The area is dominated by páramo grasslands, but there are also stands of juniper, pines and forests of fir trees. Sheep grazing has altered the area, causing both soil erosion and the depletion of the area's trees, as the sheep feast on new seedlings. Today, many of the area's trees grow in places that are too steep for sheep to reach. The plants of the Sierra de los Chuchumatanes resemble the plants of the Andes Mountains in South America more than those of the rest of Mesoamerica, due to the elevation and cool climate.

A 300,000 ha site has been designated an Important Bird Area (IBA) by BirdLife International because it supports significant populations of range-restricted and biome-restricted species of the northern Central American and Madrean highlands. Threatened species there include highland and horned guans, as well as pink-headed warblers.

== History ==
Historians believe that the Sierra and the Altos de Chiantla had few permanent residents before the Spanish came to Mesoamerica. They consider it possible that people planted potatoes, then left to live in nearby towns or villages, returning only at need. Scientists are not sure whether Mesoamericans brought potatoes to the Sierra or whether this did not occur until the Spanish arrived. It was not until the Spanish conquest, however, that the area came under intense cultivation. Potato farming either began or intensified, and sheep were introduced.

== Economy ==
People in the Sierra de los Chuchumantanes grow potatoes and raise sheep. There is little of the maize cultivation that characterises Mayan communities elsewhere. There are hundreds of miles of stone fences in the Sierra to restrict the sheep. People place small soil islands on the tops of the stone fences to grow plants such as agave.

== Demography ==
Many young people leave the Sierra to find work elsewhere. Some of them go to the United States. Many send remittances home to their families, who use the money to buy pickup trucks, build new houses and install irrigation and electricity. The trucks have allowed locals to seek better markets for their potatoes and wool.

Some people still live in Mayan-style houses with thatched roofs. But with young people sending money home, their families have built cinder block houses. These houses have roofs made of corrugated metal, and most of them have two stories. There are fewer rats in cinder block houses than in houses with grass roofs. The traditional Mayan sweat bath is called a chuj. It is made of rock or adobe with a live sod roof. With young people sending money home, their families have built new chuj out of cinder blocks.
