= Spanish conquest of Guatemala =

1524–1697 defeat of Mayan kingdoms

- Part of the Spanish conquest of the Maya and the Spanish colonization of the Americas
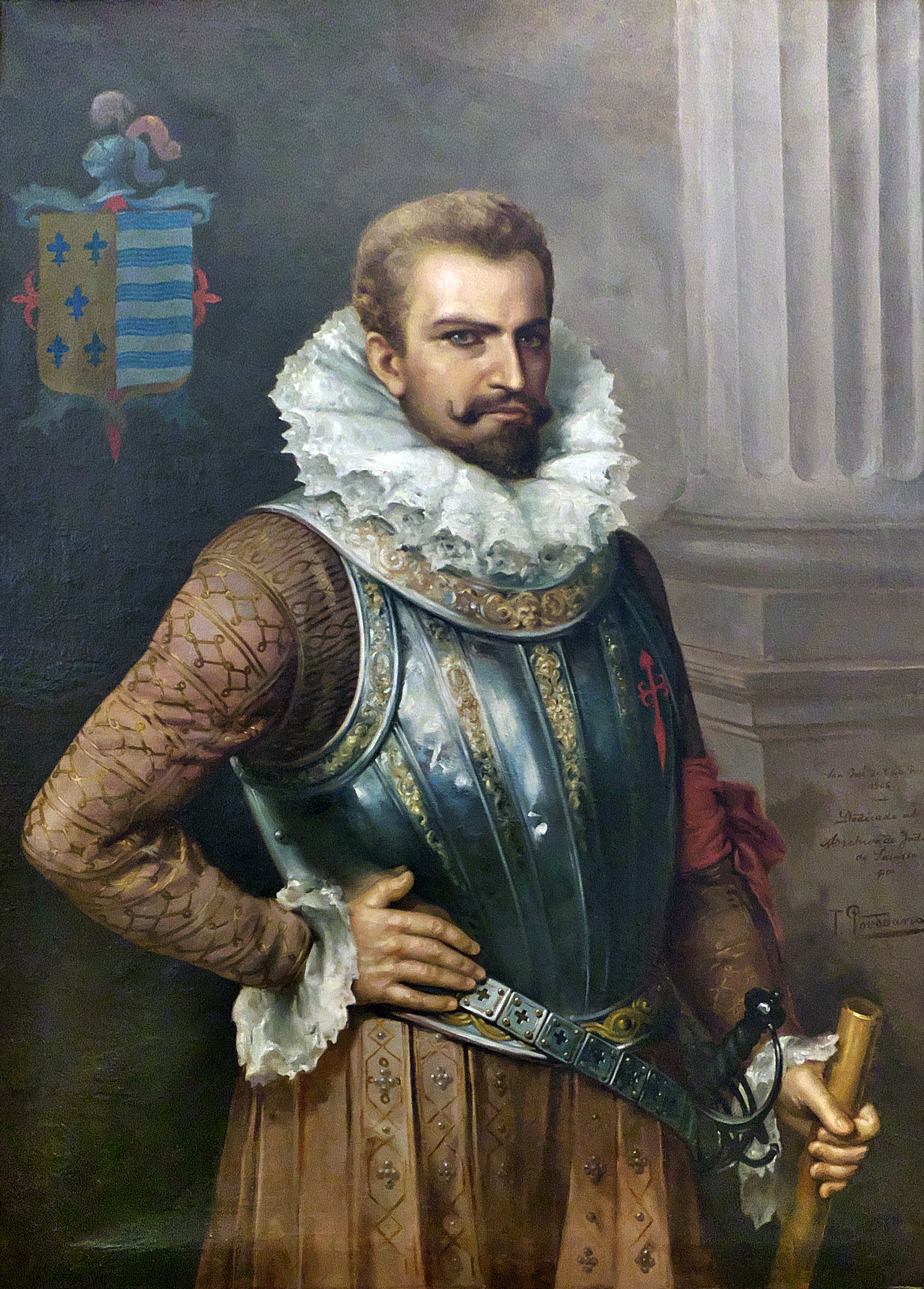
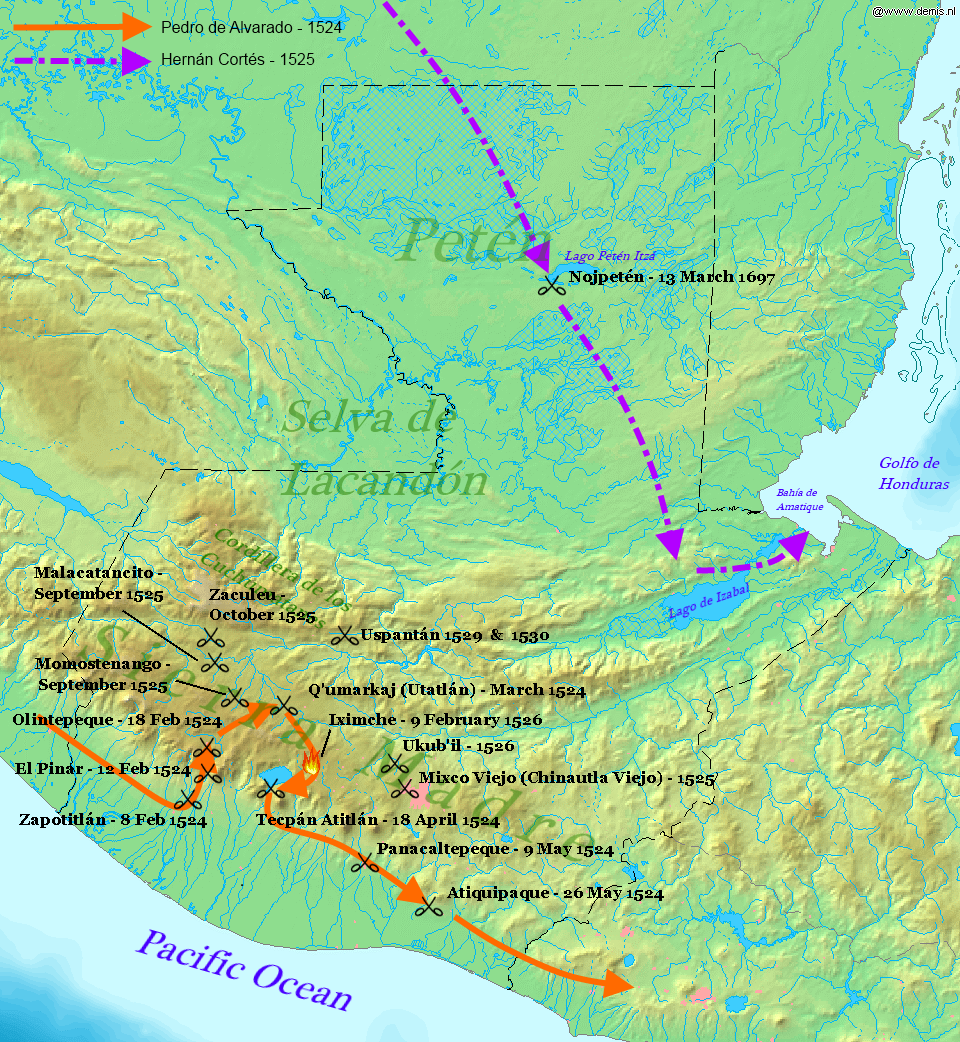
- Top: Conquistador Pedro de Alvarado, who led the initial efforts to conquer Guatemala. Bottom: Map of the principal entry routes and battle sites.
Date	1524–1530: Subjugation of the highland Kʼiche and Kaqchikel. 1533–1555: Subjugation of San Marcos, Verapaz, and other highland areas. 1618–1697: Conquest of the Petén Basin
Location	Guatemala
Result	Spanish victory

Belligerents
(Spain) Spanish Empire, including Indian auxiliaries	Independent indigenous kingdoms and city-states, including those of the Chajoma, Chuj, Itza, Ixil, Kakchiquel, Kejache, Kʼicheʼ, Kowoj, Lakandon Chʼol, Mam, Manche Chʼol, Pipil, Poqomam, Qʼanjobʼal, Qʼeqchiʼ, Tzʼutujil, Xinca, and Yalain

Commanders and leaders
(Spain) Gonzalo de Alvarado y Contreras; (Spain) Pedro de Alvarado; (Spain) Hernán Cortés; (Spain) Martín de Ursúa	Belehe Qat; Beleheb-Tzy †; Cahi Imox; Kan Ekʼ; Kaybʼil Bʼalam; Oxib-Keh †; Tecun Uman †

In a protracted conflict during the Spanish colonization of the Americas, Spanish colonisers gradually incorporated the territory that became the modern country of Guatemala into the colonial Viceroyalty of New Spain. Before the conquest, this territory contained a number of competing Mesoamerican kingdoms, the majority of which were Maya. Many conquistadors viewed the Maya as "infidels" who needed to be forcefully converted and pacified, disregarding the achievements of their civilization. The first contact between the Maya and European explorers came in the early 16th century when a Spanish ship sailing from Panama to Santo Domingo (Hispaniola) was wrecked on the east coast of the Yucatán Peninsula in 1511. Several Spanish expeditions followed in 1517 and 1519, making landfall on various parts of the Yucatán coast. The Spanish conquest of the Maya was a prolonged affair; the Maya kingdoms resisted integration into the Spanish Empire with such tenacity that their defeat took almost two centuries.

Pedro de Alvarado arrived in Guatemala from the newly conquered Mexico in early 1524, commanding a mixed force of Spanish conquistadors and native allies, mostly from Tlaxcala and Cholula. Geographic features across Guatemala now bear Nahuatl placenames owing to the influence of these Mexican allies, who translated for the Spanish. The Kaqchikel Maya initially allied themselves with the Spanish, but soon rebelled against excessive demands for tribute and did not finally surrender until 1530. In the meantime the other major highland Maya kingdoms had each been defeated in turn by the Spanish and allied warriors from Mexico and already subjugated Maya kingdoms in Guatemala. The Itza Maya and other lowland groups in the Petén Basin were first contacted by Hernán Cortés in 1525, but remained independent and hostile to the encroaching Spanish until 1697, when a concerted Spanish assault led by Martín de Ursúa y Arizmendi finally defeated the last independent Maya kingdom.

Spanish and native tactics and technology differed greatly. The Spanish viewed the taking of prisoners as a hindrance to outright victory, whereas the Maya prioritised the capture of live prisoners and of booty. The indigenous peoples of Guatemala lacked key elements of Old World technology such as a functional wheel, horses, iron, steel, and gunpowder; they were also extremely susceptible to Old World diseases, against which they had no resistance. The Maya preferred raiding and ambush to large-scale warfare, using spears, arrows and wooden swords with inset obsidian blades; the Xinca of the southern coastal plain used poison on their arrows. In response to the use of Spanish cavalry, the highland Maya took to digging pits and lining them with wooden stakes.

== Historical sources ==
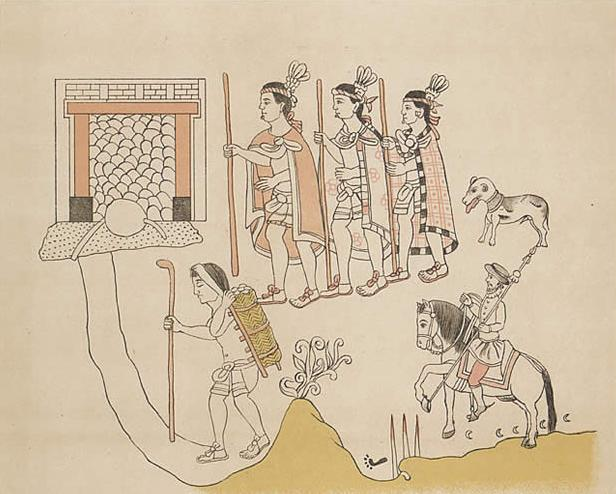
A page from the Lienzo de Tlaxcala, showing a Spanish conquistador accompanied by Tlaxcalan allies and a native porter

The sources describing the Spanish conquest of Guatemala include those written by the Spanish themselves, among them two of four letters written by conquistador Pedro de Alvarado to Hernán Cortés in 1524, describing the initial campaign to subjugate the Guatemalan Highlands. These letters were despatched to Tenochtitlan, addressed to Cortés but with a royal audience in mind; two of these letters are now lost. Gonzalo de Alvarado y Chávez was Pedro de Alvarado's cousin; he accompanied him on his first campaign in Guatemala and in 1525 he became the chief constable of Santiago de los Caballeros de Guatemala, the newly founded Spanish capital. Gonzalo wrote an account that mostly supports that of Pedro de Alvarado. Pedro de Alvarado's brother Jorge wrote another account to the king of Spain that explained it was his own campaign of 1527–1529 that established the Spanish colony. Bernal Díaz del Castillo wrote a lengthy account of the conquest of Mexico and neighbouring regions, the Historia verdadera de la conquista de la Nueva España ("True History of the Conquest of New Spain"); his account of the conquest of Guatemala generally agrees with that of the Alvarados. His account was finished around 1568, some 40 years after the campaigns it describes. Hernán Cortés described his expedition to Honduras in the fifth letter of his Cartas de Relación, in which he details his crossing of what is now Guatemala's Petén Department. Dominican friar Bartolomé de las Casas wrote a highly critical account of the Spanish conquest of the Americas and included accounts of some incidents in Guatemala. The Brevísima Relación de la Destrucción de las Indias ("Short Account of the Destruction of the Indies") was first published in 1552 in Seville.

The Tlaxcalan allies of the Spanish who accompanied them in their invasion of Guatemala wrote their own accounts of the conquest; these included a letter to the Spanish king protesting at their poor treatment once the campaign was over. Other accounts were in the form of questionnaires answered before colonial magistrates to protest and register a claim for recompense. Two pictorial accounts painted in the stylised indigenous pictographic tradition have survived; these are the Lienzo de Quauhquechollan, which was probably painted in Ciudad Vieja in the 1530s, and the Lienzo de Tlaxcala, painted in Tlaxcala.

Accounts of the conquest as seen from the point of view of the defeated highland Maya kingdoms are included in a number of indigenous documents, including the Annals of the Kaqchikels, which includes the Xajil Chronicle describing the history of the Kaqchikel from their mythical creation down through the Spanish conquest and continuing to 1619. A letter from the defeated Tzʼutujil Maya nobility of Santiago Atitlán to the Spanish king written in 1571 details the exploitation of the subjugated peoples.

Francisco Antonio de Fuentes y Guzmán was a colonial Guatemalan historian of Spanish descent who wrote La Recordación Florida, also called Historia de Guatemala (History of Guatemala). The book was written in 1690 and is regarded as one of the most important works of Guatemalan history, and is the first such book to have been written by a criollo author. Field investigation has tended to support the estimates of indigenous population and army sizes given by Fuentes y Guzmán.

== Background ==
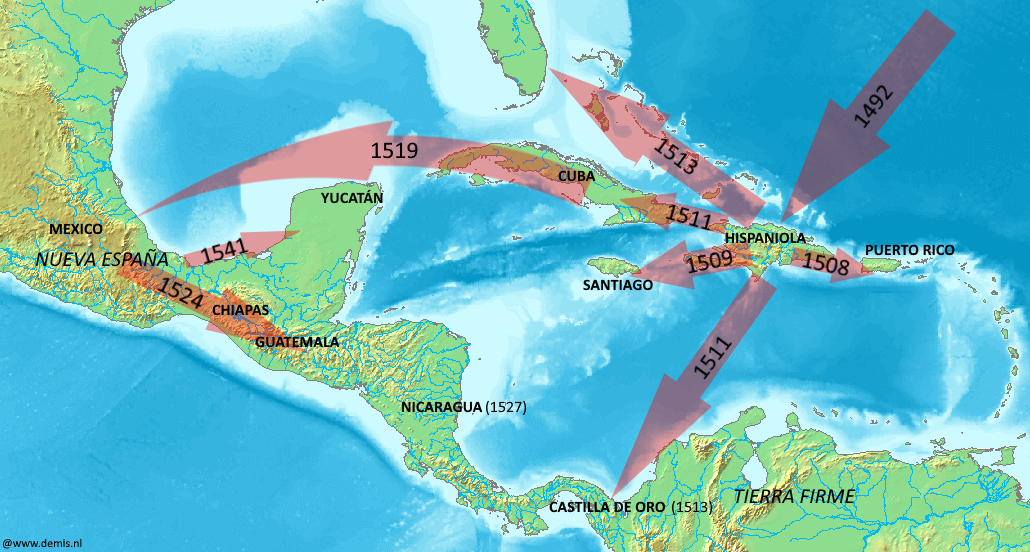
Spanish expansion routes in the Caribbean during the early 16th century

Christopher Columbus discovered the New World for the Kingdom of Castile and León in 1492. Private adventurers thereafter entered into contracts with the Spanish Crown to conquer the newly discovered lands in return for tax revenues and the power to rule. In the first decades after the discovery of the new lands, the Spanish colonised the Caribbean and established a centre of operations on the island of Cuba. They heard rumours of the rich empire of the Aztecs on the mainland to the west and, in 1519, Hernán Cortés set sail with eleven ships to explore the Mexican coast. By August 1521 the Aztec capital of Tenochtitlan had fallen to the Spanish and their allies. A single soldier arriving in Mexico in 1520 was carrying smallpox and thus initiated the devastating plagues that swept through the native populations of the Americas. Within three years of the fall of Tenochtitlan the Spanish had conquered a large part of Mexico, extending as far south as the Isthmus of Tehuantepec. The newly conquered territory became New Spain, headed by a viceroy who answered to the king of Spain via the Council of the Indies. Hernán Cortés received reports of rich, populated lands to the south and dispatched Pedro de Alvarado to investigate the region.

=== Preparations ===
In the run-up to the announcement that an invasion force was to be sent to Guatemala, 10,000 Nahua warriors had already been assembled by the Aztec emperor Cuauhtémoc to accompany the Spanish expedition. Warriors were ordered to be gathered from each of the Mexica and Tlaxcaltec towns. The native warriors supplied their weapons, including swords, clubs and bows and arrows. Alvarado's army left Tenochtitlan at the beginning of the dry season, sometime between the second half of November and December 1523. As Alvarado left the Aztec capital, he led about 400 Spanish and approximately 200 Tlaxcalan and Cholulan warriors and 100 Mexica, meeting up with the gathered reinforcements on the way. When the army left the Basin of Mexico, it may have included as many as 20,000 native warriors from various kingdoms, although the exact numbers are disputed. By the time the army crossed the Isthmus of Tehuantepec, the massed native warriors included 800 from Tlaxcala, 400 from Huejotzingo, 1,600 from Tepeaca plus many more from other former Aztec territories. Further Mesoamerican warriors were recruited from the Zapotec and Mixtec provinces, with the addition of more Nahuas from the Aztec garrison in Soconusco.

== Guatemala before the conquest ==
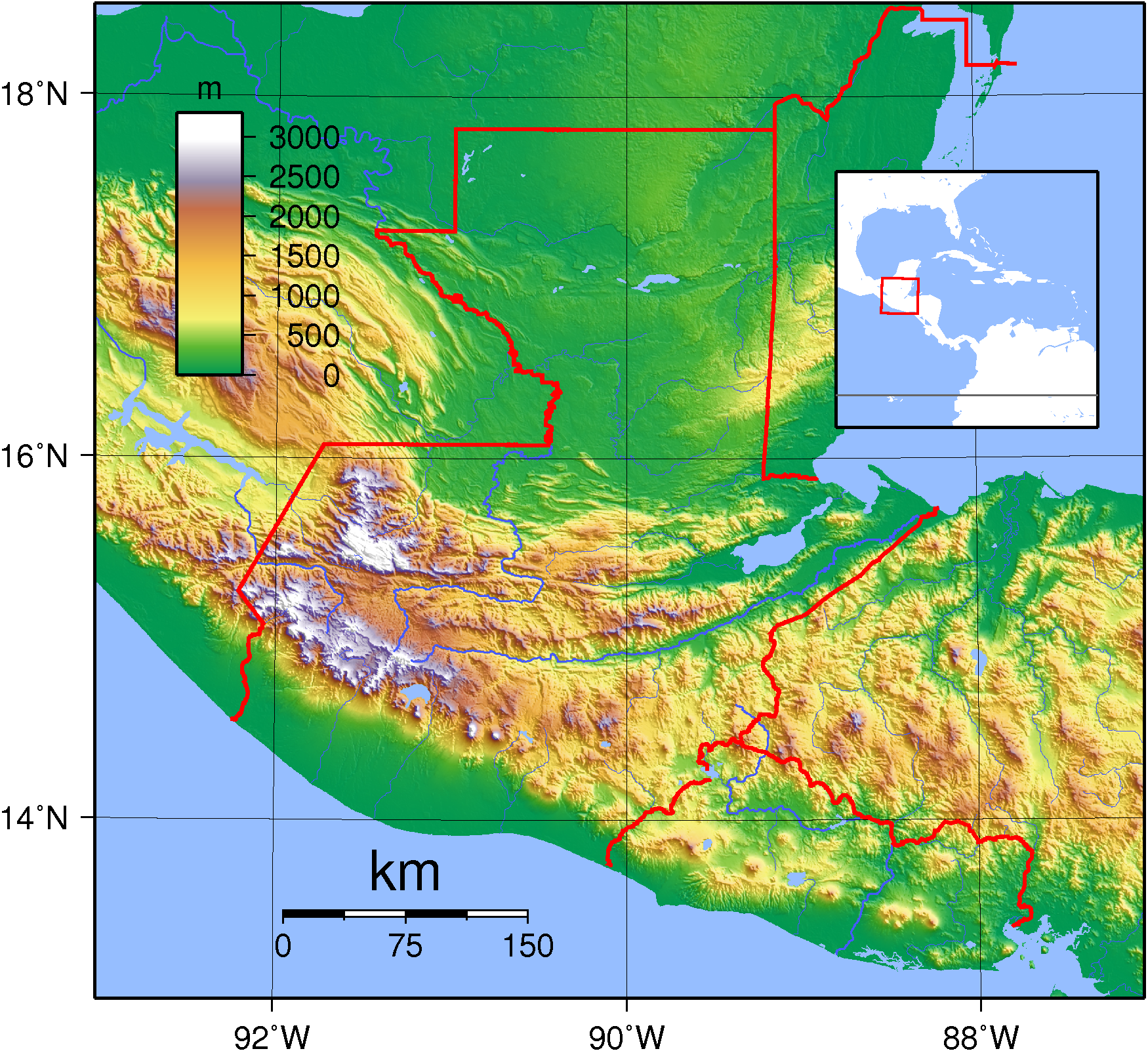
Relief map of Guatemala showing the three broad geographical areas: the southern Pacific lowlands, the highlands and the northern Petén lowlands

In the early 16th century the territory that now makes up Guatemala was divided into various competing polities, each locked in continual struggle with its neighbours. The most important were the Kʼicheʼ, the Kaqchikel, the Tzʼutujil, the Chajoma, the Mam, the Poqomam and the Pipil. All were Maya groups except for the Pipil, who were a Nahua group related to the Aztecs; the Pipil had a number of small city-states along the Pacific coastal plain of southern Guatemala and El Salvador. The Pipil of Guatemala had their capital at Itzcuintepec. The Xinca were another non-Maya group occupying the southeastern Pacific coastal area. The Maya had never been unified as a single empire, but by the time the Spanish arrived Maya civilization was thousands of years old and had already seen the rise and fall of great cities.

On the eve of the conquest the highlands of Guatemala were dominated by several powerful Maya states. In the centuries preceding the arrival of the Spanish the Kʼicheʼ had carved out a small empire covering a large part of the western Guatemalan Highlands and the neighbouring Pacific coastal plain. However, in the late 15th century the Kaqchikel rebelled against their former Kʼicheʼ allies and founded a new kingdom to the southeast with Iximche as its capital. In the decades before the Spanish invasion the Kaqchikel kingdom had been steadily eroding the kingdom of the Kʼicheʼ. Other highland groups included the Tzʼutujil around Lake Atitlán, the Mam in the western highlands and the Poqomam in the eastern highlands.

The kingdom of the Itza was the most powerful polity in the Petén lowlands of northern Guatemala, centred on their capital Nojpetén, on an island in Lake Petén Itzá. (Note: While most sources accept the modern town of Flores on Lake Petén Itzá as the location of Nojpetén/Tayasal, Arlen Chase argued that this identification is incorrect and that descriptions of Nojpetén correspond better to the archaeological site of Topoxte on Lake Yaxha. Chase 1976. See also the detailed rebuttal by Jones, Rice and Rice 1981.) The second polity in importance was that of their hostile neighbours, the Kowoj. The Kowoj were located to the east of the Itza, around the eastern lakes: Lake Salpetén, Lake Macanché, Lake Yaxhá and Lake Sacnab. Other groups are less well known and their precise territorial extent and political makeup remains obscure; among them were the Chinamita, the Kejache, the Icaiche, the Lakandon Chʼol, the Mopan, the Manche Chʼol and the Yalain. The Kejache occupied an area north of the lake on the route to Campeche, while the Mopan and the Chinamita had their polities in the southeastern Petén. The Manche territory was to the southwest of the Mopan. The Yalain had their territory immediately to the east of Lake Petén Itzá.

=== Native weapons and tactics ===
Maya warfare was not so much aimed at destruction of the enemy as the seizure of captives and plunder. The Spanish described the weapons of war of the Petén Maya as bows and arrows, fire-sharpened poles, flint-headed spears and two-handed swords crafted from strong wood with the blade fashioned from inset obsidian, similar to the Aztec macuahuitl. Pedro de Alvarado described how the Xinca of the Pacific coast attacked the Spanish with spears, stakes and poisoned arrows. Maya warriors wore body armour in the form of quilted cotton that had been soaked in salt water to toughen it; the resulting armour compared favourably to the steel armour worn by the Spanish. The Maya had historically employed ambush and raiding as their preferred tactic, and its employment against the Spanish proved troublesome for the Europeans. In response to the use of cavalry, the highland Maya took to digging pits on the roads, lining them with fire-hardened stakes and camouflaging them with grass and weeds, a tactic that according to the Kaqchikel killed many horses.

== Conquistadors ==
We came here to serve God and the King, and also to get rich. (Note: In the original this reads: ...por servir a Dios y a Su Majestad, e dar luz a los questaban en tinieblas, y también por haber riquezas, que todos los hombres comúnmente venimos a buscar. "(...those who died) to serve God and His Majesty, and to bring light to those who were in darkness, and also because there were riches, that all of us came in search of." Díaz del Castillo 1632, 2004, p. 720. Chapter CCX: De otras cosas y proyectos que se han seguido de nuestras ilustres conquistas y trabajos "Of other things and projects that have come about from our illustrious conquests and labours".)

— Bernal Díaz del Castillo

The conquistadors were all volunteers, the majority of whom did not receive a fixed salary but instead a portion of the spoils of victory, in the form of precious metals, land grants and provision of native labour. Many of the Spanish were already experienced soldiers who had previously campaigned in Europe. The initial incursion into Guatemala was led by Pedro de Alvarado, who earned the military title of Adelantado in 1527; he answered to the Spanish crown via Hernán Cortés in Mexico. Other early conquistadors included Pedro de Alvarado's brothers Gómez de Alvarado, Jorge de Alvarado and Gonzalo de Alvarado y Contreras; and his cousins Gonzalo de Alvarado y Chávez, Hernando de Alvarado and Diego de Alvarado. Pedro de Portocarrero was a nobleman who joined the initial invasion. Bernal Díaz del Castillo was a petty nobleman who accompanied Hernán Cortés when he crossed the northern lowlands, and Pedro de Alvarado on his invasion of the highlands. In addition to Spaniards, the invasion force probably included dozens of armed African slaves and freedmen.

=== Spanish weapons and tactics ===
Spanish weaponry and tactics differed greatly from that of the indigenous peoples of Guatemala. This included the Spanish use of crossbows, firearms (including muskets and cannon), war dogs and war horses. Among Mesoamerican peoples the capture of prisoners was a priority, while to the Spanish such taking of prisoners was a hindrance to outright victory. The inhabitants of Guatemala, for all their sophistication, lacked key elements of Old World technology, such as the use of iron and steel and functional wheels. The use of steel swords was perhaps the greatest technological advantage held by the Spanish, although the deployment of cavalry helped them to rout indigenous armies on occasion. The Spanish were sufficiently impressed by the quilted cotton armour of their Maya enemies that they adopted it in preference to their own steel armour. The conquistadors applied a more effective military organisation and strategic awareness than their opponents, allowing them to deploy troops and supplies in a way that increased the Spanish advantage.

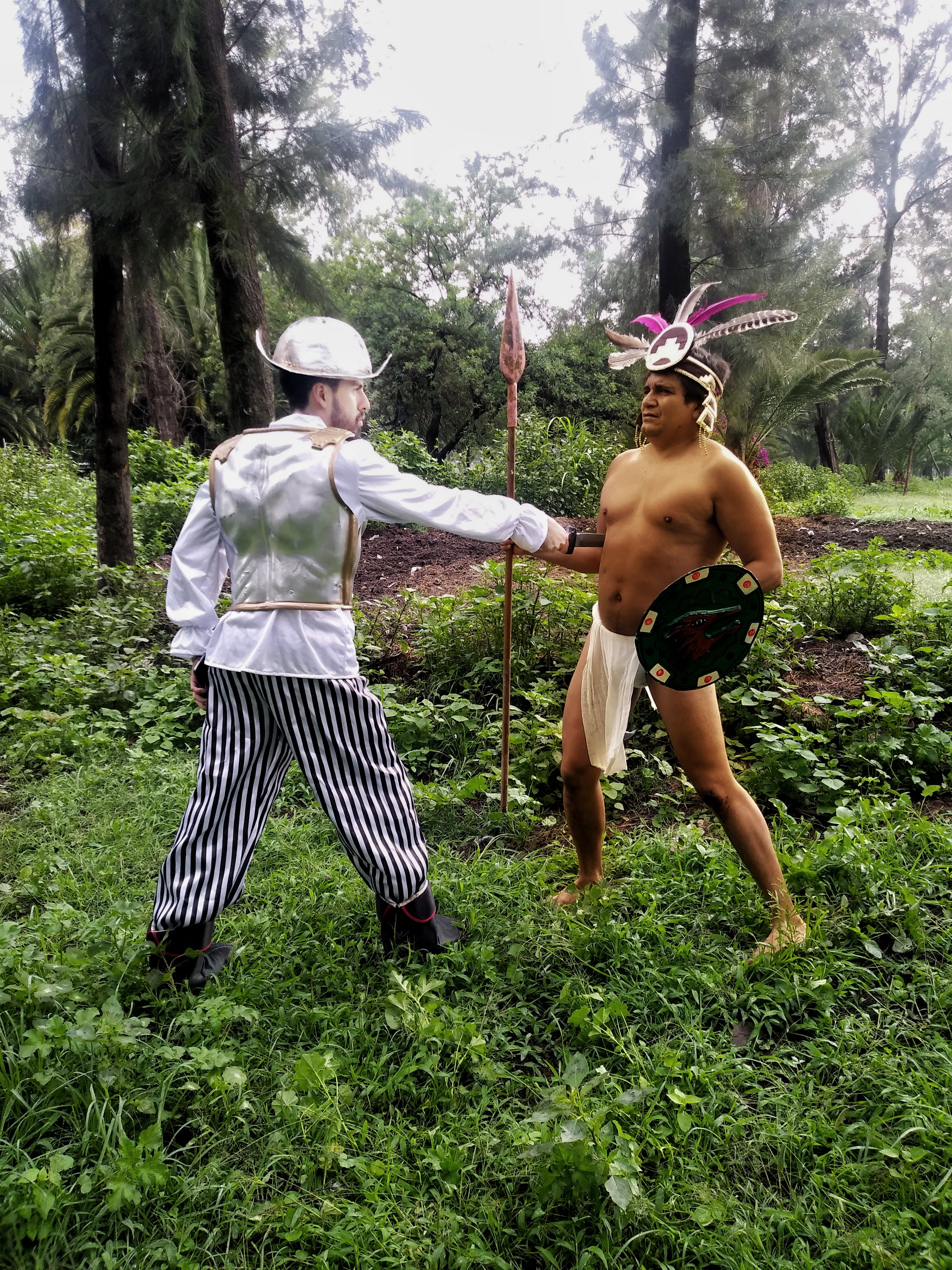
Representation of a battle between a native and a conquistador.

In Guatemala the Spanish routinely fielded indigenous allies; at first these were Nahuas brought from the recently conquered Mexico, later they also included Mayas. It is estimated that for every Spaniard on the field of battle, there were at least 10 native auxiliaries. Sometimes there were as many as 30 indigenous warriors for every Spaniard, and it was the participation of these Mesoamerican allies that was particularly decisive. In at least one case, encomienda rights were granted to one of the Tlaxcalan leaders who came as allies, and land grants and exemption from being given in encomienda were given to the Mexican allies as rewards for their participation in the conquest. In practice, such privileges were easily removed or sidestepped by the Spanish and the indigenous conquistadors were treated in a similar manner to the conquered natives.

The Spanish engaged in a strategy of concentrating native populations in newly founded colonial towns, or reducciones (also known as congregaciones). Native resistance to the new nucleated settlements took the form of the flight of the indigenous inhabitants into inaccessible regions such as mountains and forests.

== Impact of Old World diseases ==
Epidemics accidentally introduced by the Spanish included smallpox, measles and influenza. These diseases, together with typhus and yellow fever, had a major impact on Maya populations. The Old World diseases brought with the Spanish and against which the indigenous New World peoples had no resistance were a deciding factor in the conquest; the diseases crippled armies and decimated populations before battles were even fought. Their introduction was catastrophic in the Americas; it is estimated that 90% of the indigenous population had been eliminated by disease within the first century of European contact.

In 1519 and 1520, before the arrival of the Spanish in the region, a number of epidemics swept through southern Guatemala. At the same time as the Spanish were occupied with the overthrow of the Aztec Empire, a devastating plague struck the Kaqchikel capital of Iximche, and the city of Qʼumarkaj, capital of the Kʼicheʼ, may also have suffered from the same epidemic. It is likely that the same combination of smallpox and a pulmonary plague swept across the entire Guatemalan Highlands. Modern knowledge of the impact of these diseases on populations with no prior exposure suggests that 33–50% of the population of the highlands perished. Population levels in the Guatemalan Highlands did not recover to their pre-conquest levels until the middle of the 20th century. In 1666 pestilence or murine typhus swept through what is now the department of Huehuetenango. Smallpox was reported in San Pedro Saloma, in 1795. At the time of the fall of Nojpetén in 1697, there are estimated to have been 60,000 Mayas living around Lake Petén Itzá, including a large number of refugees from other areas. It is estimated that 88% of them died during the first ten years of colonial rule owing to a combination of disease and war.

== Conquest of the highlands ==
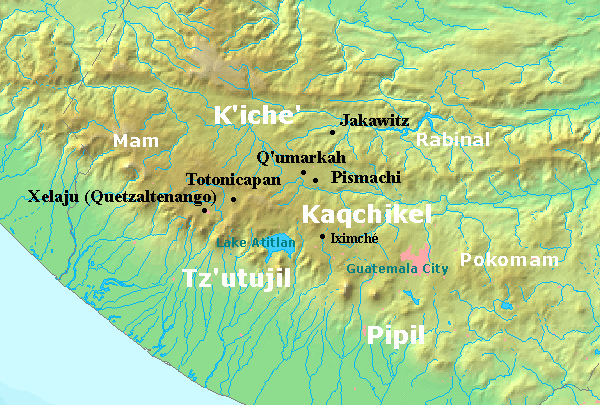
Map of the Guatemalan Highlands on the eve of the Spanish conquest

The conquest of the highlands was made difficult by the many independent polities in the region, rather than one powerful enemy to be defeated as was the case in central Mexico. After the Aztec capital Tenochtitlan fell to the Spanish in 1521, the Kaqchikel Maya of Iximche sent envoys to Hernán Cortés to declare their allegiance to the new ruler of Mexico, and the Kʼicheʼ Maya of Qʼumarkaj may also have sent a delegation. In 1522 Cortés sent Mexican allies to scout the Soconusco region of lowland Chiapas, where they met new delegations from Iximche and Qʼumarkaj at Tuxpán; both of the powerful highland Maya kingdoms declared their loyalty to the king of Spain. But Cortés' allies in Soconusco soon informed him that the Kʼicheʼ and the Kaqchikel were not loyal, and were instead harassing Spain's allies in the region. Cortés decided to despatch Pedro de Alvarado with 180 cavalry, 300 infantry, crossbows, muskets, 4 cannons, large amounts of ammunition and gunpowder, and thousands of allied Mexican warriors from Tlaxcala, Cholula and other cities in central Mexico; they arrived in Soconusco in 1523. Pedro de Alvarado was infamous for the massacre of Aztec nobles in Tenochtitlan and, according to Bartolomé de las Casas, he committed further atrocities in the conquest of the Maya kingdoms in Guatemala. Some groups remained loyal to the Spanish once they had submitted to the conquest, such as the Tzʼutujil and the Kʼicheʼ of Quetzaltenango, and provided them with warriors to assist further conquest. Other groups soon rebelled however, and by 1526 numerous rebellions had engulfed the highlands.

=== Subjugation of the Kʼicheʼ ===
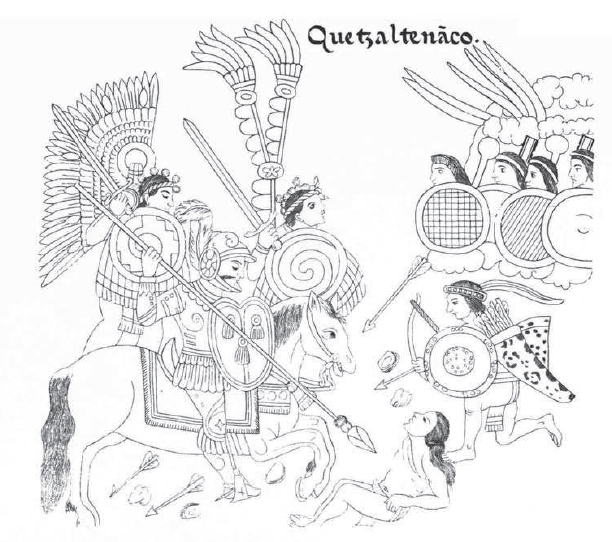
Page from the Lienzo de Tlaxcala showing the conquest of Quetzaltenango

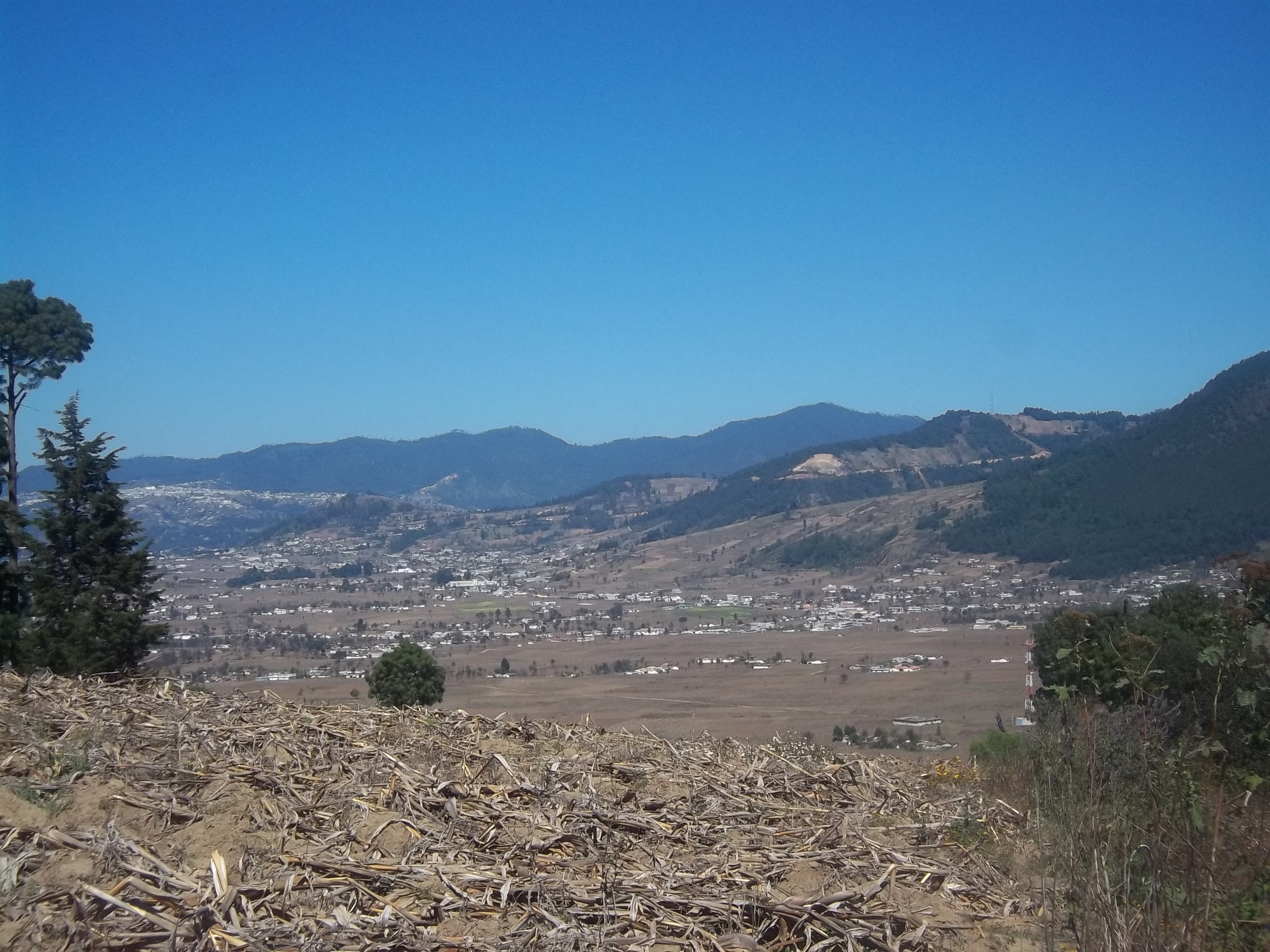
The Plains of Urbina, scene of a decisive battle against the Kʼicheʼ

... we waited until they came close enough to shoot their arrows, and then we smashed into them; as they had never seen horses, they grew very fearful, and we made a good advance ... and many of them died.

— Pedro de Alvarado describing the approach to Quetzaltenango in his 3rd letter to Hernán Cortés

Pedro de Alvarado and his army advanced along the Pacific coast unopposed until they reached the Samalá River in western Guatemala. This region formed a part of the Kʼicheʼ kingdom, and a Kʼicheʼ army tried unsuccessfully to prevent the Spanish from crossing the river. Once across, the conquistadors ransacked nearby settlements in an effort to terrorise the Kʼicheʼ. On 8 February 1524 Alvarado's army fought a battle at Xetulul, called Zapotitlán by his Mexican allies (modern San Francisco Zapotitlán). Although suffering many injuries inflicted by defending Kʼicheʼ archers, the Spanish and their allies stormed the town and set up camp in the marketplace. Alvarado then turned to head upriver into the Sierra Madre mountains towards the Kʼicheʼ heartlands, crossing the pass into the fertile valley of Quetzaltenango. On 12 February 1524 Alvarado's Mexican allies were ambushed in the pass and driven back by Kʼicheʼ warriors but the Spanish cavalry charge that followed was a shock for the Kʼicheʼ, who had never before seen horses. The cavalry scattered the Kʼicheʼ and the army crossed to the city of Xelaju (modern Quetzaltenango) only to find it deserted. Although the common view is that the Kʼicheʼ prince Tecun Uman died in the later battle near Olintepeque, the Spanish accounts are clear that at least one and possibly two of the lords of Qʼumarkaj died in the fierce battles upon the initial approach to Quetzaltenango. The death of Tecun Uman is said to have taken place in the battle of El Pinar, and local tradition has his death taking place on the Llanos de Urbina (Plains of Urbina), upon the approach to Quetzaltenango near the modern village of Cantel. Pedro de Alvarado, in his third letter to Hernán Cortés, describes the death of one of the four lords of Qʼumarkaj upon the approach to Quetzaltenango. The letter was dated 11 April 1524 and was written during his stay at Qʼumarkaj. Almost a week later, on 18 February 1524, a Kʼicheʼ army confronted the Spanish army in the Quetzaltenango valley and were comprehensively defeated; many Kʼicheʼ nobles were among the dead. Such were the numbers of Kʼicheʼ dead that Olintepeque was given the name Xequiquel, roughly meaning "bathed in blood". In the early 17th century, the grandson of the Kʼicheʼ king informed the alcalde mayor (the highest colonial official at the time) that the Kʼicheʼ army that had marched out of Qʼumarkaj to confront the invaders numbered 30,000 warriors, a claim that is considered credible by modern scholars. This battle exhausted the Kʼicheʼ militarily and they asked for peace and offered tribute, inviting Pedro de Alvarado into their capital Qʼumarkaj, which was known as Tecpan Utatlan to the Nahuatl-speaking allies of the Spanish. Alvarado was deeply suspicious of the Kʼicheʼ intentions but accepted the offer and marched to Qʼumarkaj with his army.

The day after the battle of Olintepeque, the Spanish army arrived at Tzakahá, which submitted peacefully. There the Spanish chaplains Juan Godínez and Juan Díaz conducted a Roman Catholic mass under a makeshift roof; this site was chosen to build the first church in Guatemala, which was dedicated to Concepción La Conquistadora. Tzakahá was renamed as San Luis Salcajá. The first Easter mass held in Guatemala was celebrated in the new church, during which high-ranking natives were baptised.

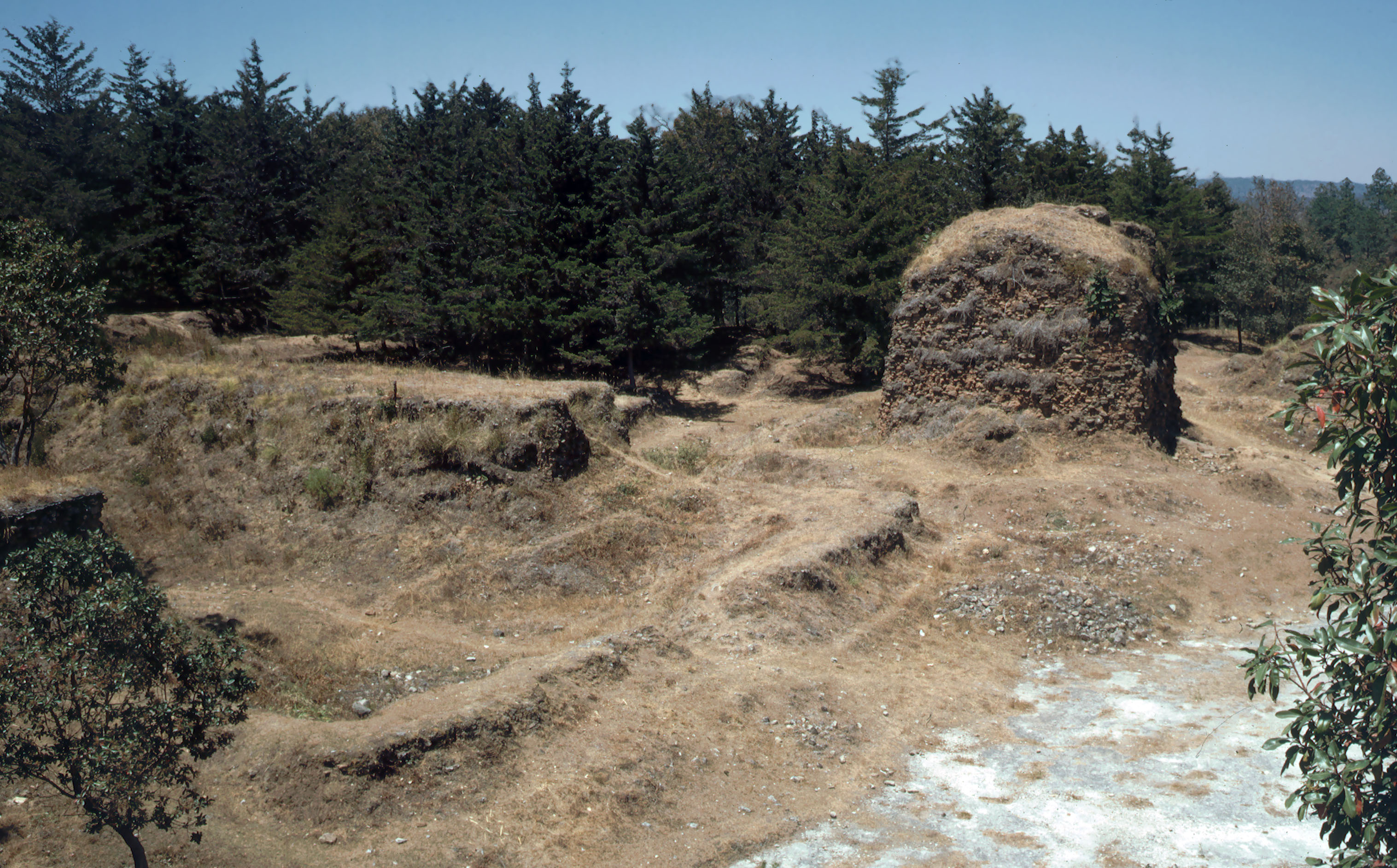
Qʼumarkaj was the capital of the Kʼicheʼ kingdom until it was burnt by the invading Spanish.

In March 1524 Pedro de Alvarado entered Qʼumarkaj at the invitation of the remaining lords of the Kʼicheʼ after their catastrophic defeat, fearing that he was entering a trap. He encamped on the plain outside the city rather than accepting lodgings inside. Fearing the great number of Kʼicheʼ warriors gathered outside the city and that his cavalry would not be able to manoeuvre in the narrow streets of Qʼumarkaj, he invited the leading lords of the city, Oxib-Keh (the ajpop, or king) and Beleheb-Tzy (the ajpop kʼamha, or king elect) to visit him in his camp. As soon as they did so, he seized them and kept them as prisoners in his camp. The Kʼicheʼ warriors, seeing their lords taken prisoner, attacked the Spaniards' indigenous allies and managed to kill one of the Spanish soldiers. At this point Alvarado decided to have the captured Kʼicheʼ lords burnt to death, and then proceeded to burn the entire city. After the destruction of Qʼumarkaj and the execution of its rulers, Pedro de Alvarado sent messages to Iximche, capital of the Kaqchikel, proposing an alliance against the remaining Kʼicheʼ resistance. Alvarado wrote that they sent 4,000 warriors to assist him, although the Kaqchikel recorded that they sent only 400.

=== San Marcos: Province of Tecusitlán and Lacandón ===
With the capitulation of the Kʼicheʼ kingdom, various non-Kʼicheʼ peoples under Kʼicheʼ dominion also submitted to the Spanish. This included the Mam inhabitants of the area now within the modern department of San (. Quetzaltenango and San Marcos were placed under the command of Juan de León y Cardona, who began the reduction of indigenous populations and the foundation of Spanish towns. The towns of San Marcos and San Pedro Sacatepéquez were founded soon after the conquest of western Guatemala. In 1533 Pedro de Alvarado ordered de León y Cardona to explore and conquer the area around the Tacaná, Tajumulco, Lacandón and San Antonio volcanoes; in colonial times this area was referred to as the Province of Tecusitlán and Lacandón. De León marched to a Maya city named Quezalli by his Nahuatl-speaking allies with a force of fifty Spaniards; his Mexican allies also referred to the city by the name Sacatepequez. De León renamed the city as San Pedro Sacatepéquez in honour of his friar, Pedro de Angulo. The Spanish founded a village nearby at Candacuchex in April that year, renaming it as San Marcos.

=== Kaqchikel alliance ===
On 14 April 1524, soon after the defeat of the Kʼicheʼ, the Spanish were invited into Iximche and were well received by the lords Belehe Qat and Cahi Imox. (Note: Recinos places all these dates two days earlier (e.g. the Spanish arrival at Iximche on 12 April rather than 14 April) based on vague dating in Spanish primary records. Schele and Fahsen calculated all dates on the more securely dated Kaqchikel annals, where equivalent dates are often given in both the Kaqchikel and Spanish calendars. The Schele and Fahsen dates are used in this section. Schele & Mathews 1999, p. 386. n. 15.) The Kaqchikel kings provided native soldiers to assist the conquistadors against continuing Kʼicheʼ resistance and to help with the defeat of the neighbouring Tzʼutuhil kingdom. The Spanish only stayed briefly in Iximche before continuing through Atitlán, Escuintla and Cuscatlán. The Spanish returned to the Kaqchikel capital on 23 July 1524 and on 27 July (1 Qʼat in the Kaqchikel calendar) Pedro de Alvarado declared Iximche as the first capital of Guatemala, Santiago de los Caballeros de Guatemala ("St. James of the Knights of Guatemala"). Iximche was called Guatemala by the Spanish, from the Nahuatl Quauhtemallan meaning "forested land". Since the Spanish conquistadors founded their first capital at Iximche, they took the name of the city used by their Nahuatl-speaking Mexican allies and applied it to the new Spanish city and, by extension, to the kingdom. From this comes the modern name of the country. When Pedro de Alvarado moved his army to Iximche, he left the defeated Kʼicheʼ kingdom under the command of Juan de León y Cardona. Although de León y Cardona was given command of the western reaches of the new colony, he continued to take an active role in the continuing conquest, including the later assault on the Poqomam capital.

=== Conquest of the Tzʼutujil ===
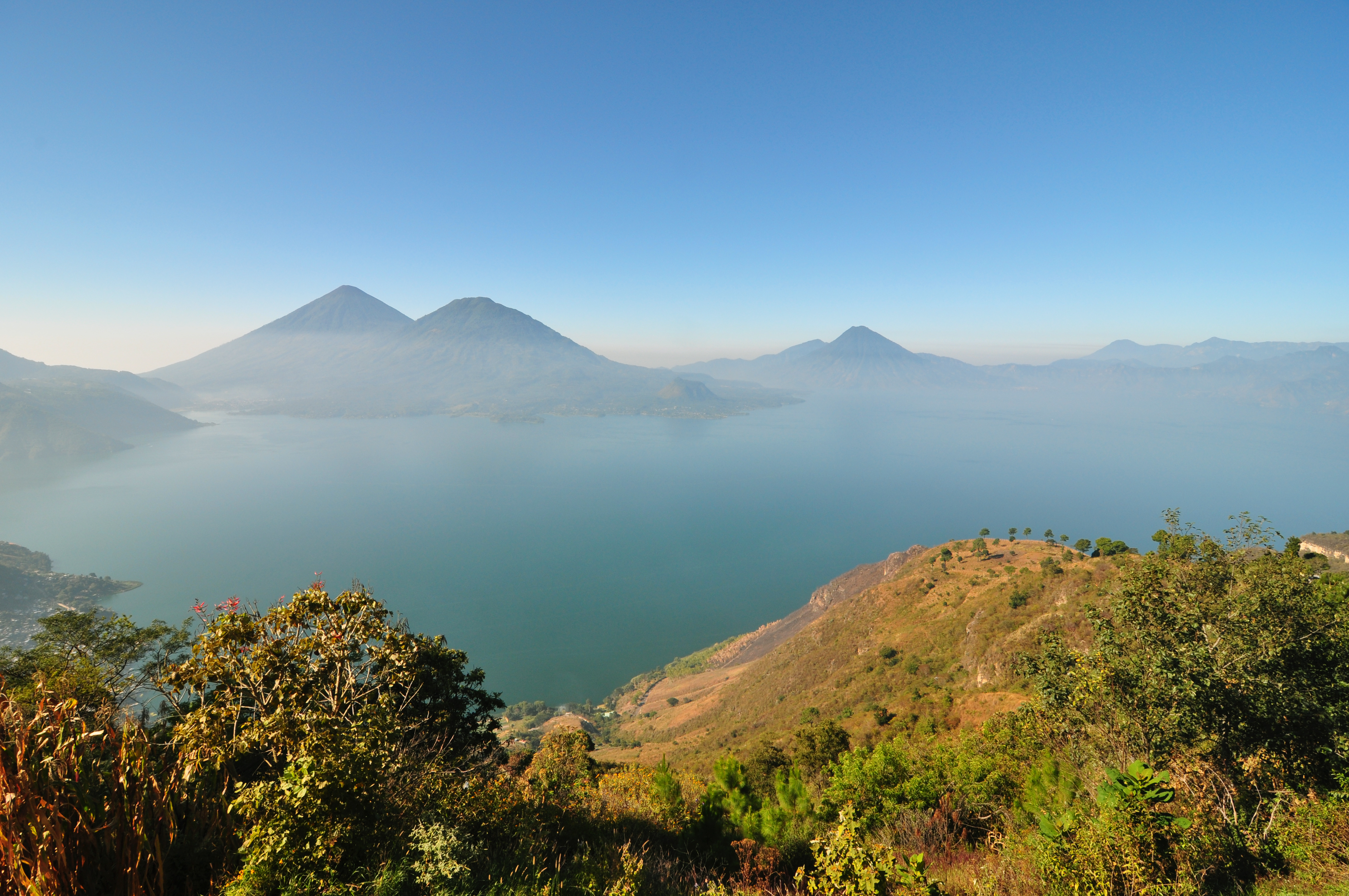
The Tzʼutujil kingdom had its capital on the shore of Lake Atitlán.

The Kaqchikel appear to have entered into an alliance with the Spanish to defeat their enemies, the Tzʼutujil, whose capital was Tecpan Atitlan. Pedro de Alvarado sent two Kaqchikel messengers to Tecpan Atitlan at the request of the Kaqchikel lords, both of whom were killed by the Tzʼutujil. When news of the killing of the messengers reached the Spanish at Iximche, the conquistadors marched against the Tzʼutujil with their Kaqchikel allies. Pedro de Alvarado left Iximche just 5 days after he had arrived there, with 60 cavalry, 150 Spanish infantry and an unspecified number of Kaqchikel warriors. The Spanish and their allies arrived at the lakeshore after a day's hard march, without encountering any opposition. Seeing the lack of resistance, Alvarado rode ahead with 30 cavalry along the lakeshore. Opposite a populated island the Spanish at last encountered hostile Tzʼutujil warriors and charged among them, scattering and pursuing them to a narrow causeway across which the surviving Tzʼutujil fled. The causeway was too narrow for the horses, therefore the conquistadors dismounted and crossed to the island before the inhabitants could break the bridges. The rest of Alvarado's army soon reinforced his party and they successfully stormed the island. The surviving Tzʼutujil fled into the lake and swam to safety on another island. The Spanish could not pursue the survivors further because 300 canoes sent by the Kaqchikels had not yet arrived. This battle took place on 18 April.

The following day the Spanish entered Tecpan Atitlan but found it deserted. Pedro de Alvarado camped in the centre of the city and sent out scouts to find the enemy. They managed to catch some locals and used them to send messages to the Tzʼutujil lords, ordering them to submit to the king of Spain. The Tzʼutujil leaders responded by surrendering to Pedro de Alvarado and swearing loyalty to Spain, at which point Alvarado considered them pacified and returned to Iximche. Three days after Pedro de Alvarado returned to Iximche, the lords of the Tzʼutujil arrived there to pledge their loyalty and offer tribute to the conquistadors. A short time afterwards a number of lords arrived from the Pacific lowlands to swear allegiance to the king of Spain, although Alvarado did not name them in his letters; they confirmed Kaqchikel reports that further out on the Pacific plain was the kingdom called Izcuintepeque in Nahuatl, or Panatacat in Kaqchikel, whose inhabitants were warlike and hostile towards their neighbours.

=== Kaqchikel rebellion ===
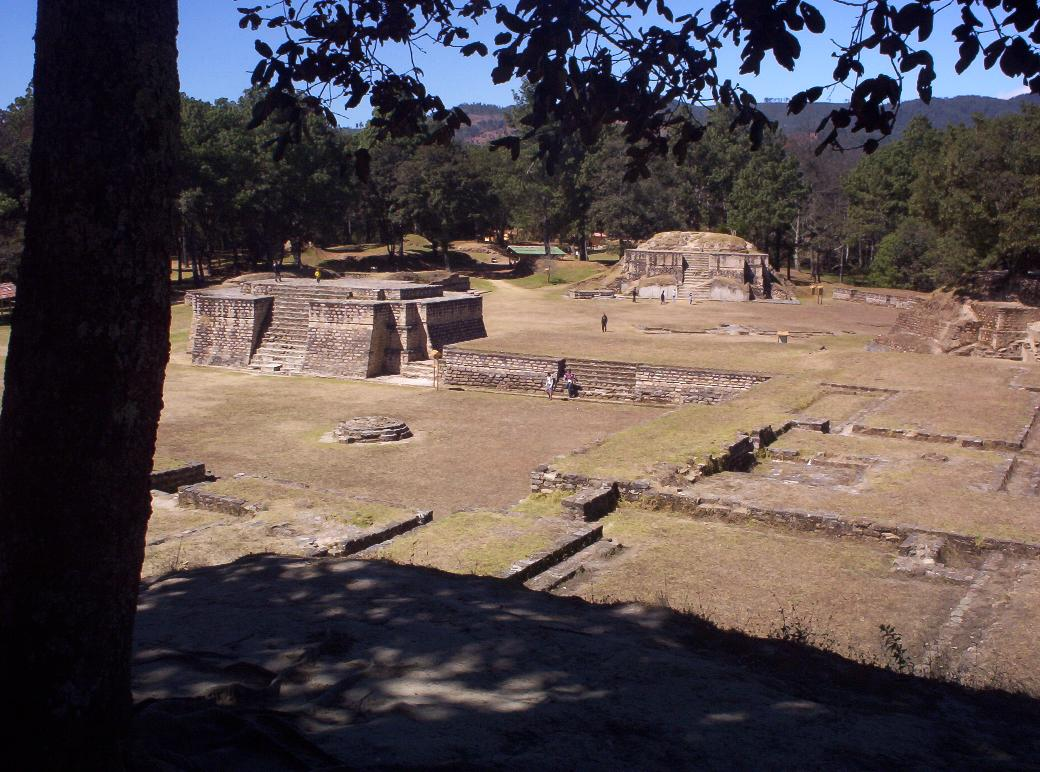
The ruins of Iximche, burnt by Spanish deserters

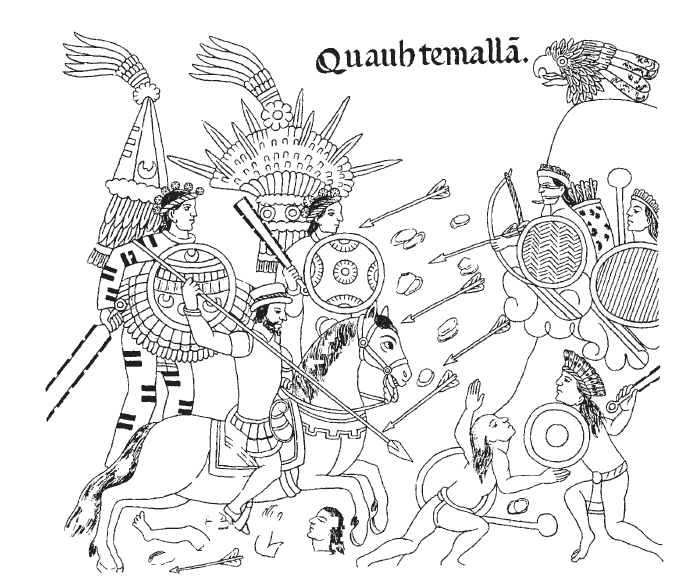
Page from the Lienzo de Tlaxcala depicting the conquest of Iximche

Pedro de Alvarado rapidly began to demand gold in tribute from the Kaqchikels, souring the friendship between the two peoples. He demanded that their kings deliver 1000 gold leaves, each worth 15 pesos. (Note: A peso was a Spanish coin. One peso was worth eight reales (the source of the term "pieces of eight") or two tostones. During the conquest, a peso contained 4.6 grams (0.16 oz) of gold. Lovell 2005, p. 223. Recinos 1952, 1986, p. 52. n. 25.)

A Kaqchikel priest foretold that the Kaqchikel gods would destroy the Spanish, causing the Kaqchikel people to abandon their city and flee to the forests and hills on 28 August 1524 (7 Ahmak in the Kaqchikel calendar). Ten days later the Spanish declared war on the Kaqchikel. Two years later, on 9 February 1526, a group of sixteen Spanish deserters burnt the palace of the Ahpo Xahil, sacked the temples and kidnapped a priest, acts that the Kaqchikel blamed on Pedro de Alvarado. (Note: Recinos 1998, p. 19. gives sixty deserters.) Conquistador Bernal Díaz del Castillo recounted how in 1526 he returned to Iximche and spent the night in the "old city of Guatemala" together with Luis Marín and other members of Hernán Cortés's expedition to Honduras. He reported that the houses of the city were still in excellent condition; his account was the last description of the city while it was still inhabitable.

The Kaqchikel began to fight the Spanish. They opened shafts and pits for the horses and put sharp stakes in them to kill them ... Many Spanish and their horses died in the horse traps. Many Kʼicheʼ and Tzʼutujil also died; in this way the Kaqchikel destroyed all these peoples.

— Annals of the Kaqchikels

The Spanish founded a new town at nearby Tecpán Guatemala; Tecpán is Nahuatl for "palace", thus the name of the new town translated as "the palace among the trees". The Spanish abandoned Tecpán in 1527, because of the continuous Kaqchikel attacks, and moved to the Almolonga Valley to the east, refounding their capital on the site of today's San Miguel Escobar district of Ciudad Vieja, near Antigua Guatemala. The Nahua and Oaxacan allies of the Spanish settled in what is now central Ciudad Vieja, then known as Almolonga (not to be confused with Almolonga near Quetzaltenango); Zapotec and Mixtec allies also settled San Gaspar Vivar about 2 kilometres (1.2 mi) northeast of Almolonga, which they founded in 1530.

The Kaqchikel kept up resistance against the Spanish for a number of years, but on 9 May 1530, exhausted by the warfare that had seen the deaths of their best warriors and the enforced abandonment of their crops, the two kings of the most important clans returned from the wilds. A day later they were joined by many nobles and their families and many more people; they then surrendered at the new Spanish capital at Ciudad Vieja. The former inhabitants of Iximche were dispersed; some were moved to Tecpán, the rest to Sololá and other towns around Lake Atitlán.

=== Siege of Zaculeu ===
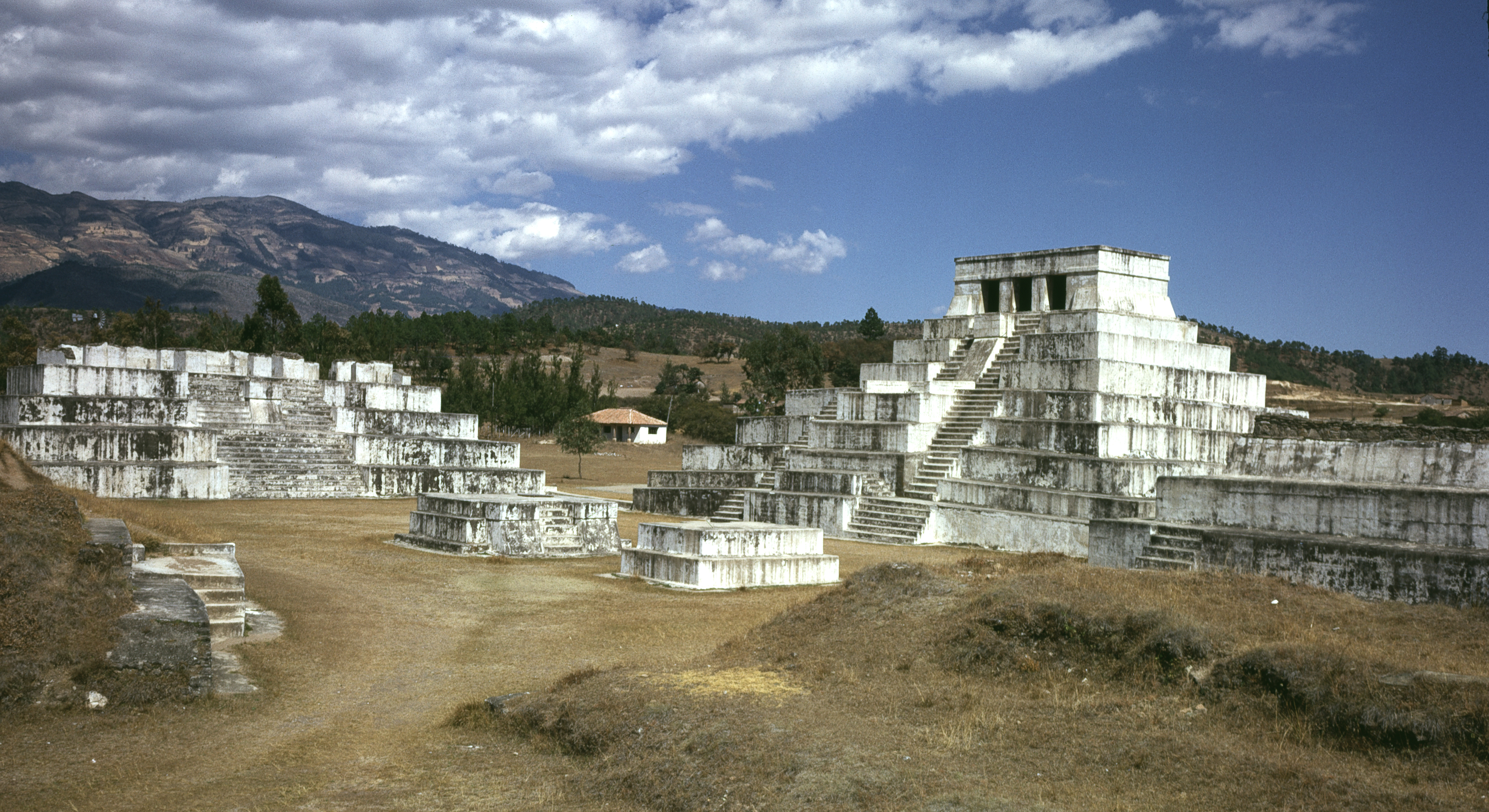
Zaculeu fell to Gonzalo de Alvarado y Contreras after a siege of several months.

Although a state of hostilities existed between the Mam and the Kʼicheʼ of Qʼumarkaj after the rebellion of the Kaqchikel against their former Kʼicheʼ allies prior to European contact, when the conquistadors arrived there was a shift in the political landscape. Pedro de Alvarado described how the Mam king Kaybʼil Bʼalam was received with great honour in Qʼumarkaj while he was there. The expedition against Zaculeu was apparently initiated after Kʼicheʼ bitterness at their failure to contain the Spanish at Qʼumarkaj, with the plan to trap the conquistadors in the city having been suggested to them by the Mam king, Kaybʼil Bʼalam; the resulting execution of the Kʼicheʼ kings was viewed as unjust. The Kʼicheʼ suggestion of marching on the Mam was quickly taken up by the Spanish.

At the time of the conquest, the main Mam population was situated in Xinabahul (also spelled Chinabjul), now the city of Huehuetenango, but Zaculeu's fortifications led to its use as a refuge during the conquest. The refuge was attacked by Gonzalo de Alvarado y Contreras, brother of conquistador Pedro de Alvarado, in 1525, with 40 Spanish cavalry and 80 Spanish infantry, and some 2,000 Mexican and Kʼicheʼ allies. Gonzalo de Alvarado left the Spanish camp at Tecpán Guatemala in July 1525 and marched to the town of Totonicapán, which he used as a supply base. From Totonicapán the expedition headed north to Momostenango, although it was delayed by heavy rains. Momostenango quickly fell to the Spanish after a four-hour battle. The following day Gonzalo de Alvarado marched on Huehuetenango and was confronted by a Mam army of 5,000 warriors from nearby Malacatán (modern Malacatancito). The Mam army advanced across the plain in battle formation and was met by a Spanish cavalry charge that threw them into disarray, with the infantry mopping up those Mam that survived the cavalry. Gonzalo de Alvarado slew the Mam leader Canil Acab with his lance, at which point the Mam army's resistance was broken, and the surviving warriors fled to the hills. Alvarado entered Malacatán unopposed to find it occupied only by the sick and the elderly. Messengers from the community's leaders arrived from the hills and offered their unconditional surrender, which was accepted by Alvarado. The Spanish army rested for a few days, then continued onwards to Huehuetenango only to find it deserted. Kaybʼil Bʼalam had received news of the Spanish advance and had withdrawn to his fortress at Zaculeu. Alvarado sent a message to Zaculeu proposing terms for the peaceful surrender of the Mam king, who chose not to answer.

Zaculeu was defended by Kaybʼil Bʼalam commanding some 6,000 warriors gathered from Huehuetenango, Zaculeu, Cuilco and Ixtahuacán. The fortress was surrounded on three sides by deep ravines and defended by a formidable system of walls and ditches. Gonzalo de Alvarado, although outnumbered two to one, decided to launch an assault on the weaker northern entrance. Mam warriors initially held the northern approaches against the Spanish infantry but fell back before repeated cavalry charges. The Mam defence was reinforced by an estimated 2,000 warriors from within Zaculeu but was unable to push the Spanish back. Kaybʼil Bʼalam, seeing that outright victory on an open battlefield was impossible, withdrew his army back within the safety of the walls. As Alvarado dug in and laid siege to the fortress, an army of approximately 8,000 Mam warriors descended on Zaculeu from the Cuchumatanes mountains to the north, drawn from those towns allied with the city. Alvarado left Antonio de Salazar to supervise the siege and marched north to confront the Mam army. The Mam army was disorganised, and although it was a match for the Spanish and allied foot soldiers, it was vulnerable to the repeated charges of the experienced Spanish cavalry. The relief army was broken and annihilated, allowing Alvarado to return to reinforce the siege. After several months the Mam were reduced to starvation. Kaybʼil Bʼalam finally surrendered the city to the Spanish in the middle of October 1525. When the Spanish entered the city they found 1,800 dead Indians, and the survivors eating the corpses of the dead. After the fall of Zaculeu, a Spanish garrison was established at Huehuetenango under the command of Gonzalo de Solís; Gonzalo de Alvarado returned to Tecpán Guatemala to report his victory to his brother.

=== Conquest of the Poqomam ===
In 1525 Pedro de Alvarado sent a small company to conquer Mixco Viejo (Chinautla Viejo), the capital of the Poqomam. (Note: The location of the historical city of Mixco Viejo has been the source of some confusion. The archaeological site now known as Mixco Viejo has been proven to be Jilotepeque Viejo, the capital of the Chajoma. The Mixco Viejo of colonial records has now been associated with the archaeological site of Chinautla Viejo, much closer to modern Mixco. Carmack 2001a, pp. 151, 158.) At the Spanish approach, the inhabitants remained enclosed in the fortified city. The Spanish attempted an approach from the west through a narrow pass but were forced back with heavy losses. Alvarado himself launched the second assault with 200 Tlaxcalan allies but was also beaten back. The Poqomam then received reinforcements, possibly from Chinautla, and the two armies clashed on open ground outside of the city. The battle was chaotic and lasted for most of the day but was finally decided by the Spanish cavalry, forcing the Poqomam reinforcements to withdraw. The leaders of the reinforcements surrendered to the Spanish three days after their retreat and revealed that the city had a secret entrance in the form of a cave leading up from a nearby river, allowing the inhabitants to come and go.

Armed with the knowledge gained from their prisoners, Alvarado sent 40 men to cover the exit from the cave and launched another assault along the ravine from the west, in single file owing to its narrowness, with crossbowmen alternating with soldiers bearing muskets, each with a companion sheltering him from arrows and stones with a shield. This tactic allowed the Spanish to break through the pass and storm the entrance of the city. The Poqomam warriors fell back in disorder in a chaotic retreat through the city, and were hunted down by the victorious conquistadors and their allies. Those who managed to retreat down the neighbouring valley were ambushed by Spanish cavalry who had been posted to block the exit from the cave, the survivors were captured and brought back to the city. The siege had lasted more than a month and because of the defensive strength of the city, Alvarado ordered it to be burned and moved the inhabitants to the new colonial village of Mixco.

=== Resettlement of the Chajoma ===
There are no direct sources describing the conquest of the Chajoma by the Spanish but it appears to have been a drawn-out campaign rather than a rapid victory. The only description of the conquest of the Chajoma is a secondary account appearing in the work of Francisco Antonio de Fuentes y Guzmán in the 17th century, long after the event. After the conquest, the inhabitants of the eastern part of the kingdom were relocated by the conquerors to San Pedro Sacatepéquez, including some of the inhabitants of the archaeological site now known as Mixco Viejo (Jilotepeque Viejo). The rest of the population of Mixco Viejo, together with the inhabitants of the western part of the kingdom, were moved to San Martín Jilotepeque. The Chajoma rebelled against the Spanish in 1526, fighting a battle at Ukubʼil, an unidentified site somewhere near the modern towns of San Juan Sacatepéquez and San Pedro Sacatepéquez. (Note: The rebellion and the Spanish response, led by Pedro de Portocarrero, is described in Part One Book 13 Chapter IV of the Recordación Florida.)

In the colonial period, most of the surviving Chajoma were forcibly settled in the towns of San Juan Sacatepéquez, San Pedro Sacatepéquez and San Martín Jilotepeque as a result of the Spanish policy of congregaciones; the people were moved to whichever of the three towns was closest to their pre-conquest land holdings. Some Iximche Kaqchikels seem also to have been relocated to the same towns. After their relocation some of the Chajoma drifted back to their pre-conquest centres, creating informal settlements and provoking hostilities with the Poqomam of Mixco and Chinautla along the former border between the pre-Columbian kingdoms. Some of these settlements eventually received official recognition, such as San Raimundo near Sacul.

=== El Progreso and Zacapa ===
The Spanish colonial corregimiento of San Cristóbal Acasaguastlán was established in 1551 with its seat in the town of that name, now in the eastern portion of the modern department of El Progreso. Acasaguastlán was one of few pre-conquest centres of population in the middle Motagua River drainage, due to the arid climate. It covered a broad area that included Cubulco, Rabinal, and Salamá (all in Baja Verapaz), San Agustín de la Real Corona (modern San Agustín Acasaguastlán) and La Magdalena in El Progreso, and Chimalapa, Gualán, Usumatlán and Zacapa, all in the department of Zacapa. Chimalapa, Gualán and Usumatlán were all satellite settlements of Acasaguastlán. San Cristóbal Acasaguastlán and the surrounding area were reduced into colonial settlements by friars of the Dominican Order; at the time of the conquest the area was inhabited by Poqomchiʼ Maya and by the Nahuatl-speaking Pipil. In the 1520s, immediately after conquest, the inhabitants paid taxes to the Spanish Crown in the form of cacao, textiles, gold, silver and slaves. Within a few decades taxes were instead paid in beans, cotton and maize. Acasaguastlán was first given in encomienda to conquistador Diego Salvatierra in 1526.

=== Chiquimula ===
Chiquimula de la Sierra ("Chiquimula in the Highlands"), occupying the area of the modern department of Chiquimula to the east of the Poqomam and Chajoma, was inhabited by Chʼortiʼ Maya at the time of the conquest. The first Spanish reconnaissance of this region took place in 1524 by an expedition that included Hernando de Chávez, Juan Durán, Bartolomé Becerra and Cristóbal Salvatierra, amongst others. In 1526 three Spanish captains, Juan Pérez Dardón, Sancho de Barahona and Bartolomé Becerra, invaded Chiquimula on the orders of Pedro de Alvarado. The indigenous population soon rebelled against excessive Spanish demands, but the rebellion was quickly put down in April 1530. However, the region was not considered fully conquered until a campaign by Jorge de Bocanegra in 1531–1532 that also took in parts of Jalapa. The afflictions of Old World diseases, war and overwork in the mines and encomiendas took a heavy toll on the inhabitants of eastern Guatemala, to the extent that indigenous population levels never recovered to their pre-conquest levels.

=== Campaigns in the Cuchumatanes ===
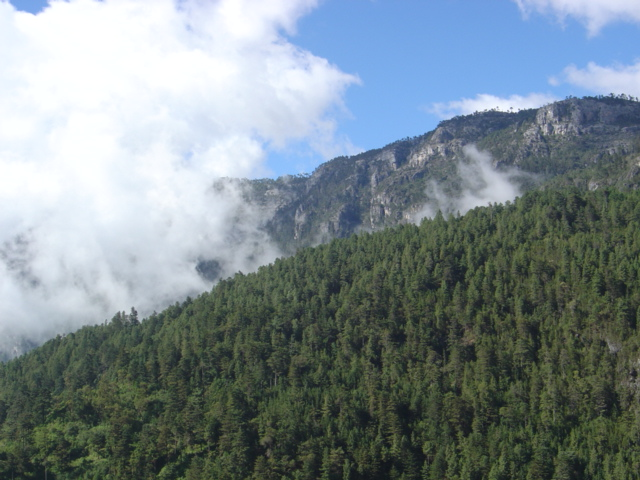
The difficult terrain and remoteness of the Cuchumatanes made their conquest difficult.

In the ten years after the fall of Zaculeu various Spanish expeditions crossed into the Sierra de los Cuchumatanes and engaged in the gradual and complex conquest of the Chuj and Qʼanjobʼal. The Spanish were attracted to the region in the hope of extracting gold, silver and other riches from the mountains but their remoteness, the difficult terrain and relatively low population made their conquest and exploitation extremely difficult. The population of the Cuchumatanes is estimated to have been 260,000 before European contact. By the time the Spanish physically arrived in the region this had collapsed to 150,000 because of the effects of the Old World diseases that had run ahead of them.

==== Uspantán and the Ixil ====
After the western portion of the Cuchumatanes fell to the Spanish, the Ixil and Uspantek Maya were sufficiently isolated to evade immediate Spanish attention. The Uspantek and the Ixil were allies and in 1529, four years after the conquest of Huehuetenango, Uspantek warriors were harassing Spanish forces and Uspantán was trying to foment rebellion among the Kʼicheʼ. Uspantek activity became sufficiently troublesome that the Spanish decided that military action was necessary. Gaspar Arias, magistrate of Guatemala, penetrated the eastern Cuchumatanes with 60 Spanish infantry and 300 allied indigenous warriors. By early September he had imposed temporary Spanish authority over the Ixil towns of Chajul and Nebaj. The Spanish army then marched east toward Uspantán itself; Arias then received notice that the acting governor of Guatemala, Francisco de Orduña, had deposed him as magistrate. Arias handed command over to the inexperienced Pedro de Olmos and returned to confront de Orduña. Although his officers advised against it, Olmos launched a disastrous full-scale frontal assault on the city. As soon as the Spanish began their assault they were ambushed from the rear by more than 2,000 Uspantek warriors. The Spanish forces were routed with heavy losses; many of their indigenous allies were slain, and many more were captured alive by the Uspantek warriors only to be sacrificed on the altar of their deity Exbalamquen. The survivors who managed to evade capture fought their way back to the Spanish garrison at Qʼumarkaj.

A year later Francisco de Castellanos set out from Santiago de los Caballeros de Guatemala (by now relocated to Ciudad Vieja) on another expedition against the Ixil and Uspantek, leading 8 corporals, 32 cavalry, 40 Spanish infantry and several hundred allied indigenous warriors. The expedition rested at Chichicastenango and recruited further forces before marching seven leagues northwards to Sacapulas and climbed the steep southern slopes of the Cuchumatanes. On the upper slopes they clashed with a force of 4,000-5,000 Ixil warriors from Nebaj and nearby settlements. A lengthy battle followed during which the Spanish cavalry managed to outflank the Ixil army and forced them to retreat to their mountaintop fortress at Nebaj. The Spanish force besieged the city, and their indigenous allies managed to scale the walls, penetrate the stronghold and set it on fire. Many defending Ixil warriors withdrew to fight the fire, which allowed the Spanish to storm the entrance and break the defences. The victorious Spanish rounded up the surviving defenders and the next day Castellanos ordered them all to be branded as slaves as punishment for their resistance. The inhabitants of Chajul immediately capitulated to the Spanish as soon as news of the battle reached them. The Spanish continued east towards Uspantán to find it defended by 10,000 warriors, including forces from Cotzal, Cunén, Sacapulas and Verapaz. The Spaniards were barely able to organise a defence before the defending army attacked. Although heavily outnumbered, the deployment of Spanish cavalry and the firearms of the Spanish infantry eventually decided the battle. The Spanish overran Uspantán and again branded all surviving warriors as slaves. The surrounding towns also surrendered, and December 1530 marked the end of the military stage of the conquest of the Cuchumatanes.

==== Reduction of the Chuj and Qʼanjobʼal ====
In 1529 the Chuj city of San Mateo Ixtatán (then known by the name of Ystapalapán) was given in encomienda to the conquistador Gonzalo de Ovalle, a companion of Pedro de Alvarado, together with Santa Eulalia and Jacaltenango. In 1549, the first reduction (reducción in Spanish) of San Mateo Ixtatán took place, overseen by Dominican missionaries, in the same year the Qʼanjobʼal reducción settlement of Santa Eulalia was founded. Further Qʼanjobʼal reducciones were in place at San Pedro Soloma, San Juan Ixcoy and San Miguel Acatán by 1560. Qʼanjobʼal resistance was largely passive, based on withdrawal to the inaccessible mountains and forests from the Spanish reducciones. In 1586 the Mercedarian Order built the first church in Santa Eulalia. The Chuj of San Mateo Ixtatán remained rebellious and resisted Spanish control for longer than their highland neighbours, resistance that was possible owing to their alliance with the lowland Lakandon Chʼol to the north. The continued resistance was so determined that the Chuj remained pacified only while the immediate effects of the Spanish expeditions lasted.

In the late 17th century, the Spanish missionary Fray Alonso de León reported that about eighty families in San Mateo Ixtatán did not pay tribute to the Spanish Crown or attend the Roman Catholic mass. He described the inhabitants as quarrelsome and complained that they had built a pagan shrine in the hills among the ruins of pre-Columbian temples, where they burnt incense and offerings and sacrificed turkeys. He reported that every March they built bonfires around wooden crosses about two leagues from the town and set them on fire. Fray de León informed the colonial authorities that the practices of the natives were such that they were Christian in name only. Eventually, Fray de León was chased out of San Mateo Ixtatán by the locals.

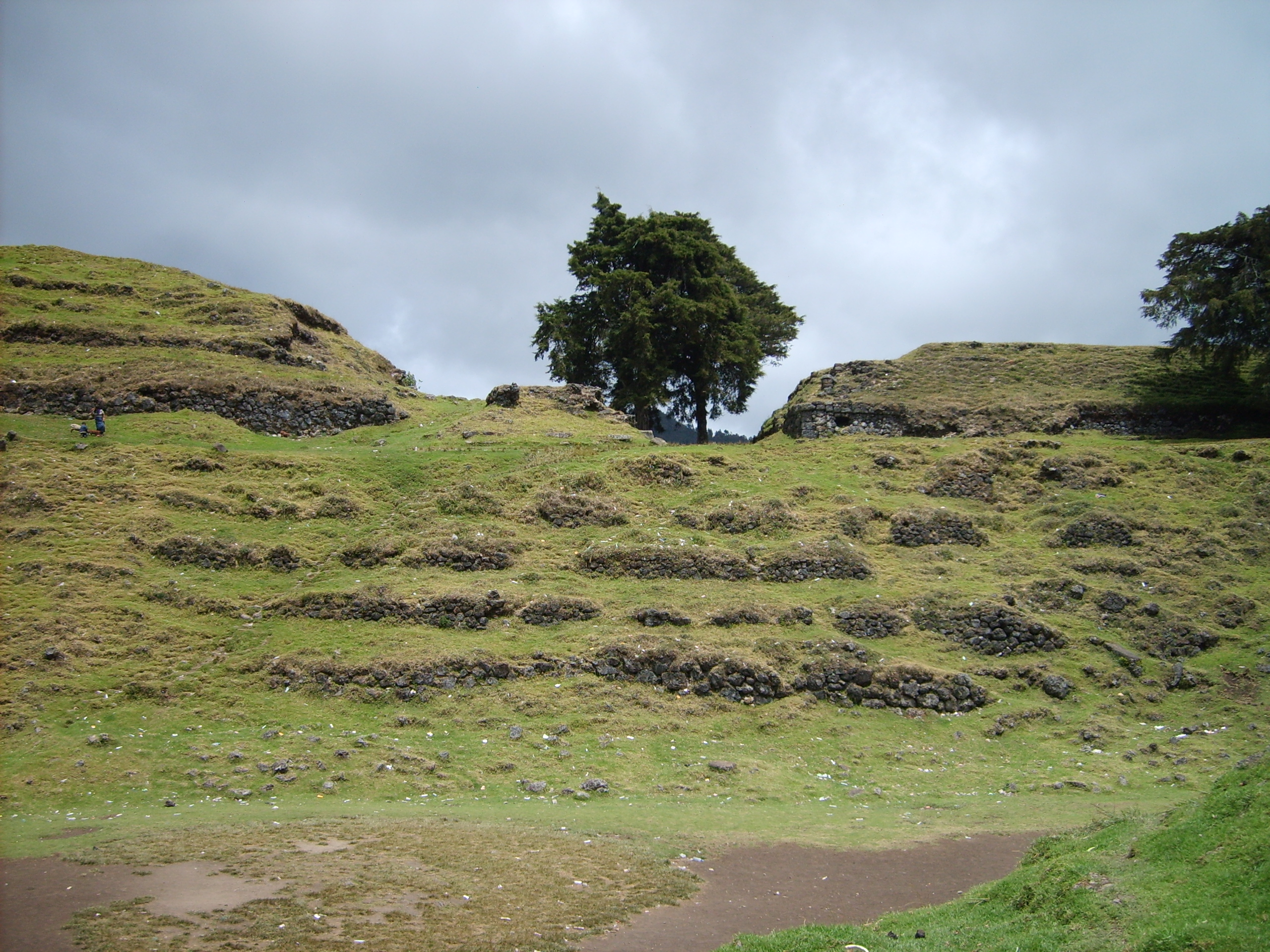
The ruins of Ystapalapán

In 1684, a council led by Enrique Enríquez de Guzmán, the governor of Guatemala, decided on the reduction of San Mateo Ixtatán and nearby Santa Eulalia, both within the colonial administrative district of the Corregimiento of Huehuetenango.

On 29 January 1686, Captain Melchor Rodríguez Mazariegos, acting under orders from the governor, left Huehuetenango for San Mateo Ixtatán, where he recruited indigenous warriors from the nearby villages, 61 from San Mateo itself. It was believed by the Spanish colonial authorities that the inhabitants of San Mateo Ixtatán were friendly towards the still unconquered and fiercely hostile inhabitants of the Lacandon region, which included parts of what is now the Mexican state of Chiapas and the western part of the Petén Basin. To prevent news of the Spanish advance reaching the inhabitants of the Lacandon area, the governor ordered the capture of three of San Mateo's community leaders, named as Cristóbal Domingo, Alonso Delgado and Gaspar Jorge, and had them sent under guard to be imprisoned in Huehuetenango. The governor himself arrived in San Mateo Ixtatán on 3 February, where Captain Rodríguez Mazariegos was already awaiting him. The governor ordered the captain to remain in the village and use it as a base of operations for penetrating the Lacandon region. The Spanish missionaries Fray de Rivas and Fray Pedro de la Concepción also remained in the town. Governor Enriquez de Guzmán subsequently left San Mateo Ixtatán for Comitán in Chiapas, to enter the Lacandon region via Ocosingo.

In 1695, a three-way invasion of the Lacandon was launched simultaneously from San Mateo Ixtatán, Cobán and Ocosingo. Captain Rodriguez Mazariegos, accompanied by Fray de Rivas and 6 other missionaries together with 50 Spanish soldiers, left Huehuetenango for San Mateo Ixtatán. Following the same route used in 1686, they managed on the way to recruit 200 indigenous Maya warriors from Santa Eulalia, San Juan Solomá and San Mateo itself. On 28 February 1695, all three groups left their respective bases of operations to conquer the Lacandon. The San Mateo group headed northeast into the Lacandon Jungle.

== Pacific lowlands: Pipil and Xinca ==
Before the arrival of the Spanish, the western portion of the Pacific plain was dominated by the Kʼicheʼ and Kaqchikel states, while the eastern portion was occupied by the Pipil and the Xinca. The Pipil inhabited the area of the modern department of Escuintla and a part of Jutiapa; the main Xinca territory lay to the east of the main Pipil population in what is now Santa Rosa department; there were also Xinca in Jutiapa.

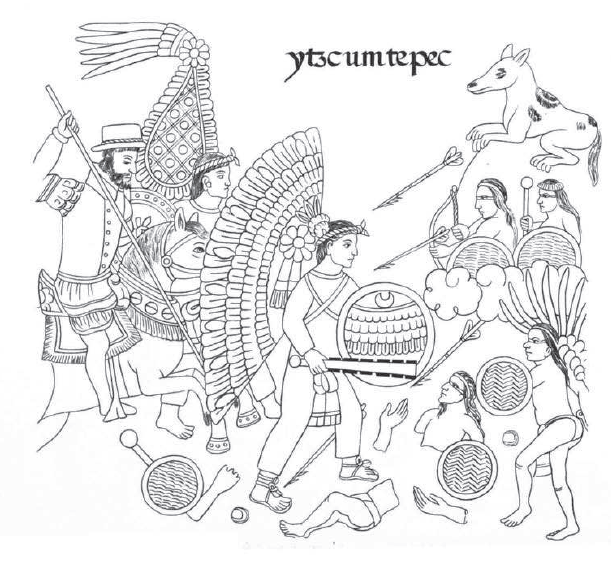
Page from the Lienzo de Tlaxcala depicting the conquest of Izcuintepeque

In the half century preceding the arrival of the Spanish, the Kaqchikel were frequently at war with the Pipil of Izcuintepeque (modern Escuintla). By March 1524 the Kʼiche had been defeated, followed by a Spanish alliance with the Kaqchikel in April of the same year. On 8 May 1524, soon after his arrival in Iximche and immediately following his subsequent conquest of the Tzʼutujil around Lake Atitlán, Pedro de Alvarado continued southwards to the Pacific coastal plain with an army numbering approximately 6,000, (Note: Most of these were native allies.) where he defeated the Pipil of Panacal or Panacaltepeque (called Panatacat in the Annals of the Kaqchikels) near Izcuintepeque on 9 May. Alvarado described the terrain approaching the town as very difficult, covered with dense vegetation and swampland that made the use of cavalry impossible; instead he sent men with crossbows ahead. The Pipil withdrew their scouts because of the heavy rain, believing that the Spanish and their allies would not be able to reach the town that day. However, Pedro de Alvarado pressed ahead and when the Spanish entered the town the defenders were completely unprepared, with the Pipil warriors indoors sheltering from the torrential rain. In the battle that ensued, the Spanish and their indigenous allies suffered minor losses but the Pipil were able to flee into the forest, sheltered from Spanish pursuit by the weather and the vegetation. Pedro de Alvarado ordered the town to be burnt and sent messengers to the Pipil lords demanding their surrender, otherwise he would lay waste to their lands. According to Alvarado's letter to Cortés, the Pipil came back to the town and submitted to him, accepting the king of Spain as their overlord. The Spanish force camped in the captured town for eight days. A few years later, in 1529, Pedro de Alvarado was accused of using excessive brutality in his conquest of Izcuintepeque, amongst other atrocities.

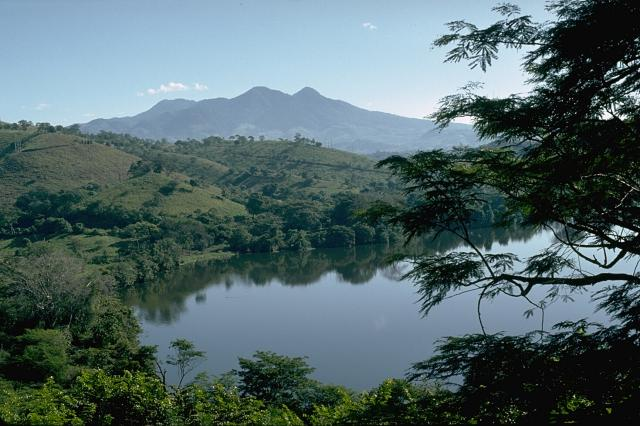
The Pacific slope of Jutiapa was the scene of a number of battles with the Xinca.

In Guazacapán, now a municipality in Santa Rosa, Pedro de Alvarado described his encounter with people who were neither Maya nor Pipil, speaking a different language altogether; these people were probably Xinca. At this point Alvarado's force consisted of 250 Spanish infantry accompanied by 6,000 indigenous allies, mostly Kaqchikel and Cholutec. Alvarado and his army defeated and occupied the most important Xinca city, named as Atiquipaque, usually considered to be in the Taxisco area. The defending warriors were described by Alvarado as engaging in fierce hand-to-hand combat using spears, stakes and poisoned arrows. The battle took place on 26 May 1524 and resulted in a significant reduction of the Xinca population. Alvarado's army continued eastwards from Atiquipaque, seizing several more Xinca cities. Tacuilula feigned a peaceful reception only to unsuccessfully raise arms against the conquistadors within an hour of their arrival. Taxisco and Nancintla fell soon afterwards. Because Alvarado and his allies could not understand the Xinca language, Alvarado took extra precautions on the march eastward by strengthening his vanguard and rearguard with ten cavalry apiece. In spite of these precautions the baggage train was ambushed by a Xinca army soon after leaving Taxisco. Many indigenous allies were killed and most of the baggage was lost, including all the crossbows and ironwork for the horses. This was a serious setback and Alvarado camped his army in Nancintla for eight days, during which time he sent two expeditions against the attacking army. Jorge de Alvarado led the first attempt with thirty to forty cavalry and although they routed the enemy they were unable to retrieve any of the lost baggage, much of which had been destroyed by the Xinca for use as trophies. Pedro de Portocarrero led the second attempt with a large infantry detachment but was unable to engage with the enemy due to the difficult Kʼicheʼ kingdom of Qʼumarkaj terrain, so returned to Nancintla. Alvarado sent out Xinca messengers to make contact with the enemy but they failed to return. Messengers from the city of Pazaco, in the modern department of Jutiapa, offered peace to the conquistadors but when Alvarado arrived there the next day the inhabitants were preparing for war. Alvarado's troops encountered a sizeable quantity of gathered warriors and quickly routed them through the city's streets. From Pazaco Alvarado crossed the Río Paz and entered what is now El Salvador.

After the conquest of the Pacific plain, the inhabitants paid tribute to the Spanish in the form of valuable products such as cacao, cotton, salt and vanilla, with an emphasis on cacao.

== Northern lowlands ==
The Contact Period in Guatemala's northern Petén lowlands lasted from 1525 through to 1700. Superior Spanish weaponry and the use of cavalry, although decisive in the northern Yucatán, were ill-suited to warfare in the dense forests of lowland Guatemala.

=== Cortés in Petén ===
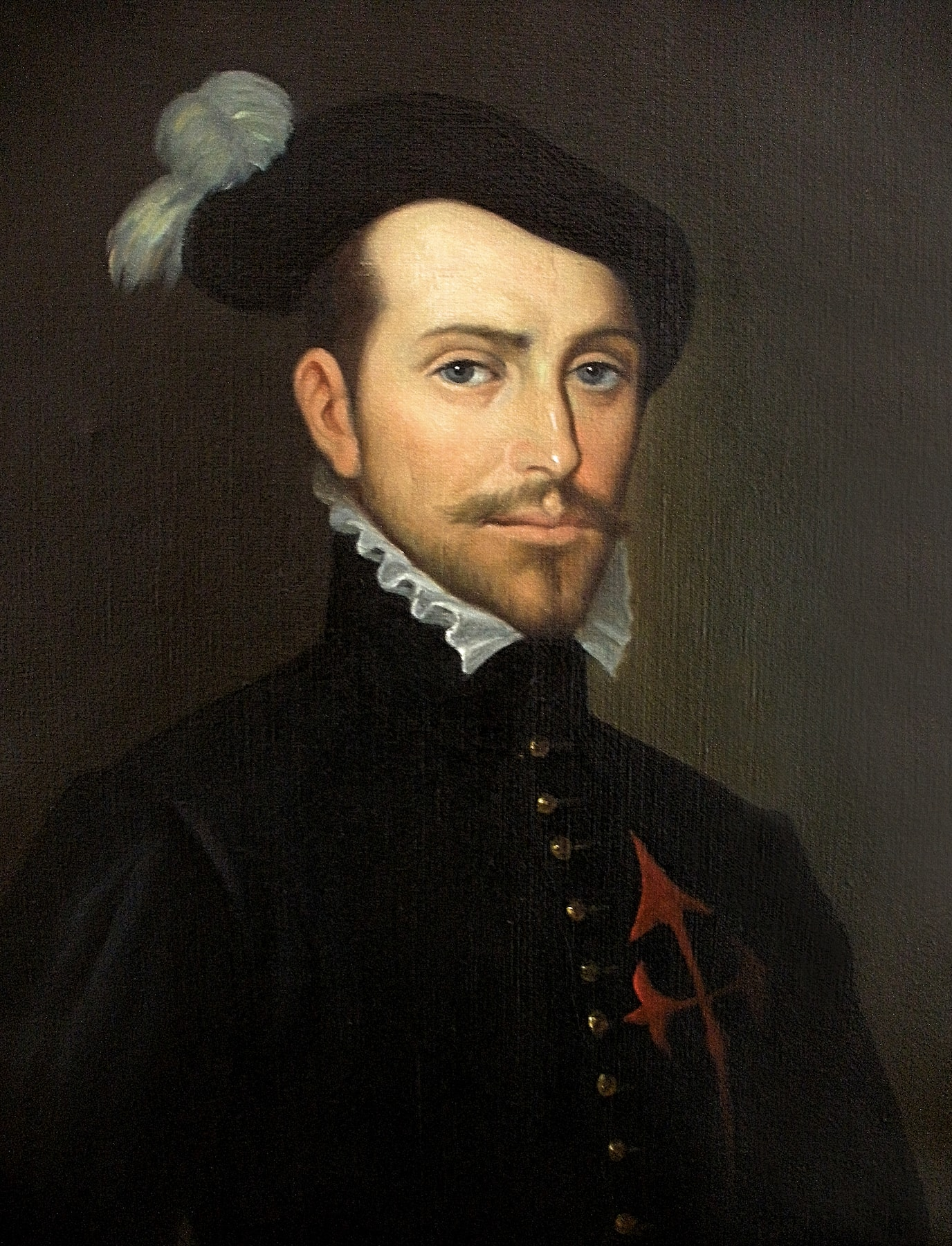
Hernán Cortés, conqueror of the Aztecs, travelled across Petén in the early 16th century.

In 1525, after the Spanish conquest of the Aztec Empire, Hernán Cortés led an expedition to Honduras over land, cutting across the Itza kingdom in what is now the northern Petén Department of Guatemala. His aim was to subdue the rebellious Cristóbal de Olid, whom he had sent to conquer Honduras, but Cristóbal de Olid had set himself up independently on his arrival in that territory. Cortés had 140 Spanish soldiers, 93 of them mounted, 3,000 Mexican warriors, 150 horses, a herd of pigs, artillery, munitions and other supplies. He also had with him 600 Chontal Maya carriers from Acalan. They arrived at the north shore of Lake Petén Itzá on 13 March 1525.

Cortés accepted an invitation from Aj Kan Ekʼ, the king of the Itza, to visit Nojpetén (also known as Tayasal), and crossed to the Maya city with 20 Spanish soldiers while the rest of his army continued around the lake to meet him on the south shore. On his departure from Nojpetén, Cortés left behind a cross and a lame horse. The Spanish did not officially contact the Itza again until the arrival of Franciscan priests in 1618, when Cortés' cross was said to still be standing at Nojpetén. From the lake, Cortés continued south along the western slopes of the Maya Mountains, a particularly arduous journey that took 12 days to cover 32 kilometres (20 mi), during which he lost more than two-thirds of his horses. When he came to a river swollen with the constant torrential rains that had been falling during the expedition, Cortés turned upstream to the Gracias a Dios rapids, which took two days to cross and cost him more horses.

On 15 April 1525 the expedition arrived at the Maya village of Tenciz. With local guides they headed into the hills north of Lake Izabal, where their guides abandoned them to their fate. The expedition became lost in the hills and came close to starvation before they captured a Maya boy who led them out to safety. Cortés found a village on the shore of Lake Izabal, perhaps Xocolo. He crossed the Dulce River to the settlement of Nito, somewhere on the Amatique Bay, with about a dozen companions, and waited there for the rest of his army to regroup over the course of the next week. By this time the remnants of the expedition had been reduced to a few hundred; Cortés succeeded in contacting the Spaniards he was searching for, only to find that his trusty lieutenant de las Casas had already successfully deposed Olid and then beheaded him for treason. Cortés constructed an improvised brigantine and, accompanied by canoes, he ascended the Dulce River to Lake Izabal, with about 40 Spaniards, and a number of Indians. He at first believed he had reached the Pacific, but soon realised his error. At the western end of the lake, he marched inland and engaged in battle with the Maya natives at the city of Chacujal, on the Polochic River. He seized plentiful supplies of food from the city and sent supplies back to Nito in the brigantine. He had rafts built to ferry supplies back downriver, and returned to Nito with them, while most of his men marched back overland. Cortés then returned to Mexico by sea.

=== Land of War: Verapaz ===
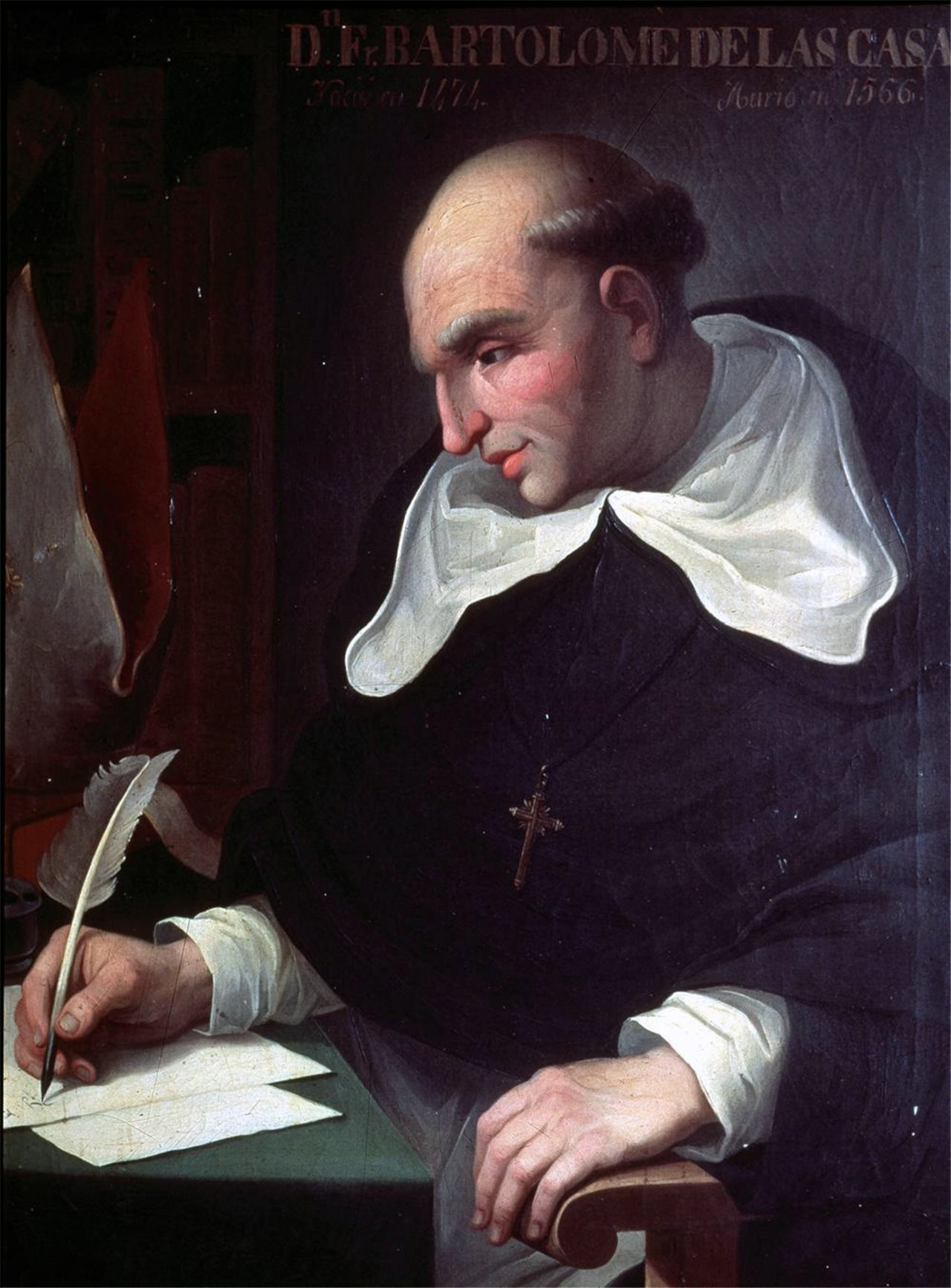
Dominican friar Bartolomé de las Casas promoted the peaceful conversion of the native peoples.

By 1537 the area immediately north of the new colony of Guatemala was being referred to as the Tierra de Guerra ("Land of War"). (Note: The colony of Guatemala at this time consisted only of the highlands and Pacific plain. Lovell et al. 1984, p. 460.) Paradoxically, it was simultaneously known as Verapaz ("True Peace"). The Land of War described an area that was undergoing conquest; it was a region of dense forest that was difficult for the Spanish to penetrate militarily. Whenever the Spanish located a centre of population in this region, the inhabitants were moved and concentrated in a new colonial settlement near the edge of the jungle where the Spanish could more easily control them. This strategy resulted in the gradual depopulation of the forest, simultaneously converting it into a wilderness refuge for those fleeing Spanish domination, both for individual refugees and for entire communities, especially those congregaciones that were remote from centres of colonial authority. The Land of War, from the 16th century through to the start of the 18th century, included a vast area from Sacapulas in the west to Nito on the Caribbean coast and extended northwards from Rabinal and Salamá, and was an intermediate area between the highlands and the northern lowlands. It includes the modern departments of Baja Verapaz and Alta Verapaz, Izabal and Petén, as well as the eastern part of El Quiché and a part of the Mexican state of Chiapas. The western portion of this area was the territory of the Qʼeqchiʼ Maya.

Pedro Orozco, (Note: His baptismal name.) the leader of the Sacatepéquez Mam of San Marcos department, lent willing help to the Dominicans in their campaign to peacefully subject the inhabitants of Verapaz. On 1 May 1543 Carlos V rewarded the Sacatepéquez Mam by issuing a royal order promising never to give them in encomienda.

Dominican friar Bartolomé de las Casas arrived in the colony of Guatemala in 1537 and immediately campaigned to replace violent military conquest with peaceful missionary work. Las Casas offered to achieve the conquest of the Land of War through the preaching of the Catholic faith. It was the Dominicans who promoted the use of the name Verapaz instead of the Land of War. Because it had not been possible to conquer the land by military means, the governor of Guatemala, Alonso de Maldonado, agreed to sign a contract promising he would not establish any new encomiendas in the area should Las Casas' strategy succeed. Las Casas and a group of Dominican friars established themselves in Rabinal, Sacapulas and Cobán, and managed to convert several native chiefs using a strategy of teaching Christian songs to merchant Indian Christians who then ventured into the area.

one could make a whole book ... out of the atrocities, barbarities, murders, clearances, ravages and other foul injustices perpetrated ... by those that went to Guatemala

— Bartolomé de las Casas

In this way they congregated a group of Christian Indians in the location of what is now the town of Rabinal. Las Casas became instrumental in the introduction of the New Laws in 1542, established by the Spanish Crown to control the excesses of the conquistadors and colonists against the indigenous inhabitants of the Americas. As a result, the Dominicans met substantial resistance from the Spanish colonists, who saw their own interests threatened by the New Laws; this distracted the Dominicans from their efforts to establish peaceful control over the Land of War.

In 1543 the new colonial reducción of Santo Domingo de Cobán was founded at Chi Monʼa to house the relocated Qʼeqchiʼ from Chichen, Xucaneb and Al Run Tax Aj. Santo Tomás Apóstol was founded nearby the same year at Chi Nim Xol, it was used in 1560 as a reducción to resettle Chʼol communities from Topiltepeque and Lacandon in the Usumacinta Valley. In 1555 the Acala Chʼol and their Lacandon allies killed the Spanish friar Domingo de Vico. De Vico had established a small church among the inhabitants of San Marcos, a region that lay between the territories of the Lacandon and the Manche Chʼol (an area unrelated to the department of San Marcos). De Vico had offended the local ruler by repeatedly scolding him for taking several wives. The indigenous leader shot the friar through the throat with an arrow; the angry natives then seized him, cut open his chest and extracted his heart. His corpse was then decapitated; the natives carried off his head, which was never recovered by the Spanish. In response a punitive expedition was launched, headed by Juan Matalbatz, a Qʼeqchiʼ leader from Chamelco; the independent Indians captured by the Qʼeqchiʼ expedition were taken back to Cobán and resettled in Santo Tomás Apóstol.

=== Lake Izabal and the lower Motagua River ===
Gil González Dávila set out from the Caribbean island of Hispaniola early in 1524, with the intention of exploring the Caribbean coast of Nicaragua. His course took him to the north coast of Honduras. After founding Puerto de Caballos, Gil Gónzalez sailed west along the coast to the Amatique Bay, and founded a Spanish settlement somewhere near the Dulce River, within modern-day Guatemala, which he named San Gil de Buena Vista. He launched a campaign of conquest in the mountainous region dividing Honduras from Guatemala. González left some of his men under the command of Francisco Riquelme at San Gil de Buena Vista, and sailed back east along the coast to Honduras. The colonists at San Gil did not prosper, and soon set out in search of a more hospitable location. They resettled in the important indigenous town of Nito, near the mouth of the Dulce River. Although they were in a desperate state, and near-starving, they were still there when Hernan Cortés passed through en route to Honduras, and were absorbed into his expedition.

The Dominicans established themselves in Xocolo on the shore of Lake Izabal in the mid-16th century. Xocolo became infamous among the Dominican missionaries for the practice of witchcraft by its inhabitants. By 1574 it was the most important staging post for European expeditions into the interior, and it remained important in that role until as late as 1630, although it was abandoned in 1631.

In 1598 Alfonso Criado de Castilla became governor of the Captaincy General of Guatemala. Owing to the poor state of Puerto de Caballos on the Honduran coast and its exposure to repeated pirate raids he sent a pilot to scout Lake Izabal. As a result of the survey, and after royal permission was granted, Criado de Castilla ordered the construction of a new port, named Santo Tomás de Castilla, at a favourable spot on the Amatique Bay not far from the lake. Work then began on building a highway from the port to the new capital of the colony, modern Antigua Guatemala, following the Motagua Valley into the highlands. Indigenous guides scouting the route from the highlands would not proceed further downriver than three leagues below Quiriguá, because the area was inhabited by the hostile Toquegua.

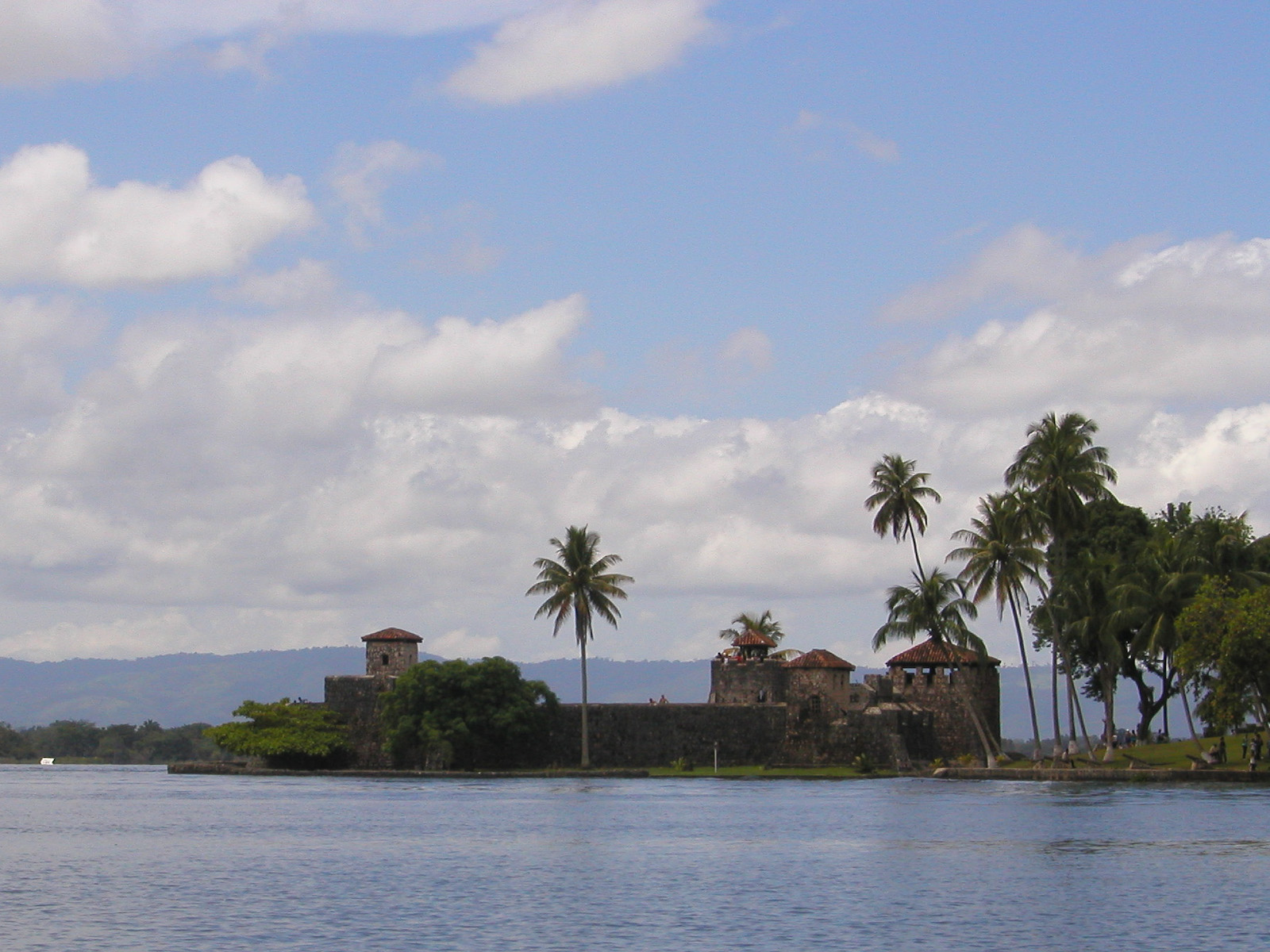
The Castillo de San Felipe was a Spanish fort that guarded the entrance to Lake Izabal.

The leaders of Xocolo and Amatique, backed by the threat of Spanish action, persuaded a community of 190 Toquegua to settle on the Amatique coast in April 1604. The new settlement immediately suffered a drop in population, but although the Amatique Toquegua were reported extinct before 1613 in some sources, Mercedarian friars were still attending to them in 1625. In 1628 the towns of the Manche Chʼol were placed under the administration of the governor of Verapaz, with Francisco Morán as their ecclesiastical head. Morán favoured a more robust approach to the conversion of the Manche and moved Spanish soldiers into the region to protect against raids from the Itza to the north. The new Spanish garrison in an area that had not previously seen a heavy Spanish military presence provoked the Manche to revolt, which was followed by abandonment of the indigenous settlements. By 1699 the neighbouring Toquegua no longer existed as a separate people because of a combination of high mortality and intermarriage with the Amatique Indians. At around this time the Spanish decided on the reduction of the independent (or "wild" from the Spanish point of view) Mopan Maya living to the north of Lake Izabal. The north shore of the lake, although fertile, was by then largely depopulated, therefore the Spanish planned to bring the Mopan out of the forests to the north into an area where they could be more easily controlled.

During the campaign to conquer the Itza of Petén, the Spanish sent expeditions to harass and relocate the Mopan north of Lake Izabal and the Chʼol Maya of the Amatique forests to the east. They were resettled in the Colonial reducción of San Antonio de las Bodegas on the south shore of the lake and in San Pedro de Amatique. By the latter half of the 18th century, the indigenous population of these towns had disappeared; the local inhabitants now consisted entirely of Spaniards, mulattos and others of mixed race, all associated with the Castillo de San Felipe de Lara fort guarding the entrance to Lake Izabal. The main cause of the drastic depopulation of Lake Izabal and the Motagua Delta was the constant slave raids by the Miskito Sambu of the Caribbean coast that effectively ended the Maya population of the region; the captured Maya were sold into slavery, a practise which was widespread among the Miskito.

=== Conquest of Petén ===
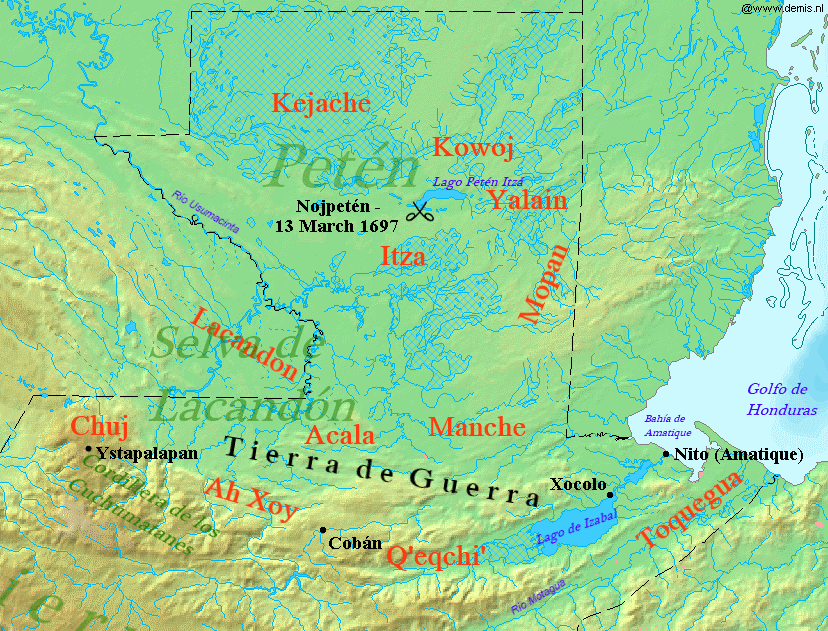
Map of the northern Guatemalan lowlands at the time of Spanish contact

From 1527 onwards the Spanish were increasingly active in the Yucatán Peninsula, establishing a number of colonies and towns by 1544, Xocolo Campeche and Valladolid in what is now Mexico. The Spanish impact on the northern Maya, encompassing invasion, epidemic diseases and the export of up to 50,000 Maya slaves, caused many Maya to flee southwards to join the Itza around Lake Petén Itzá, within the modern borders of Guatemala. The Spanish were aware that the Itza Maya had become the centre of anti-Spanish resistance and engaged in a policy of encircling their kingdom and cutting their trade routes over the course of almost two hundred years. The Itza resisted this steady encroachment by recruiting their neighbours as allies against the slow Spanish advance.

Dominican missionaries were active in Verapaz and the southern Petén from the late 16th century through the 17th century, attempting non-violent conversion with limited success. In the 17th century the Franciscans came to the conclusion that the pacification and Christian conversion of the Maya would not be possible as long as the Itza held out at Lake Petén Itzá. The constant flow of escapees fleeing the Spanish-held territories to find refuge with the Itza was a drain on the encomiendas. Fray Bartolomé de Fuensalida visited Nojpetén in 1618 and 1619. The Franciscan missionaries attempted to use their own reinterpretation of the kʼatun prophecies when they visited Nojpetén at this time, to convince the current Aj Kan Ekʼ and his Maya priesthood that the time for conversion had come. But the Itza priesthood interpreted the prophecies differently, and the missionaries were fortunate to escape with their lives. In 1695 the colonial authorities decided to connect the province of Guatemala with Yucatán, and Guatemalan soldiers conquered a number of Chʼol communities, the most important being Sakbʼajlan on the Lacantún River in eastern Chiapas, now in Mexico, which was renamed as Nuestra Señora de Dolores, or Dolores del Lakandon. The Franciscan friar Andrés de Avendaño oversaw a second attempt to overcome the Itza in 1695, convincing the Itza king that the Kʼatun 8 Ajaw, a twenty-year Maya calendrical cycle beginning in 1696 or 1697, was the right time for the Itza to finally embrace Christianity and to accept the king of Spain as overlord. However the Itza had local Maya enemies who resisted this conversion, and in 1696 Avendaño was fortunate to escape with his life. The Itza's continued resistance had become a major embarrassment for the Spanish colonial authorities, and soldiers were despatched from Campeche to take Nojpetén once and for all.

==== Fall of Nojpetén ====
Martín de Ursúa y Arizmendi arrived on the western shore of Lake Petén Itzá with his soldiers on 26 February 1697 and, once there, built a galeota, a large and heavily armed oar-powered attack boat. The Itza capital fell in a bloody waterborne assault on 13 March 1697. The Spanish bombardment caused heavy loss of life on the island; many Itza Maya who fled to swim across the lake were killed in the water. After the battle the surviving defenders melted away into the forests, leaving the Spanish to occupy an abandoned Maya town. The Itza and Kowoj kings (Ajaw Kan Ekʼ and Aj Kowoj) were soon captured, together with other Maya nobles and their families. With Nojpetén safely in the hands of the Spanish, Ursúa returned to Campeche; he left a small garrison on the island, isolated amongst the hostile Itza and Kowoj who still dominated the mainland. Nojpetén was renamed by the Spanish as Nuestra Señora de los Remedios y San Pablo, Laguna del Itza ("Our Lady of Remedy and Saint Paul, Lake of the Itza"). The garrison was reinforced in 1699 by a military expedition from Guatemala, accompanied by mixed-race ladino civilians who came to found their own town around the military camp. The settlers brought disease with them, which killed many soldiers and colonists and swept through the indigenous population. The Guatemalans stayed just three months before returning to Santiago de los Caballeros de Guatemala, taking the captive Itza king with them, together with his son and two of his cousins. The cousins died on the long journey to the colonial capital; Ajaw Kan Ekʼ and his son spent the rest of their lives under house arrest in the capital.

=== Final years of conquest ===
In the late 17th century the small population of Chʼol Maya in southern Petén and Belize was forcibly removed to Alta Verapaz, where the people were absorbed into the Qʼeqchiʼ population. The Chʼol of the Lacandon Jungle were resettled in Huehuetenango in the early 18th century. Catholic priests from Yucatán founded several mission towns around Lake Petén Itzá in 1702–1703. Surviving Itza and Kowoj were resettled in the new colonial towns by a mixture of persuasion and force. Kowoj and Itza leaders in these mission towns rebelled against their Spanish overlords in 1704, but although well-planned, the rebellion was quickly crushed. Its leaders were executed and most of the mission towns were abandoned. By 1708 only about 6,000 Maya remained in central Petén, compared to ten times that number in 1697. Although disease was responsible for the majority of deaths, Spanish expeditions and internecine warfare between indigenous groups also played their part.

== Legacy of the Spanish conquest ==
The initial shock of the Spanish conquest was followed by decades of heavy exploitation of the indigenous peoples, allies and foes alike. Over the following two hundred years colonial rule gradually imposed Spanish cultural standards on the subjugated peoples. The Spanish reducciones created new nucleated settlements laid out in a grid pattern in the Spanish style, with a central plaza, a church and the town hall housing the civil government, known as the ayuntamiento. This style of settlement can still be seen in the villages and towns of the area. The civil government was either run directly by the Spanish and their descendants (the criollos) or was tightly controlled by them. The introduction of Catholicism was the main vehicle for cultural change, and resulted in religious syncretism. Old World cultural elements came to be thoroughly adopted by Maya groups, an example being the marimba, a musical instrument of African origin. The greatest change was the sweeping aside of the pre-Columbian economic order and its replacement by European technology and livestock; this included the introduction of iron and steel tools to replace Neolithic tools, and of cattle, pigs and chickens that largely replaced the consumption of game. New crops were also introduced; however, sugarcane and coffee led to plantations that economically exploited native labour. Sixty per cent of the modern population of Guatemala is estimated to be Maya, concentrated in the central and western highlands. The eastern portion of the country was the object of intense Spanish migration and hispanicization. Guatemalan society is divided into a class system largely based on race, with Maya peasants and artisans at the bottom, the mixed-race ladino salaried workers and bureaucrats forming the middle and lower class and above them the creole elite of pure European ancestry. Some indigenous elites such as the Xajil did manage to maintain a level of status into the colonial period; a prominent Kaqchikel noble family, they chronicled the history of their region.
