= San Juan Ixcoy =

San Juan Ixcoy Yich Kʼox
- Municipality
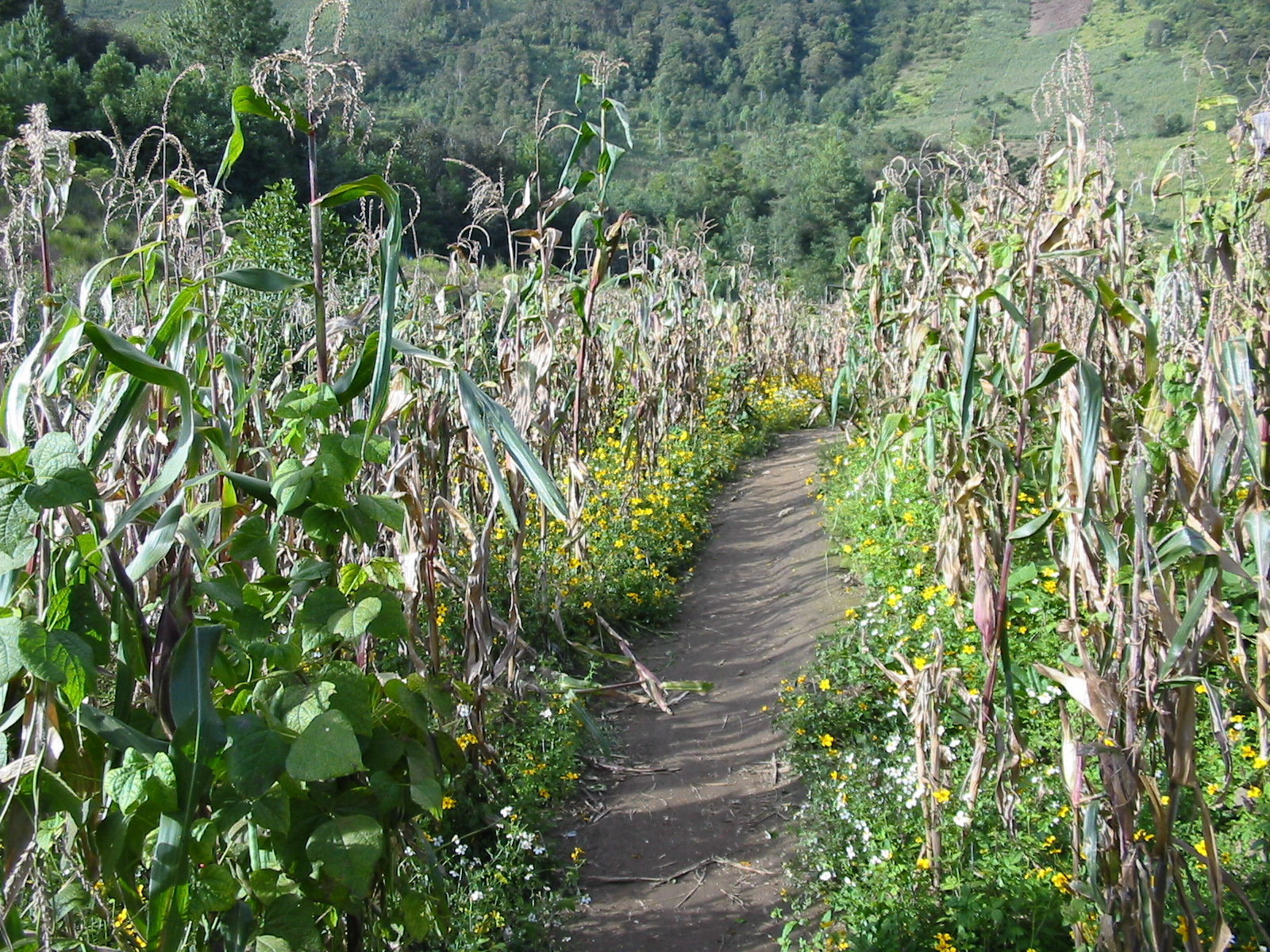
- Milpa fields in the Guatemalan highlands with maize, beans and squash

- Location in Guatemala
- Coordinates: 15°36′0″N 91°27′0″W
- Country: Guatemala
- Department: Huehuetenango
- Municipality: San Juan Ixcoy

Government
  - Type: Municipal

Area
  - Municipality: 224 km^{2} (86 sq mi)
- Highest elevation: 2,000 m (6,600 ft)
- Lowest elevation: 1,500 m (4,900 ft)

Population (Census 2002)
  - Municipality: 19,367
  - Urban: 2,185
  - Ethnicities: Q'anjob'al (90%) Mam (7%) Akatek (2%) Ladino (1%)
  - Religions: Roman Catholicism Evangelicalism Maya
- Climate: Cwb
- Website: Municipal site

San Juan Ixcoy (also known as Yich Kʼox in Qʼanjobʼal) is a municipality in the Guatemalan department of Huehuetenango. The municipality covers an area of 224 km^{2} (86 sq mi) and is formed by the town of San Juan Ixcoy, 11 villages and 33 caserios (rural communities). Its population of 19,367 (in 2002) is predominantly of Maya Q'anjob'al descent.

San Juan Ixcoy is located in the Sierra de los Cuchumatanes range and borders with the municipalities of Soloma and Santa Eulalia in the North, Chiantla in the South and Nebaj in the East. By road, San Juan Ixcoy is directly served by RN-9-N. No rail transport exists nearby, and while there is an airport in Quetzaltenango, the closest international airport is La Aurora International Airport.

Most households depend on subsistence agricultural and produce maize, beans and ayote (Cucurbita argyrosperma), as well as potatoes, wheat, and horticultural products. Artesanal production of textiles and traditional crafts adds to household income. Other economic activities include labour migration to the large plantations on the Guatemalan south coast and in some cases to the United States.
