= Q'anjob'al =

Q'anjob'al may refer to:

- the Q'anjob'al people
- the Q'anjob'al language
