= San Pedro Soloma =

San Pedro Soloma Tzu'luma
- Municipality
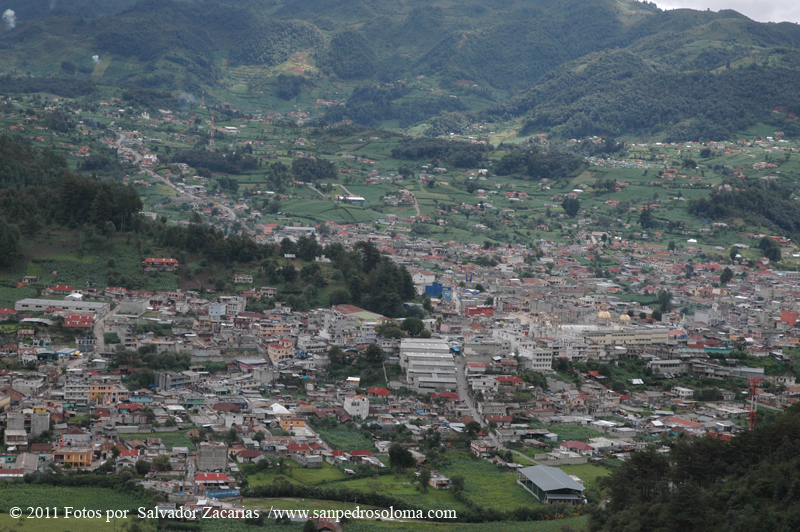
- San Pedro Soloma "El Valle del Ensueño"
- Nickname: El Valle del Ensueño
- Location in Guatemala
- Coordinates: 15°43′0″N 91°27′0″W
- Country: Guatemala
- Department: Huehuetenango
- Municipality: San Pedro Soloma
- Established: 2012

Government
  - Type: Municipal
  - Mayor: Joel Cardona 2024-2028

Area
  - Municipality: 264 km^{2} (102 sq mi)
  - Land: 266 km^{2} (103 sq mi)
- Elevation: 2,300 m (7,500 ft)
- Highest elevation: 3,500 m (11,500 ft)
- Lowest elevation: 1,900 m (6,200 ft)

Population (Census 2018)
  - Municipality: 49,030
  - Density: 184/km^{2} (477/sq mi)
  - Urban: 14,166
  - Ethnicities: Q'anjob'al Ladino
  - Religions: Roman Catholicism Evangelicalism Maya
- Time zone: UTC-6
- Climate: Cwb
- Website: Site

San Pedro Soloma (also known as Tzu'luma in Qʼanjobʼal) is a town and municipality of Huehuetenango, a department of Guatemala. It is located in the Sierra de los Cuchumatanes at 2,300 m above sea level. The municipality covers a total area of 264 km^{2} with elevations ranging from 1,900 m to 3,500 m. Its population of 49,030 is spread over the town of Soloma, 19 villages and 50 smaller rural communities (caserios).

The annual celebrations in honor of the town's patron Saint Peter take place from June 24 to 30. Its mayan name is Tzu'luma.

== History ==
=== Mercedarian doctrine ===
Mercedarian coat of arms.

After the Spanish conquest of Guatemala in the 1520s, the "Presentación de Guatemala" Mercedarian province was formed in 1565; originally, the order of the Blessed Virgin Mary of Mercy had gotten from bishop Francisco Marroquín several doctrines in the Sacatepéquez and Chimaltenango valleys, close to the capital Santiago de los Caballeros de Guatemala, but they traded those with the Order of Preachers friars in exchange for the doctrines those had in the Sierra de los Cuchumatanes area. During the first part of the 17th century they also had doctrine in four town close to the city of Santiago, which eventually became city neighborhoods: Espíritu Santo, Santiago, San Jerónimo and San Anton —which was the capital of the Mercedarians, where they had their convent and where their comendador lived.

According to bishop Juan de las Cabezas memoir in 1613 and the bishop Pedro Cortés y Larraz parish visit minutes from 1770, the Mercedarians came to have nine doctrines, and numerous annexes, which were: Santa Ana de Malacatán, Concepción de Huehuetenango, San Pedro de Solomá, Nuestra Señora de la Purificación de Jacaltenango, Nuestra Señora de la Candelaria de Chiantla, San Andrés de Cuilco, Santiago de Tejutla, San Pedro de Sacatepéquez, and San Juan de Ostuncalco.

However, in 1754, due to the borbon reforms implemented by the Spanish kings, the Mercedarins -and the rest of the regular clergy for that matter-, had to transfer their doctrines to the secular clergy, thus losing their Chiantla convent and annexed doctrines.

== See also ==
- List of places in Guatemala

== Notes and references ==
=== Bibliography ===
- Cortés y Larraz, Pedro (1770). Descripción Geográfico-Moral de la Diócesis de Goathemala (in Spanish). Guatemala: Diócesis de Guatemala.
- Juarros, Domingo (1818). Compendio de la historia de la Ciudad de Guatemala (in Spanish). Guatemala: Ignacio Beteta.
- Pérez, Pedro Nolasco O. de M. (1966). Historia de las Misiones Mercedarias en América (in Spanish). Madrid.
