= Qʼanjobʼal language =

Mayan language of Guatemala and Mexico

Qʼanjobʼal
- Kanjobal
- Pronunciation: [qʼanxoɓal]
- Native to: Guatemala
- Region: Huehuetenango, Guatemala, Chiapas
- Ethnicity: 208,000 Qʼanjobʼal in Guatemala (2019 census)
- Native speakers: 180,000: 170,000 in Guatemala (2015 – 2019 census); 10,000 in Mexico (2020 census)
- Language family: Mayan: Western Mayan; Qʼanjobalan; Qʼanjobalan; Kanjobal–Jacaltec; Qʼanjobʼal
- Writing system: Latin

Official status
- Official language in: Guatemala
- Regulated by: Instituto Nacional de Lenguas Indígenas

Language codes
- ISO 639-3: kjb
- Glottolog: qanj1241
- ELP: Q'anjob'al

Qʼanjobʼal (IPA: [qʼanxoɓal]) (also Kanjobal) is a Mayan language from the Q'anjobalan branch spoken primarily in Guatemala and part of Mexico. According to 1998 estimates compiled by SIL International in Ethnologue, there were approximately 77,700 native speakers, primarily in the Huehuetenango Department of Guatemala. In Chiapas, Mexico, municipalities where the Qʼanjobʼal language is spoken include Catazajá, Amatenango de la Frontera, La Trinitaria, Bella Vista, Frontera Comalapa, Las Margaritas and Maravilla Tenejapa. In Huehuetenango, the municipalities where the language is spoken are San Juan Ixcoy (Yich Kʼox), San Pedro Soloma (Tzʼulumaʼ ), Santa Eulalia (Jolom Konobʼ ), Santa Cruz Barillas (Yalmotx), San Rafael La Independencia, and San Miguel Acatán (Pedro Mateo Pedro 2010). Qʼanjobʼal is taught in public schools through Guatemala's intercultural bilingual education programs.

== Classification ==
Qʼanjobʼal is a member of the Qʼanjobʼalan branch of the Mayan language family. The Mayan language family includes 31 languages, two of which are now extinct. The Qʼanjobʼalan branch includes not only Qʼanjobʼal itself but also Chuj, Akatek, and Jakaltek, also spoken in Mexico and Guatemala. The Qʼanjobʼalan languages are noted for being among the most conservative of the Mayan language family, although they do include some interesting innovations.

== Phonology ==
Qʼanjobʼal consists of 26 consonant sounds and 5 vowel sounds.

Vowels
	Front	Back
Close	i	u
Mid	e	o
Open	a	

Consonants
		Bilabial	Alveolar		Post- alveolar	Retroflex	Velar	Uvular	Glottal
Nasal		⟨m⟩ m	⟨n⟩ n						
Plosive/ Affricate	plain	⟨p⟩ p	⟨t⟩ t	⟨tz⟩ ts	⟨ch⟩ tʃ	⟨tx⟩ ʈʂ	⟨k⟩ k	⟨q⟩ q	⟨ʼ⟩ ʔ
Plosive/ Affricate	ejective		⟨tʼ⟩ tʼ	⟨tzʼ⟩ tsʼ	⟨chʼ⟩ tʃʼ	⟨txʼ⟩ ʈʂʼ	⟨kʼ⟩ kʼ	⟨qʼ⟩ qʼ	
Plosive/ Affricate	implosive	⟨bʼ⟩ ɓ							
Fricative			⟨s⟩ s		⟨xh⟩ ʃ	⟨x⟩ ʂ	⟨j⟩ x		
Approximant		(⟨w⟩ v)	⟨l⟩ l		⟨y⟩ j		⟨w⟩ w		
Flap			⟨r⟩ ɾ						

- /r/ in Qʼanjobʼal has a limited distribution. It is used mostly in borrowings, primarily in words borrowed from Spanish, such as roxax, rose, from Spanish rosa. It is also used in affect and positional words like kʼarari 'noise of an old engine or the like', jeran 'to be in a broken position/form'.

=== Stress ===
Primary stress in Qʼanjobʼal is fairly simple. Words in isolation and in final phrase boundaries bear stress on the last syllable. However, words within a phrasal unit (not in final phrase boundary) bear stress on their first syllable.

== Morphology and syntax ==
=== Verbs ===
As in all Mayan languages, Qʼanjobʼal classifies all verbs as either inherently intransitive (calling up only one argument) or as inherently transitive (calling up two arguments). Qʼanjobʼal is an ergative–absolutive language, in which the subject of a transitive verb takes an ergative affix, while the subject of an intransitive verb, as well as the object of a transitive verb, takes an absolutive affix.

There are two sets of affixes for ergative: the first set is used for those verbal roots beginning with a consonant, and the second set is used for those beginning with a vowel.

Ergative prefixes
	verbal roots beginning with a consonant		verbal roots beginning with a vowel	
	Singular	Plural	Singular	Plural
1st person	hin-	ko-	w-	j-
2nd person	ha-	he-	h-	hey-
3rd person	s-/Ø-	s-/Ø-	y-	y-

X-Ø-inmaqʼ naq winaq.
COMP-A3S-E1S-hit CL:masc man
'I hit the man.' (Mateo 2008: p.c.)

Ergative affixes are also used for possession.

w-aqan
E1S-foot
'my foot'

s-qʼab
E3S-hand
'his/her hand'

There is only one set of absolutive affixes with two variations: pronounced like free words or attached to something else. The third person absolutive affix is Ø, i.e., unmarked or empty.

Absolutive affixes
	when attached to preceding sounds		not attached to a preceding sound	
	Singular	Plural	Singular	Plural
1st person	-in	-on	hin	hon
2nd person	-ach	-ex	hach	hex
3rd person	-Ø	-Ø...(hebʼ)	Ø	Ø...(hebʼ)

X-in way-i.
COMP-A1S sleep-STAT
'I slept.' (Mateo 2008: p.c.)

However, while verbs are classified as either ergative or absolutive and take their own respective sets of pronoun affixes, this rule is altered in certain cases, such as when a verb becomes progressive:

Ch-in kuy-w-i.
INC-A1S study-SFX-STAT
'I study'.

but,

Ipan hin-kuy-w-i.
PROG E1S-study-SFX-STAT
'I am studying'.

=== Aspect ===
In Qʼanjobʼal, aspect (whether an action has been completed or not) is more important than tense. Thus, in most utterances, one will indicate whether the action is incompletive, or whether it is completed, or may happen in the future, in which case it is considered 'unreal', or of irrealis mood, the event still only in the realm of thought or imagination.

==== Incompletive ====
Ch(i) is used to indicate that an event is incomplete or ongoing at some time:

Chi-Ø toj naq unin bʼay y-atut-al kuy-oj.
INC-A3S go CL:masc child to E3S-house-ABS study-NZR
'The boy goes to school'.

==== Completive ====
Max or x- (both forms are used in free variation) are used to indicate that an event is complete:

Max-ex mulnaj-i.
COM-A2P work-STAT
'You (pl.) worked.'

X-Ø way-i.
COM-A3S sleep-STAT
'He/she slept.'

==== Future/Irrealis ====
The prefix hoq- with the suffix -oq are used to indicate that the event spoken of has not yet happened, but remains only in the realm of the 'unreal' with only the potential for occurrence in the future:

Hoq-Ø saqch-oq heb'.
IRR-A3 play-IRR A3P
'They will play.'

==== Negative ====
Negative particles include kʼam and manaq:

Kʼam chi-Ø y-oche-j.
NEG INC-A3S E3S-want-SFX
'He/she doesn't want it.'

Manaq ix chi-Ø toj kuy-oj.
NEG she INC-A3S go study-NOM
'It is not she who goes to study.'

==== Interrogative ====
Questions can be formed simply by using rising intonation with declarative syntax:

Ch-Ø-oche-j cha-ch kanal-w-i w-etoq?
INC-A3S-E2S-SFX INC-A2S dance-SFX-STAT E1S-with
'Do you want to dance with me?'

There is also a question particle, mi:

Watxʼ mi ha-kul?
good INTER E2S-stomach
'Is your stomach good?'

(Used as common form of greeting, like English 'How are you?')

=== Affixation ===
Many different affixes are used in Qʼanjobʼal, both prefixes and suffixes. Among these are aj-, used to denote the doer or leader of an action: ajtzʼibʼ, ʼwriterʼ (< tzʼibʼ 'write'), ajbʼe, 'spiritual guide' (< bʼe 'road'); -bʼal, used to indicate the location where something happens: tzombʼal 'market' (< tzon 'buy'); -al, -alil, -il, used to derive abstract nouns from adjectives, adverbs, numerals, transitive verb roots, and nouns: syalixhal 'his/her smallness' (< yalixh 'small'); swinaqil 'husband' (< winaq 'man'); -kʼulal, to derive nouns from intransitive verbs, adjectives, other nouns, etc.: watxkʼulal 'friendliness'; -oj, nominalizer, turning verbs into nouns: kuyoj 'studying' (< kuy 'study').

=== Word order ===
Qʼanjobʼal has a fixed word order. It follows a verb–subject–object (VSO) word order. All changes to this word order are driven by pragmatic or syntactic factors like focus, negation, interrogation, relativization, etc. These are subject to an ergative–absolutive pattern where arguments cross-referenced by ergative affixes must become absolutives prior to their fronting (focus, negation, etc.). This results in some possible subject–verb (SV), object–verb–subject (OVS) orders. However SVO, SOV and OSV are not possible (or, at least, not attested in any known corpus). The apparent exception is in reflexives and reflexive possessives, where the reflexive phrase ERG-bʼa (noun) or reflexive possessive ERG-noun appears directly following the verb.

=== Classifiers ===
Some Qʼanjobʼal nouns require that certain classifiers be used with them. Among these are no' (animals), te (trees/wood), ix (female), naq (male), chʼen (stone/metal), xim (corn), and an (plants).

noʼ jun chej
CL:animal one horse
'the horse'

teʼ na
CL:wood house
'the house'

ix unin
CL:fem child
'the girl'

naq unin
CL:masc child
'the boy'

chʼen tumin
CL:metal money
'the money'

an kaq
CL:plant flower
'the flower'

=== Reduplication ===
Reduplication, or duplication of a root word, is a minor process in the formation of Qʼanjobʼal vocabulary, as in the following:

pux-pux
'belly of animal'

txʼa-txʼa
'chewing gum'

== Vocabulary ==
Qʼanjobʼal consists of groups of roots that can take affixes. Words are traditionally classified as nouns, adjectives, adverbs, intransitive and transitive verbs, particles, and positionals. Positionals are a group of roots which cannot function as words on their own; in combination with affixes they are used to describe relationships of position and location. Particles are words that do not take affixes; they mostly function in adverbial roles, and include such things as interrogative particles, affirmative/negative words, markers of time and location, conjunctions, prepositions and demonstratives.

Locatives are often formed by placing a noun after a possessed body-part term: s-ti bʼe, 'edge of the road' < 'its-mouth road' and s-jolom witz, 'mountaintop' or 'summit' < 'its-head mountain'. Similarly, compound nouns may be formed by placing a noun after another possessed noun: y-atutal kuyoj, 'school' < 'its-house studying'.

=== Numbers ===
- 1. jun
- 2. kabʼ
- 3. oxebʼ
- 4. kanebʼ
- 5. oyebʼ
- 6. waqebʼ
- 7. uqebʼ
- 8. waxaqebʼ
- 9. bʼalonebʼ
- 10. lajonebʼ
- 11. uslukʼebʼ
- 12. kabʼlajonebʼ
- 13. oxlajonebʼ
- 14. kanlajonebʼ
- 15. holajonebʼ
- 16. waqlajonebʼ
- 17. uqlajonebʼ
- 18. waxaqlajonebʼ
- 19. balonlajonebʼ
- 20. junkʼal
- 21. jun skakʼal
- 22. kabʼ skakʼal
- 23. oxebʼ skakʼal
- 24. kanebʼ skakʼal
- 25. oyeb skakʼal
- 26. waqebʼ skakʼal
- 27. uqebʼ skakʼal
- 28. waxaqebʼ skakʼal
- 29. bʼalonebʼ skakʼal
- 30. lajonebʼ skakʼal
- 31. uslukʼebʼ skakʼal
- 32. kabʼlajonebʼ skakʼal
- 33. oxlajunebʼ skakʼal
- 34. kanlajonebʼ skakʼal
- 35. holajonebʼ skakʼal
- 36. waqlajonebʼ skakʼal
- 37. uqlajonebʼ skakʼal
- 38. waxaqlajonebʼ skakʼal
- 39. balonlajunebʼ skakʼal
- 40. kakʼal
- 60. oxkʼal 3x20
- 80. kankʼal
- 100. okʼal
- 120. waqkʼal
- 140. uqkʼal
- 160. waxaqkʼal
- 180. balonlajonkʼal
- 200. lajunkʼal
- 400. junkʼalwinaq
- 800. kakʼalwinaq
- 2000. okʼalwinaq

=== Common words ===
anima	person
chʼenej	rock/stone
aʼ ej	water/river
ix	woman
chikay	grandmother
mamin	grandfather
ixim	corn
kaq	red/hot
kʼu	sun/day
mam	father
mis	cat
na	house (also atut)
patej	tortilla
sat kan	sky (lit. snake's eye)
son	marimba
te'	tree
txʼi'	dog
txʼotxʼej	land
txutx	mother
unin	child
waykan	star
winaq	man
witz	mountain
xajaw	moon/month
yibʼan qʼinal	Earth/world
xumak	flower
