= Qʼanjobʼal people =

Maya people in Guatemala

Qʼanjobʼal
- Qʼanjobʼal Mayas in Santa Eulalia

Total population
- 208,008

Regions with significant populations

Languages
- Qʼanjobʼal, Spanish

Religion
- Catholic, Evangelicalist, Maya religion

The Qʼanjobʼal (Kanjobal) are a Maya people that live in Huehuetenango Department, Guatemala. Their Indigenous language is also called Qʼanjobʼal. They are known for their resilience, as their culture significantly differs from that of other groups. A notable municipality to visit is San Pedro Soloma, which is prominent among the Q'anjob'al Mayans. Their marimba differs from the rest as it has an intense feeling.
