= Santa Eulalia, Huehuetenango =

Santa Eulalia
- Municipality
- Location in Guatemala Santa Eulalia (Huehuetenango Department)
- Coordinates: 15°44′0″N 91°27′31″W
- Country: Guatemala
- Department: Huehuetenango

Area
  - Total: 292 km^{2} (113 sq mi)

Population (2018)
  - Total: 51,910
  - Density: 178/km^{2} (460/sq mi)

Santa Eulalia (Spanish pronunciation: [ˈsanta ewˈlalia], also known as Jolom Konobʼ in Qʼanjobʼal) is a municipality located in the north-east of the department of Huehuetenango, Guatemala, Central America. This town is rich in culture and traditions. The majority of people here speak the Q'anjob'al language.

Santa Eulalia is situated in the Sierra de los Cuchumatanes at 2,300 metres (7,500 ft) above sea level. The annual celebrations in honor of the town's patron saint, Saint Eulalia takes place from 8 February and culminates in its main celebration day the 12th.
