= Languages of Guatemala =

- A language map of languages of Guatemala, according to the Comisión de Oficialización de los Dialectos Indígenas de Guatemala. Castilian is merely another name for Spanish.
- Official: Spanish
- Indigenous: Several languages
- Minority: Garifuna
- Foreign: English

Spanish is the official language of Guatemala, and is spoken by 93% of the population. Guatemalan Spanish is the local variant of the Spanish language.

Twenty-two Mayan languages are spoken, especially in rural areas, as well as two non-Mayan Amerindian languages: Xinca, an indigenous language, and Garifuna, an Arawakan language spoken on the Caribbean coast. According to the Language Law of 2003, the languages of Mayas, Xincas, and Garifunas are recognized as national languages.

German is spoken by more than 5,000 Germans citizens living permanently in Guatemala, as well as several thousand Guatemalans of German descent.

List of languages of Guatemala
Language	Family	Branch	Native speakers	% of total population	Notes
Spanish	Indo-European	Romance	9,481,907	69.9	Although 93% of Guatemalans can speak Spanish and it is the sole official language of the country, it is not spoken by the entire population, or even used as a second language. There are twenty-four distinct indigenous languages spoken in Guatemala.
Kʼicheʼ	Mayan	Kʼicheʼ	1,000,000	5.79	Language spoken in six departments: Sololá (in five municipalities), Totonicapán, Quetzaltenango, El Quiché, Suchitepéquez and Retalhuleu.
Q'eqchi'	Mayan	Kʼicheʼ	555,461	3.22	Spoken in Alta Verapaz, El Petén, Izabal and in El Quiché.
Kaqchikel	Mayan	Kʼicheʼ	500,000	2.9	Guatemala City, Chimaltenango, Escuintla, Suchitepéquez, Baja Verapaz and Sololá.
Mam	Mayan	Mam	480,000	2.78	Quetzaltenango, San Marcos, and Huehuetenango.
Poqomchiʼ	Mayan	Kʼicheʼ	92,000	0.53	Baja Verapaz and in Alta Verapaz.
Tz’utujil	Mayan	Kʼicheʼ	88,300	0.51	Sololá, Suchitepéquez.
Achí	Mayan	Kʼicheʼ	85,552	0.5	Spoken mainly in five municipalities of Baja Verapaz: Cubulco, Rabinal, San Miguel Chicaj, Salamá and San Jerónimo, and partially at El Chol and Granados, Baja Verapaz.
Q’anjob’al	Mayan	Q'anjob'al	77,700	0.45	Spoken in four municipalities of the Huehuetenango department: San Juan Ixcoy, San Pedro Soloma, Santa Eulalia, Santa Cruz Barillas.
Ixil	Mayan	Mam	70,000	0.41	Spoken in three municipalities of the El Quiché department, also known as the Ixil Triangle: Santa María Nebaj, San Gaspar Chajul, and San Juan Cotzal.
Akatek	Mayan	Q'anjob'al	48,500	0.28	Spoken in two municipalities in Huehuetenango: San Miguel Acatán y San Rafael La Independencia.
Jakaltek	Mayan	Q'anjob'al	40,000	0.23	Spoken in Jacaltenango and the surrounding Huista region in Huehuetenango.
Chuj	Mayan	Q'anjob'al	40,000	0.23	Spoken in San Mateo Ixtatán, San Sebastián Coatán and Nentón, all in the Huehuetenango Department.
Poqomam	Mayan	Kʼicheʼ	30,000	0.17	Spoken in Guatemala City, Jalapa, and Escuintla.
Ch'orti'	Mayan	Chol	30,000	0.17	Jocotán and Camotán, La Unión, Zacapa
Chalchitek	Mayan	Mam	21 550	0.10	Chalchitán, a neighborhood in Aguacatán, Huehuetenango.
Awakatek	Mayan	Mam	18,000	0.10	Primarily in Aguacatán, Huehuetenango.
Sakapultek	Mayan	Kʼicheʼ	9,763	0.06	Sacapulas in El Quiché.
Sipakapa	Mayan	Kʼicheʼ	8,000	0.06	Sipacapa, San Marcos.
Garífuna	Arawakan	Caribeña	5,860	0.03	Izabal. Garifuna is one of the languages brought to Guatemala by slaves Spanish colonists brought from other places.
Uspantek	Mayan	Kʼicheʼ	3,000	0.02	Uspantán and Chicamán, El Quiché.
Tektitek	Mayan	Mam	2,265	0.01	Tectitán and Cuilco, Huehuetenango.
Mopan	Mayan	Yucateca	2,000	0.01	San Luis, Poptún, Melchor de Mencos, and Dolores, El Petén .
Xincan languages	Xincan languages	at least four languages	16	0.0001	Spoken by about two hundred people in Santa Rosa and Jutiapa. An endangered language with unclear origins.The Xincan languages may have arrived from the South.
Itza	Mayan	Yucateca	12	0.0001	Spoken in six municipalities, mainly in San José, of the El Petén department.
