= Achi people =

Indigenous people of Guatemala

Achi
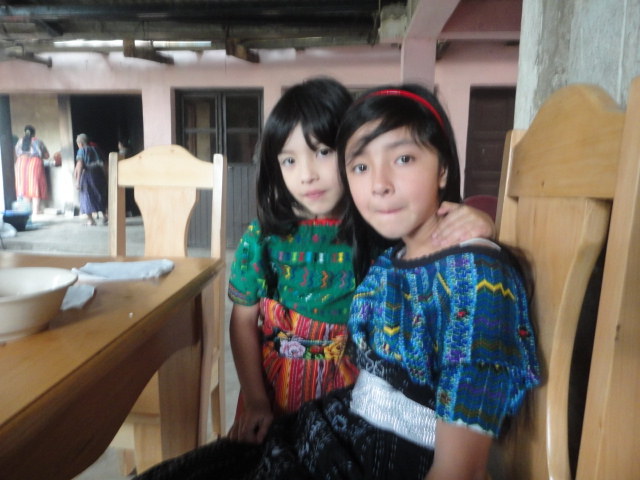
- Achi girls in Rabinal

Total population
- 160,858

Regions with significant populations
- Baja Verapaz, Guatemala

Languages
- Achi, Spanish

Religion
- Catholic, Evangelicalist, Maya religion

The Achi are a Maya ethnic group in Guatemala. They live in various municipalities in the department of Baja Verapaz. The municipalities they live in are Cubulco, Rabinal, San Miguel Chicaj, Salamá, San Jerónimo, and Purulhá, in addition to parts of Granados and el Chol.

They speak Achi, which is closely related to Kʼicheʼ.

== History ==
=== Pre-Columbian times ===
The Achi people originally lived near Tres Cruces, a place which they called Tzamaneb'. In the late 1300s, they conquered Baja Verapaz from Poqom speakers and founded their capital of Kajyub', possibly with the aid of the Kaqchikel people.

==== Attack by the Kʼicheʼ ====
The Kʼicheʼ cacique Quicab, (Note: There were several Kʼicheʼ kings named Quicab. It is assumed that the one in this story was the first.) famous for his wealth of pearls, emeralds, gold, and silver, approached the Achi at Xetulul. At noon, the Kʼicheʼ began to fight the Achi, winning lands and villages without killing any of them, only tormenting them. When the Achi surrendered, they gave tribute of fish and shrimp. As a present, the Achi offered cocoa and pataxte to the main cacique, Francisco Izquin Ahpalotz y Nehaib, giving him validity as king and obeying him as tributaries. The Achi gave him the rivers Zamalá, Ucuz, Nil, and Xab. These rivers were of great benefit to Cacique Quicab, as they produced fish, shrimp, turtles, and iguanas.

=== Spanish conquest ===
When Spanish Dominican friars arrived in present-day Guatemala, the only place they had yet to conquer was Tezulutlán, or "Tierra de Guerra" (Land of War). Bartolomé de las Casas was commissioned to "reduce" the indigenous people through Christianity.

One of the oldest references to Cubulco, a dialect of the Achi language, is found in el Título Real (The Royal Title) of Don Francisco Izquin Nehabib, written in 1558.

In 1862, the Kʼicheʼ-language play Rabinal Achí was published in Paris, France. This document was found by Abbé Charles Étienne Brasseur de Bourbourg. Expert studies state that the ethnodrama takes on values of military honor compared to Homer's Iliad.

The Dutch anthropologist Ruud Van Akkeren, in an interview on Mayan ethnic groups, stated that:

Los achíes del siglo XVI no eran los achíes de hoy; lo mismo pasa con los keqchíes o los quichés, sólo por mencionar algunos grupos. Estos pueblos tienen derecho a conocer su historia.
The Achi of the 16th century were not the Achi of today; the same goes for the Qʼeqchiʼ or the Kʼicheʼ, just to mention a few groups. These peoples have the right to know their history.

== Geography ==
The original name of Salamá, the capital of Baja Verapaz, is Tz'alam Ha', which means "tables on the water".

Salamá, Cubulco, Rabinal, San Miguel Chicaj and San Jerónimo are the only municipalities in Guatemala where the mother tongue is Achi.

In the municipality of Cubulco, there are less-visited archaeological sites such as Belejeb' Tzaq, Chilu, Los Cimientos, Nim Poco, and Pueblo Viejo.

San Miguel Chicaj is known for its large Catholic church.

== Society ==
In Achi society, youth and adults interact because the elders instill in the new generations the preservation of traditions and customs. It is believed that the elders have overcome great obstacles to transmit this knowledge.

=== Education ===
There is a lack of bilingual schools, so illiteracy is common.

== Culture ==
=== Religion ===
The Achi religion is a syncretic complex of Christianity-animism, which is why there are many sacred shrines and mounds.

=== Traditional medicine ===
The Achi have traditional empirical knowledge based in the use of temazcales, herbs, and medicinal plants. The work of the midwives is highly valued.

=== Cuisine ===
==== Drinks ====
The main drinks in the Achi cuisine are:

- atol blanco (white atole)
- tres cocimientos (three concoctions)
- shuco
- atol de arroz (rice atole)
- arroz con leche (rice pudding; literally "rice with milk")

The first three are made from corn. The atol blanco and tres cocimientos can be made with white or yellow corn, while shuco is made with black corn. Atol de arroz is made with panela de dulce and the essence of atol blanco. Atol de arroz is made with rice and milk, cow's or powdered. The drinks are made by the women and are used as a snack for workers and for the family. The custom of making these drinks is passed from mother to daughter.

==== Foods ====
The two most well-known dishes are pinol and bochbol (or boschbol).

Pinol is made with roasted corn, which is ground. Then, other seasonings and chompipe (turkey) are added.

In the creation of the bochbol, tender ayote leaves, corn dough, toasted ayote seed (which is then ground), and tomato are used. The bochboles are shaped in small cylindrical rolls which are then placed in a pot on the fire to be cooked. When they are served at the table, the ground seeds are added as well as the tomato. The custom is to eat them hot.

Pinol is a food for special parties, while bochbol is a commonly consumed food. The recipes are passed from mothers to daughters.

=== Clothing ===
The clothing of the Achi is made with traditional instruments, and stands out for its colorfulness.

The male attire was commonly created by the woman. Using cotton, she used the same thread to weave the shirt, the white pants, and the red sash. The man was in charge of planting the cotton and when it was harvested, he dedicated himself to the production of the thread and a natural paint was used to dye the prepared thread black.

Modernity has influenced the loss of the costumes. There are few people who wear these costumes made with the backstrap loom and natural colors.

In the past, women made their own güipil and its trim, both of which were black. At present, women who live in rural areas continue to make their own güipil, but not the trim, as they are the most technical, using the fine threads and colors from the western part of the country. The red trim was created later; it is manufactured in the urban area of Rabinal and other places of the Achi region. As well as the creation of the colored ribbon, the cord and the uxaryo (collar) were brown or black.

In both cases, the costumes had two variants: ceremonial and everyday wear.

==== Feminine dress ====
The feminine dress of the Achi includes:

- Güipil: It has various colors, figures, embroidered with different names and thoughts related to the life of the human being. The meaning of the figures is a reserved matter for the women, as they weave without knowing the symbolism.
- Corte (trim)
- Cinta en colores (colored ribbon)
- Cordón (cord)
- Uxaryo (collar or necklace)
- Cordel (cord)

==== Masculine dress ====
The masculine dress of the Achi includes:

- Camisa (shirt)
- Pantalón blanco (calsonsillo Blanco) (white pants, white underpants)
- Banda roja (red ribbon)

==== Meaning of colors ====
Each color used is particular as it represents certain things in the life of the human being.

- White: Represents the dawn of every day, color of bones and teeth, purity and well-being.
- Red: Connotes life, strength, the sun's rays that warm and chase away the darkness, and the blood that circulates in every human being.
- Black: Symbolizes the hair, the pupil of the eye, the night when the human being rests for having worked during the day, it is where the sun hides, where the dead lie.
- Yellow: Symbolizes the similarity with yellow, black, red and white corn, and the production of excellent crops and the family.
- Green: Embodies nature, the green area of the valleys, and all kinds of plantations.
- Blue or light blue: Represents the great rivers, lakes, seas and the color of the sky.
- Brown: Symbolizes the color of the earth. The cordel (cord) of the same color, used to tie women's hair, was very popular for a long time, in addition to the cinta (ribbon). In recent times, the cordel and the cinta can only be seen in the most remote communities.

== Economy and production ==
Rabinal is famous for producing the sweetest oranges in the country.

San Jerónimo is well known for being where the best haciendas and vineyards of the Dominicans were located. In this region, people of African origin were "introduced" to work in the plantations.

In addition to the production of oranges and other crops, other outstanding activities are: handicrafts in Morro (jícaras, huchas, chinchines and guacales) made of clay, maguey, and wicker.

Rabinal is known for its traditional markets. Located in the Zamaneb valley, Rabinal was an important trading post. Ceramics, textiles, oranges, pinol, boxboles, and atoles are traded. For its January festival, pack animals are traded.

=== Textiles ===
An important part of the Achi culture, textiles are made with the telar de cintura (backstrap loom) or palitos (sticks), and in the way of Ixchel. In the production, processes are followed such as: placing the thread in the loom, separating the thread, placing other threads to embroider, and forming the different figures.

On these looms, they create güipiles, bandas (sashes), servilletas (napkins), and manteles (tablecloths). The activity is carried out by housewives, who share the knowledge by teaching it to their daughters. The cortes (trims) or enaguas (petticoats) are made by men on telares de pie (standing looms).

They use ixkak, white and brown dyed cotton. The raw material is collected at the end of winter and is called mish.

=== Ceramics ===
The artistic objects created by the Achi are traded at markets of all levels, including internationally. In both types of ceramics, whether handmade or made with technology, the work is passed from generation to generation.

There are also glazed and aniline-painted ceramics, typical of Rabinal and Chicaj. They are used to personify dances such as Rabinal Achí, Venado, Negritos, La Conquista, Torito and Animales.

==== Handmade ceramics ====
First, the raw material is obtained at a communal plot called "capilla del barro" (chapel of clay), then it is left to dry in the sun, then water is poured and the mud is stamped until it is very smooth, so it is ready for use. To give it shape, they turn it with the body creating pots, jars, pitchers, jugs, skillets, and bowls. They make shapes, painted in red clay which turns white when burned. Both the red clay, and the stone it is extracted from, have a natural origin. The handmade pottery is burned in the open air, in a flat place, surrounded by dung and wrapped entirely in dry straw (zacate or zacatón).

==== Ceramics made with technology ====
For the production of this type of pottery, the potter's wheel is used. The wheel is turned with the feet, leaving the hands free to mold the piece. For the creation of large and tall pieces, the pieces are made in parts. They are also decorated, then burned in a kiln. After burning, they are painted. The use of the wheel allows the creation of vases, flowerpots, lamps, amphorae, and tableware.

=== Basketry ===
The Achi practice basketry by weaving hard, semi-hard, and flat fibers to create baskets of different uses and sizes. These handicrafts are produced mainly in Cubulco, San Miguel Chicaj, Salamá, and Purulhá.

=== Woodworking ===
People in the Achi municipalities practice woodworking by making furniture of different woods, both fine and common. Chinchines (maracas), rattles, guitars, and violins are made in Rabinal, San Miguel Chicaj, Salamá, and Purulhá. Masks for ceremonies and parties are made in Granados and Rabinal. Toys are made in San Jerónimo.

=== Metalworking ===
Metalwork varies by region. Only in Cubulco, Rabinal, San Miguel Chicaj and Purulhá do people use wrought iron to make door knockers, balconies, doors, and ironwork. In Salamá and Rabinal, tin is used for lanterns, candelabras, and candlesticks.

=== Fireworks ===
In Rabinal, Salamá and Purulhá, fireworks are made with gunpowder for familial, religious, and civic festivities.

=== Chinchines and guacales ===
Chinchines (maracas) guacales (alternatively spelled huacales; bowls made of morro husks) are made with the raw morro material, obtained from the tree of the same name. First, the morros are collected, and they must be ripe. They use large ones to create guacales, and medium and small ones are used to make chinchines.

Once collected, the morro are cooked in a barrel. The baseado (base) is made using special instruments, it is also sanded with a special blade. After this complex process, they are painted and special decorations are added, using natural and artificial paints. This practice is passed on from parents to children.

There are chinchines with zoomorphic (animal), phytomorphic (vegetable) or anthropomorphic (human) forms. According to historian Luis Luján Muñoz, the oldest pieces have their owners' names written on them and sometimes have text that alludes to the events for which they were made.

The morro and the jícara are processed in three ways:

- Carving the jícara in its natural color.
- Coloring the items with palo amarillo and achiote to create the red tone.
- Providing the black color with ocote soot and embedding it with a fat removed from an insect called niij.

It is then rubbed with a cloth to polish it, and then carved to create landscapes, human and animal figures, as well as names and various symbols. This is how jícaras, guacales and chinchines are made.

Rabinal and San Miguel Chicaj have the largest production of these goods.

=== Importance of the niij ===
The niij (Llaveia sp. Homoptera: Margarodidae) is an insect that biologists classify in the "scale" group (in the sub-order Homoptera). Their eggs are laid on jocote, piñón, or ixcanal trees. The niiij is related to the cochinilla (Dactylopius coccus), according to Universidad Rafael Landívar biologist Charles MacVean.

The fat extracted from the niij is rubbed against the dry morro, becoming a plant-drying oil or a kind of wax, which when mixed with tizne (fine charcoal from ocote) becomes a lacquer-like film. It is lustrous, water-resistant, heat-resistant, abrasion-resistant, and non-toxic. It has a long traditional usein cooking utensils. In Mexico, it is mixed with achiote, creating a red color. With the mixture of the sap of the palo amarillo, the yellow color is produced.

There are accounts by Diego de Landa and Bernardino de Sahagún, who were the first to document such practices, similar to the current use. Sahagún, in his writings of 1582, reports that it was also used as a medicine for skin and throat diseases, uterine affections, inflammation of the testicles, and as an antidote for poisonous mushrooms.

There are historical records that show that it inhabited from Sinaloa, Mexico to Chiriquí, Panama, but at altitudes of less than 1,372 meters.

De todos los sitios mencionados en la región mesoamericana, los únicos donde actualmente se encuentra el niij, se practica su crianza y a la vez se utiliza artesanalmente son Rabinal y Chiapa de Corzo.
Of all the sites mentioned in the Mesoamerican region, the only ones where the niij is currently found, where it is bred and used in handicrafts, are Rabinal and Chiapa de Corzo.

— Charles MacVean

=== Other products ===
They also produce rope, palm products, wax, leather, construction materials, musical instruments (such as the tun and the chirimía or shawm), and tulle.

== Festivals and traditional ceremonies ==
The Achi share their customs from generation to generation. Their ceremonies revolve around the cofradías (fraternal groups) and the duty of the members to maintain the proper conduct of the festivities.

Also noteworthy are the celebrations of Easter, Christmas and Christmas Eve. The Achi religion is a syncretic complex of Christianity-animism, which is why there are many sacred shrines and mounds. The most sanctified are Chipichek, Chusxan, B'ele tz'ak and Cuwajuexij.

The Tzolk'in calendar directs the agricultural rites and ritual cosmogony.

=== Major festivals ===
==== Calendar of Achi festivals ====
Municipality	Date	Patron saint
Salamá	17 September	San Mateo
Cubulco	25 July	Santiago Apóstol
El Chol	8 December	Virgen de Concepción
Granados	29 June	San Pedro
Purulhá	13 June	San Antonio de Padua
Rabinal	25 January	San Pablo
San Jerónimo	30 September	San Jerónimo
San Miguel Chicaj	29 September	San Miguel Arcángel

==== Fiesta de la Virgen del Patrocinio ====
The Fiesta de la Virgen del Patrocinio (Festival of the Patron Virgin) is celebrated in Rabinal. A carved image consisting of novenas is shared from house to house. This tradition has been practiced since the 18th century. The family requesting la Virgen must have an exemplary home in the eyes of the community, and that the father and mother must be married, religiously and legally. The couple that has this right is called the "mayordomos de la cofradía de la Virgen" (stewards of the Virgin's cofradía), and a novena in her honor is held in their home. These activities take place from November 18 to November 22. During this period, the Convite de Rabinal and Santa Cruz del Quiché are presented and the cofradía members celebrate with fireworks.

The legend of the Virgen del Patrocinio is well known by local historians, who say that in the mid-eighteenth century, a woman appeared to an old man who was cutting wood on the summit of San Miguel Chicaj, asking him to tell the priest of Rabinal to go to confession. The woodcutter then sent the message to the priest, who was incredulous. Some time later, the lady materialized in the priest's dream, asking him to confess her. When he awoke, he went to the summit, where the image that is still known as the Virgen del Patrocinio appeared to him.

==== Rabinal Achí ====
The Rabinal Achí is a nationally and internationally recognized Kʼicheʼ-language performance. Of pre-Hispanic origin, it is currently performed exclusively in the municipality of Rabinal. It is performed during the Festival of San Pablo Apóstol, 17 January to 25 January. Seven main characters participate.

This drama portrays the 13th century proclamation of the Rabinal people to the Kʼicheʼ rulers. They refuse to pay tribute as the rulers destroyed the towns of the valley. Kʼicheʼ Achí is captured, imprisoned, and sentenced by the ruling court of the Rabinal. He is sacrificed after saying goodbye to his people.

As part of the celebration, each year a new Alí Ajaw (Achí Princess) of Rabinal is elected. In 2004 the chosen one was Albertina Alvarado López of the Xococ village, a primary school teacher, who indicated that she would encourage the government to care for children, since infants are the present and future of Guatemala. She was joined in the proclamation by Rosa Glendy Pirir Coloch, her predecessor.

In 2005, Karla Yolanda López López was elected for the 2005–2006 term.

For the 2007–2008 term, Ana Julieta López Chen was elected. In a ballot of four candidates, Vivian Adriana Chen Piox, Rosalina Tot Morente and Ana Leticia López Yol also competed. Ana Julieta was awarded the crown and the chachal on 17 January 2007.

Rabinal means "Lugar de la Hija del Señor" (Place of the Daughter of the Lord). Rabinal Achí is xajooj tun which means "dance of the tun".

=== Cofradías ===
Among the Achi, there are highly consolidated social organizations, called cofradías. In Rabinal there are 16, in San Miguel Chicaj there are 8, and in Salamá there are 3. There is also presence of cofradías in Cubulco and San Jerónimo.

The cofradías are part of Achi roots and the culture of their ancestors. At present, the elders transmit this knowledge to their children through oral tradition. One of the positions that has a strict hierarchy is that of Qajawxeel, the president of the cofradía.

The cofradías are also present in Mayan festivities, in which the Achi venerate an image, which represents a being that is important during their life. In Rabinal, the cofradía of Corpus Christi is celebrated 60 days after Holy Week, in celebration of the "Divino" (Divine), called Ajaaw in the Achi language. The cofradía of Corpus Christi is one of the most important cofradías of Rabinal, because in their celebration they invoke the rain, wind, and clouds to have a good harvest in the planting of corn, which is sacred and the basis of their food.

=== Dances ===
The Achi perform multiple and varied dances. These also play an important role in the transmission of the knowledge of the custom. Their best-known deities are the Ajaaw (the Divine), uk'u'x kaaj, and uk'u'x uleew to whom permission is requested before performing the ceremonial dances. Elements of nature such as rain, wind, clouds, and corn are considered sacred and part of their subsistence.

==== Dancing ritual ====
In general, all dances are practiced in rehearsals before being performed in public. In these rehearsals, elders guide the young people through each of the different scenes and movements. Before performing these activities, offerings must be made to uk'u'x kaaj and uk'u'x uleew to give the necessary permission and prevent problems. This is done by ajq'iij (lieutenant) and consists of making a vigil with all the masks of the participants, using candles, incense, liquor (awasib'al), invoking the ancestors who have participated in these dances.

There are marimba ensembles of all kinds, including drums, whistles, and chirimías (shawms). The use of three important instruments stands out: the tun, of pre-Hispanic origin, which accompanies with long trumpets the dance of the Rabinal Achí; the adufe, a square drum of Arab origin; and three small drums called aj ec, which is used in the dance of the Negritos in Rabinal. Harp, violin and guitarrilla groups, with their corresponding "puñetero" or "bordonero", of Q'eqchi' ancestry, are common in Baja Verapaz.

==== Regional dances ====
In Rabinal, there is diversity of dances for the holidays:

- Los Negritos
- De Cortés
- Nima Xajooj
- Moros y Cristianos
- San Jorge
- Patzka'
- Ixiim Keej
- Komoon Eq
- B'alam Keej
- El Costeño
- Charamiyeex (Soto Mayor)
- Aj Eq
- El Venado
- De Toritos
- La Conquista
- El Chico Mudo
- Los Huehuechos
- La Sierpe
- Los Animalitos
- Las Flores

In Rabinal, they also perform the well-known ethno-historic dance, the Rabinal Achí (Xajooj Tuun).

In Cubulco, the Palo Volador is well known, as well as the dances of:

- El Venado
- De Toritos
- Mexicanos
- De Cortés
- El Costeño
- El Chico Mudo
- Los Huehuechos
- Los Negritos
- Los Animalitos
- Los Judíos

The dances of Salamá are El Venado and El Costeño.

In Purulhá, the dances are El Venado and Los Mazates.

In San Miguel Chicaj, they perform El Baile de la Pichona and De Toritos.

== Oral tradition ==
There are several types of storytellers in oral traditions who are valued for their knowledge of legends.

There are specialized storytellers, whose qualities include knowing how to pass on the historical memory of their people, giving advice to the community, and being true sentinels of the cultures of the region. For the Achi, this storyteller has the title of ajtzij (Anciano Mayordomo; Elder Steward).

The other type of storyteller is the occasional one, who narrates with less mastery than the ajtzij, although they retain a large part of the wisdom and the ancestral traditions of their people.

The legends that are narrated during rituals by the ajtzij on sacred hills and shrines recall the mythical history, which for the Achí of Rabinal, is true.

An important genre is that of the Señores y Dueños de Cerros (Owners of the Hills), largely shared with those of Alta Verapaz.

=== Rajawales ===
It is said in Cubulco that the cerro Cajiup (Cajiup Hill) in the valle del Urram (Urram valley) in Rabinal, is inhabited by the rajawales, which are spirits of the community and the region.

On one occasion, a couple of merchants who were going to sell ceramics in Rabinal stayed to sleep on the cerro Cajiup, with a view of the top of the cerro de los Yaguales (Yaguales Hill). They were very hungry. One of them saw a deer coming out of the side of the road, so he captured it and killed it. They ate it for dinner and fell asleep. One of the two heard the voice from the cerro Cajiup telling the Yaguales that they had killed "su caballito" (his little horse), and that now he could not go to the farm, to his animals. or to watch over the corn, and he asked to borrow his dogs to avenge "su caballito".

"Why not, take them away," ("Como no, llévatelos,") said cerro de los Yaguales. The merchant got up, terrified, and told his companion what he had heard, but they thought they were dreaming. When the man who heard the voices returned home, his wife told him that the coyotes came one night and killed all the chickens without eating them. Then, the man was frightened and went to ask forgiveness from the Señor del Cerro (Lord of the Hill), "doing a ritual for him" ("haciéndole una costumbre") to calm his anger.

=== Juan Caleb ===
In El Chol, the ajtzij say that on one occasion, a man named Juan Caleb offered a baile de los moros (dance of the Moors) for the Virgen de la Concepción (The Virgin Mary). Due to his lack of money, he went to the cerro Pacoc (Pacoc Hill) and began to cry. Then, an old man appeared and led him to the inside of the hill, showing him all kinds of costumes and telling him to choose.

The clothing that the Señor del Cerro offered to Juan Caleb was the most beautiful and striking and everyone admired it. Juan Caleb could not keep the secret and told them everything, which angered the Señor del Cerro Pacoc. With a great wind, he took the costumes away from the dancers in full celebration and Juan Caleb died soon after.

but due to his lack of money, he went to the Pacoc hill and began to cry; then, an old man appeared and directed him to the interior of the hill and showed him all kinds of costumes and told him to choose. The costume that the Lord of the Hill offered to Juan Caleb was the most beautiful and striking; everyone admired it, but Juan Caleb could not keep the secret and told everything, for that reason the Lord of the Pacoc Hill got angry, and by means of a great wind took away the costumes to the dancers during the celebration, and Juan Caleb died soon after.

Variants of this legend are found in every municipality of the region, but especially in Salamá, San Miguel Chicaj and Granados, and in Purulhá with those of Pocomchí ancestry.

=== Origin of corn ===
The Achi and Pocomchí indicate in their myths that they spread corn from their department to Guatemala and the world.

There are variations of the legend "When the God of the World locked away the corn" ("Cuando el Dios Mundo encerró al maíz"), which is deeply rooted in Cubulco, San Jerónimo, San Miguel Chicaj, and Purulhá.

In Granados, it is said that the cuervo (crow) found the corn locked in the cerro de Las Burras (Las Burras Hill), and for this reason there is a shrine on its summit, which is very sacred for the inhabitants of the site.

=== Patron saints ===
Current and widespread legends speak about the origin of the towns and their founding patron saints. The abuelos rezadores (religious-leader elders) of Rabinal say that in ancient times, when San Pablo lived in Tzamaneb', Rabinal, there was a man named Yew Achí or Kʼicheʼ, who stole San Pablo's children. The saint could never confront him because Yew Achí arrived at night. When San Pablo realized, his children had already been stolen from him. They say that Yew Achí took the children in a mecapal by the dozen.

Santiago, the patron saint of Kub'ul (Cubulco), noticed what was happening to his younger brother and asked him what was going on. San Pablo began to cry, and Santiago suggested to him that they switch towns. Santiago, who was the strongest, started to fight Yew Achí, but the Yew Achí hid under the earth and the water. Santiago controlled him when he tried to come out, but Yew Achí did not allow him to do so.

So that "he would not be bothering him" ("no lo estuviera fastidiando"), Yew Achí apologized to Santiago and offered all his riches so he would not be killed. Santiago did not want riches, as he was poor and good, so he did not forgive Yew Achí. Before Yew Achí was killed, he asked for permission to shout seven times, cursing the people of Cubulco. Because of that, Santiago had to stay in that place as protector and patron of the town.

There are variants of this legend in Purulhá, Salamá and San Jerónimo, which are also characterized by the same details and elements.

=== Kabracán (earthquake) ===
The atzij say that the Dios Mundo is supported by four giant men, who when they get tired of holding it all up ("de sostenerlo a todo"), change their position, and that is when earthquakes are generated.

For this reason, earthquakes are called cabracanes in the region. It is also said that "as soon as the quake starts, the women must make 'tur tur' like they do when they call the hens." ("en cuanto empieza a temblar, las mujeres deben hacer 'tur tur' como cuando llaman a las gallinas.") They do this so that Kabracán does not take the heart of the corn, because it is the blood of the inhabitants of Baja Verapaz.

A variant of this legend is known in San Jerónimo as "Sipac and the Three Spirits of Corn" ("Sipac y los Tres Espíritus del Maíz") and in Purulhá as "Sipac, The Powerful" ("Sipac, El Poderoso").

In San Miguel Chicaj, there is a legend that tells of the struggle between the snake, the angel of lightning, and the spirit of corn.

=== La Monja Blanca ===
In ancient times, there was a Gran Señor (Great Lord), owner of hills and valleys, who came down to the village once a year. One day he saw a very beautiful woman with whom he fell in love. The Gran Señor went to the house of the young woman to ask for her as a wife, giving as dowry a chest full of money. The woman decided to live with the Gran Señor, who spoiled her. However, the woman's parents took advantage of the situation to extort money, land, corn, cocoa, and other riches from their son-in-law.

The woman suffered from shame due to her parents' greed. The parents wanted more money and went to visit the Gran Señor, but saw nothing, only a light through the trees. They believed that the light was the spirit of the girl. When the Gran Señor came near, upon seeing them he turned them into tree trunks. After mourning his wife for many days, he turned the light into a beautiful white flower. Thus, the Monja Blanca (white nun) was created. It is the national flower, adorning every corner of Baja Verapaz.

=== Animistic legends ===
In Salamá, el Sombrerón is a giant who wears a big hat and watches over the animals at night. It is only seen before dawn.

La Siguanaba is found in all the towns and villages of the department.

La Llorona in Chol, shows a very different variant, since instead of drowning her son, she eats him to enact revenge on her husband who had a relationship with a woman from Cobán.

In San Miguel Chicaj, it is said that the siren was a disobedient woman who lived on the outskirts of San Miguel and bathed in the Ixcayán River on Good Friday, so God punished her by turning her into a siren.

Other scary creatures are la Siguamonta, el Cadejo and los Tzizimites, of the sugar cane, which is abundant in San Jerónimo, Purulhá, and Cubulco.

=== Griffin ===
The griffin (el pájaro grifo) is characterized as a western literary figure from Salamá, and several stories are found in the mestizo population.

In the neighborhood of Calvario, the story of the griffin is told. It tells of the adventures of a boy, inhabitant of El Chol, who has to obtain feathers of a magic bird called griffin to heal and marry the daughter of the Gran Señor of the water country (país del agua). After a series of incredible events, the teenager catches the bird and goes to live in the palace of the Señor del Agua (Lord of Water).

=== Other literary figures ===
A widespread tale is "Juan Oso" among the mestizos of Granados, and "Blanca Flor y Rosa Flor" ("White Flower and Pink Flower) in El Chol.

Pedro Urdemales (or Ardimales), Tío Conejo (Uncle Rabbit) and Tío Coyote (Uncle Coyote) persist as characters in popular tales in San Miguel Chicaj and San Jerónimo.

In Salamá, riddle-tales such as "Pan Mató a Panda" ("Bread Killed the Panda") and "Las Tres Adivinanzas" ("The Three Riddles) are well-known. Also in Salamá, part of the traditional oral poetry of medieval times is preserved, with the romances "Madre que sufría" ("Mother who suffered"), "Alfonsito llorón" ("Crying little Alfonso"), and "Dile, dile golondrina" ("Tell them, tell them, little bird"). There are also modern couplets, décimas, and romancillos (short romances) in the region.

There is a myth in Rabinal that on the top of the Cerro Cuxbalám (Cuxbalám Hill) is the entrance to Xibalbá, the Maya underworld. It is said that the center of Xibalbá is Rabinal, where the men of Rabinal continue to play pelota.
