= Plan de Sánchez massacre =

1982 mass killing of indigenous people by Guatemalan armed forces

Plan de Sánchez lies in central Guatemala

The Plan de Sánchez massacre took place in the Guatemalan village of Plan de Sánchez, Baja Verapaz department, on 18 July 1982. Over 250 people (mostly women and children, and almost exclusively ethnic Achi Maya) were abused and murdered by members of the armed forces and their paramilitary allies.

The killings took place during one of the most violent phases of Guatemala's Civil War, which pitted various groups of left-wing insurgents against the government and the armed forces. After assuming power in March 1982, de facto President Gen. Efraín Ríos Montt embarked on a military campaign that largely succeeded in breaking the insurgency, but at a terrible cost in human lives and human rights violations. The massacre in Plan de Sánchez was an element in the government's scorched earth strategy, and the village was targeted because of the authorities' suspicions that the inhabitants were harbouring or otherwise supporting guerrilla groups.

After the massacre, the village was practically abandoned for a number of years, and the survivors were told that reprisals would follow if they spoke about the incident or revealed the location of the numerous mass graves they had helped to dig. With the gradual return to democracy that began in the late 1980s and early 1990s, some of the survivors felt they could start to talk about the killings without fearing for their lives. Accusations were filed with the authorities in 1992 and, in 1993, a criminal investigation was launched. However, faced with delays and other irregularities in the proceedings, and stonewalled by a National Reconciliation Law that granted amnesties to the suspected perpetrators, the survivors saw that Guatemala's domestic legal remedies were ineffective in this case. They consequently decided to lodge a complaint with the Inter-American Commission on Human Rights (IACHR), the supranational human rights arm of the Organisation of American States, in 1996.

The IACHR began processing the complaint, received a partial recognition of the state's institutional responsibility from the democratically elected president Alfonso Portillo in the first year of his term, and finally referred the case to the Inter-American Court of Human Rights for judgement and settlement. In 2004, the Inter-American Court issued two judgements, in which it established Guatemala's liability in the case and ordered an extensive package of monetary, non-monetary and symbolic forms of compensation for the survivors and the next-of-kin of the deceased.

== National context ==
1982 was one of the bloodiest years in Guatemala's 36-year-long history of internal conflict (1960–1996).

On 23 March 1982, army troops commanded by junior officers staged a coup d'état to prevent the assumption of power by Gen. Ángel Aníbal Guevara, the hand-picked successor of outgoing president Gen. Romeo Lucas García who had won a disputed election two weeks earlier. The coup leaders asked retired Gen. Efraín Ríos Montt to negotiate the departure of both Lucas and Guevara.

Ríos Montt, who had been the candidate of the Christian Democracy Party in the 1974 presidential election and was widely regarded as having been denied his victory through fraud, accepted the appointment. He formed a three-member military junta that annulled the 1965 constitution dissolved Congress, and suspended all political parties. After a few months, he dismissed his junta colleagues and assumed the de facto title of President of the Republic; in his inaugural address, Ríos Montt – a lay pastor in the evangelical Protestant Church of the Word – stated that his presidency resulted from the will of God.

The country's guerrilla forces and their leftist allies denounced Ríos Montt, who sought to defeat the guerrilla insurgency with a combination of military action and economic reforms; in his words, "beans and rifles" (frijoles y fusiles). An army officer was quoted in The New York Times of 18 July 1982 (the exact day of the Plan de Sánchez killings) as telling an audience of indigenous people in Cunén, in the department of El Quiché, that: "If you are with us, we'll feed you; if not, we'll kill you."

The government began to form local "civilian self-defence patrols" (the paramilitary forces known as patrullas de autodefensa civil or PACs). Participation was, in theory, voluntary, but in practice, many campesinos, especially in the north-west, had no choice but to join either the PACs or the guerrillas. The country's conscript army, supported by the PACs, recaptured practically all the guerrilla-held territory – guerrilla activity lessened and was mostly limited to hit-and-run operations. However, this partial victory was won at an enormous cost in civilian deaths.

Ríos Montt's brief presidency was probably the most violent period of the 36-year internal conflict, which resulted in about 200,000 deaths of mostly unarmed, mostly indigenous civilians. Although leftist guerrillas and right-wing death squads also engaged in summary executions, forced disappearances, and torture of non-combatants, the vast majority of human rights violations were carried out by the military and the PACs they controlled. The internal conflict is described in great detail in the report of the Historical Clarification Commission (Comisión para el Esclarecimiento Histórico, or CEH), which estimates that government forces and their paramilitary confederates were responsible for 93% of the violations.

On 8 August 1983, Ríos Montt was deposed by his own Minister of Defence, Gen. Óscar Humberto Mejía Victores, who succeeded him as de facto president of Guatemala. Victims of the period, organised in the Asociación para Justicia y Reconciliación (AJR) and their legal representatives the Centro para Acción Legal en Derechos Humanos (CALDH) brought a criminal case against Ríos Montt in 2001. He was convicted of genocide and crimes against humanity in a national court in May 2013. The status of the conviction is unclear following intervention by the Constitutional Court.

== Local context ==
The central Guatemalan department of Baja Verapaz comprises eight municipalities, one of which is Rabinal (15°6′0″N 90°27′0″W), some 70 km to the north of Guatemala City. In 1982, the municipality was made up of the municipal seat of Rabinal town, along with another 14 villages and 60 hamlets. Among the villages was Plan de Sánchez, located in a hilly woodland area some 9 km from the town of Rabinal. The local inhabitants were overwhelmingly Achi Maya Native Americans. Achi is one of the 21 varieties of the Maya language recognised in Guatemala; according to a 2002 government census, it was spoken by some 105,000 people in the Baja Verapaz highlands.

== The events of July 1982 ==
Since early 1982, the inhabitants of the area had been facing increasing pressure from the authorities. Many of the local men had refused to participate in the self-defence patrols and, as a result, the military kept a strong presence in the area. Many men fled their homes for the mountains, leaving the womenfolk and children behind. Others had already, before the massacre, filed formal complaints – reporting the armed forces' constant threatening behaviour and harassment – with the justice of the peace in Rabinal, but these allegations were never investigated; on the contrary, the men who lodged the complaints were fined.

In early July 1982, a military aircraft flew over the village and dropped a number of bombs on areas close to several homes. On 15 July, an army detachment set up camp in the village and began house-to-house inspections, asking after the menfolk and threatening the villagers.

Sunday, 18 July, was market-day in Rabinal. The pathways and roads of the municipality were, from an early hour, crowded with people from local villages and farms taking their goods to market. The village of Plan de Sánchez was one of several settlements crisscrossed by the network of routes leading to the municipal seat.

At around 08:00 that Sunday morning, soldiers at the military detachment fired two 105-mm mortar shells at the village. One of these landed to the east of the main group of houses; the other to the west. Later that same day, between 14:00 and 15:00, a military detachment arrived in Plan de Sánchez. This force of some 60 men – comprising regular army (led by a captain and a lieutenant), PAC patrolmen, police, and civilians dressed in military fatigues and armed with assault rifles – took up stations at the village's points of entry and exit, heading off people from other settlements returning from market. Others went from house to house, gathering the inhabitants together. At this point, some of the men succeeded in fleeing the round-up and took to the surrounding woods and hills.

The younger women were sent to one house, with the men, children, and older women directed to another. A group of around twenty of the younger women (aged between 12 and 20) were separated from the main group and taken to another building; there, they were humiliated, accused of supporting the guerrillas, beaten, and raped. A handful of these women managed to escape and take refuge in the surrounding countryside, while the remainder were killed.

The children were separated from the main group and beaten and kicked to death. Then, at around 17:00, the soldiers threw two hand grenades into the house where the adults were being held and began spraying the walls with automatic gunfire. Residents of nearby villages and those from Plan de Sánchez who was observing the massacre from vantage points in the surrounding hills report that intense gunfire continued until about 20:00 when the army set fire to the buildings. The armed forces finally left the village at around 23:00.

The next morning, some of those who had fled returned to the smoking ruins of their village. None of the bodies in the houses could be identified; many of the others who had fallen in the yards adjacent to the houses had bullet holes in their heads, chests, and backs, but identification of these victims was made difficult because dogs and other animals had partially devoured many of the charred corpses.

At around 15:00 on that Monday, two military commissioners and a squad of PAC patrolmen arrived in Plan de Sánchez and ordered the survivors to dig graves and bury the victims' remains, threatening them that the air force would bombard the village if they failed to comply. More than 20 clandestine communal graves were dug and filled. Meanwhile, the patrolmen ransacked the houses that had not been burned down, stealing personal property and livestock and destroying identification papers.

=== Witness testimony ===
They separated the children, and the girls of 15 to 20 years old. Then they began the massacre. First, they tortured the elderly, because they said the latter were guerrillas; then they threw two grenades and fired weapons… After executing the women, the men and the elderly, they took the children one by one, smashed them against the ground, and threw them into the flames. No one could escape because the Army had surrounded the entrance and exit of Plan de Sánchez, as well as the adjacent roads… [The next day] he braced himself to leave the place where he was hiding to go and examine the havoc that had been wrought. Together with his brothers, Juan, Buenaventura and Esteban, and with Eulalio Grave Ramírez, he put out the fire that was still consuming the corpses.

— Benjamín Manuel Jerónimo, Inter-American Court's reparations judgement.

They separated the girls who were 15 to 20 years old from this group, and took them to Guillerma Grave Manuel's house; they raped them; they broke their arms and legs, and then they killed them… The children were smashed against the floor, and then thrown into the flames together with their parents… At 8 pm, he was able to enter his own home and saw that his wife and three of his children were dead. He found one of his daughters alive; she had managed to escape, because she was buried under the bodies of her two siblings.

— Eulalio Grave Ramírez, Inter-American Court's reparations judgement.

My sister went shopping in Rabinal but when she got to the hamlet of Plan de Sánchez the army was already there. There they grabbed her and raped her in a house. There were fifteen girls raped and then they were riddled with bullets. Afterwards, they were buried by the people, in a clandestine cemetery.

— Unidentified female villager, Draining the Sea (CIIDH).

The witness heard her mother, who was walking through the village, scream and saw when they seized her nine-month-old nephew from her mother, with its shawl and everything, and took them to the house where all the people were gathered… At the time of the massacre, she was 13 or 14 years old. She lost her mother, sister, grandmother, aunts and all her cousins, even the babies… The following day, she was able to see the corpses, but only for a short time, because the soldiers granted three hours to bury her next of kin.

— Narcisa Corazón Jerónimo, Inter-American Court's reparations judgement.

== Aftermath ==
Over the ensuing months, because of regular visits by the army during which they were threatened, harassed, and intimidated, most of the survivors abandoned the village for the mountains, other towns and villages, or Guatemala City. In 1985, they began to trickle back and were allowed to resettle in Plan de Sánchez and work their land, provided that they served in the PACs and remained subject at all times to military oversight. By 1987, some 20 families were again living in the village, albeit under strict orders from the military not to discuss the massacre. The harassment and threats from the military and paramilitaries continued, and the requirement that they patrol with the PACs was enforced until the peace accords were signed and the civilian self-defence patrols were dissolved in 1996.

=== Witness testimony ===
The militarisation of Plan de Sánchez prevented them from continuing their ancestral traditions. Before the massacre, they performed individual and private ceremonies, called "devotions". Several of the older men were responsible for officiating these acts, but many of them died in the massacre and their knowledge could not be transmitted to the new generations… Owing to the repression exercised by the Army and the obligation for the young men to do military service, the latter lost their faith, their devotion for the traditions and knowledge of their ancestors, and did not want to continue the traditions… They performed a few Mayan ceremonies very infrequently because the military agents did not allow these rites, alleging that they were practicing witchcraft against their enemies."

– Benjamín Manuel Jerónimo, Inter-American Court's reparations judgement.

The witness was obliged to enlist in the Army for 30 months. On 31 October 1987, he left the military barracks to return to Plan de Sánchez… [and] was obliged to join the patrol again. The men who survived found second wives among women from other communities, because very few women were left in Plan de Sánchez after the massacre."

– Buenaventura Manuel Jerónimo, Inter-American Court's reparations judgement.

The older people who were responsible for officiating the Mayan ceremonies died in the massacre and the traditions died with them, because the young people did not have anyone to teach them… Military agents and the patrols monitored every meeting, so that they were afraid to hold their religious ceremonies. No one could speak freely or discuss the situation of repression and violence in which the community lived."

– Eulalio Grave Ramírez, Inter-American Court's reparations judgement.

== Death toll ==
Years later, the petition lodged with the Inter-American Commission on Human Rights by the survivors and next-of-kin set the death toll of the massacre at 268, and the Guatemalan state, in the later supranational proceedings, admitted its responsibility in that number of killings. However, the Inter-American Court of Human Rights published a list of named victims that numbered only 170, and various other reports on the incident quote figures of between 150 and 200. Forensic anthropologists working on the massacre site have exhumed fewer than 100 sets of remains.

The discrepancies in the various figures can be attributed to several factors: first of all, entire families were killed, and many of the survivors were subsequently scattered across the country. The absence of relatives made tallying the dead more difficult, as did the severe warnings the villagers received in the immediately ensuing years about what would happen if they discussed the massacre. The fact that many of the victims were burnt alive in a single, small enclosure complicated the identification of remains and, to date, it is not certain that all the clandestine graves in the vicinity of Plan de Sánchez have been found.

== Domestic legal proceedings ==
On 10 December 1992, a group of villagers reported the existence of a clandestine grave in Plan de Sánchez and, on 7 May 1993, Ramiro de León Carpio, the country's human rights ombudsman (Procurador de los Derechos Humanos), lodged an official accusation with the public prosecution service, reporting the massacre that had taken place 11 years earlier.

A criminal investigation was begun by an investigating magistrate in Salamá, Baja Verapaz, and, on 8 June 1994, the Guatemalan Forensic Anthropology Team (EAFG) began examining the clandestine graves in the community. Two months later, the forensic anthropologists had exhumed a total of 84 corpses from 21 graves. An additional grave site was identified during the field work and, once the legal formalities had been met, the EAFG was able to examine it, and exhume four sets of human remains, in August 1996.

On 2 September 1996, Ombudsman Jorge Mario García Laguardia issued a historic resolution in which he denounced the massacre of Plan de Sánchez (and two others that took place in Rabinal the same year: Chichupac and Río Negro) as crimes against humanity, laid the blame for them firmly at the feet of the government and the military, and said that they had been carried out as part of a premeditated state policy.

In May 1997, the villagers named as plaintiffs in the criminal investigation gave the authorities a list of names of soldiers and patrolmen who had been involved in the massacre. In June 1997, their legal representatives the Centro para Acción Legal en Derechos Humanos (CALDH) requested ballistic tests on the spent cartridges found in the graves; the ballistic material was reported as "lost" by the prosecution service and did not resurface until February 2000.

Following sustained efforts by victims and CALDH, and the appointment of a new Attorney General in Guatemala, five direct perpetrators were convicted in domestic criminal proceedings and in October 2012 their conviction was upheld on appeal.

== Supranational legal proceedings ==
In October 1996, faced with constant delays and other irregularities in the domestic proceedings, the survivors instructed their legal representatives in both national and supranational proceedings, the Centro para Acción Legal en Derechos Humanos (CALDH), to lodge a complaint with the Inter-American Commission on Human Rights (IACHR). The IACHR is the agency of the Organisation of American States charged with overseeing the American Convention on Human Rights, a continental human rights instrument that Guatemala ratified in 1978, and responsible for ensuring justice for victims of human rights abuses when domestic legal systems fail.

In their filing, they accused the Guatemalan state of violating the victims' human rights by allowing its agents to kill civilian men, women, and children and by failing to respond to that situation with measures of judicial protection and guarantees. Guatemala replied to the petition by stating that during the armed conflict both parties committed abuses, and that events such as those in Plan de Sánchez stand as testimony to that fact. It went on to say, however, that the villagers' petition was inadmissible since it had been presented extemporaneously and because the jurisdictional remedies offered by the domestic courts had not yet been exhausted. The petitioners countered that they had attempted to exhaust the domestic remedies, but had been prevented from so doing by excessive procedural delays on the part of the state's judicial officers. Finding for the petitioners, the Commission declared the case admissible on 11 March 1999.

On 9 August 2000, during (failed) negotiations between the state, the petitioners, and the commission with a view to reaching a friendly settlement of this case and others, President Alfonso Portillo admitted the state's "institutional responsibility" for the massacre. On 28 February 2002, the IACHR issued a resolution recommending that the Guatemalan government:

1. Conduct a serious investigation to prosecute and punish those who perpetrated and masterminded the massacre.
2. Make reparations (including but not limited to financial compensation) to the survivors of the massacre, to the next-of-kin of the dead, and to the village as a community.
3. Take steps to ensure that similar incidents did not occur in the future.

Two months later, after consulting with the petitioners, the Inter-American Commission referred the case to the contentious jurisdiction of the Inter-American Court of Human Rights.

Guatemala first lodged three exceptions with the Court, arguing, inter alia, that the case was not admissible because the available domestic remedies had not been exhausted and that the scope of President Portillo's admission of responsibility had been misconstrued. At the Court's public hearing on 23 April 2004, however, the state withdrew those exceptions. It then repeated the admission of responsibility extended by Alfonso Portillo in August 2000 and admitted that it had violated the human rights enshrined in Articles 1, 5, 8, 11, 12, 13, 16, 21, 21, 24, and 25 of the American Convention on Human Rights. It asked the victims for their forgiveness and expressed its willingness to make full amends. Guatemala did not, however, address the charges of genocide levelled at it by the Commission in its application to the Court, since that particular crime against humanity was not covered by the convention. The Court accepted the state's admission of guilt, issued a judgement to that effect on 29 April 2004, and proceeded with the reparations phase.

On 19 November 2004, the Inter-American Court issued its reparations judgement. In order to make full redress to the survivors of the massacre and to the next-of-kin of those who were killed, Guatemala was ordered to make compensatory payments to those individuals totalling US$7,996,836 – the highest award ever given by the Court.

In addition to the monetary redress, the Court ordered the state to fulfill its legal duties, undertake various infrastructure projects in the locality, and realise various symbolic acts of reparation and reconciliation:

- Conduct a proper investigation of the massacre, and identify and punish the guilty.
- Organise a ceremony in Plan de Sánchez at which high-ranking government officials would recognise the state's responsibility and honour the memory of the dead, to be covered by the media and conducted in both Spanish and Achi Maya.
- Translate the American Convention on Human Rights and the Court's two judgements into Achi Maya.
- Publish key sections of those judgements in its official gazette and in a major national newspaper (in both languages).
- Pay USD $25,000 for the upkeep of the village's memorial chapel to the massacre victims.
- Build houses in the village.
- Provide the survivors with any medical and psychological care they might require – free of charge, including medicines and supplies.
- In addition to regular budgeted government spending:
  - Promote the study and awareness of the Achi Maya language and culture in the affected communities.
  - Improve the municipality's road network, drinking water supply, and sewerage systems.
  - Provide the communities with qualified, bilingual schoolteachers.
  - Set up a health clinic in Plan de Sánchez and a health centre in the town of Rabinal.

All these items were to be completed within five years of the Court's judgement, with the state submitting annual progress reports until completion. Guatemala was also ordered to pay US$55,000 in costs.

The public ceremony required by the judgement was held in Plan de Sánchez on 18 July 2005, the 23rd anniversary of the massacre. It was attended by representatives of the government, led by Vice President Eduardo Stein, delegations from the IACHR and the International Centre for Human Rights Research (CIIDH), as well as survivors and relatives of the victims. During the ceremony, Stein apologised for the actions of the army, which had "unleashed bloodshed and fire to wipe out an entire community".

== Prosecution of soldiers and paramilitary members ==
Courts in Guatemala convicted five members of a paramilitary organization, Patrullas de Autodefensa Civil, of murder in the 1982 massacre. Each of the five were sentenced to 7710 years in prison on 21 March 2012.

== See also ==
- List of massacres in Guatemala
