= List of massacres in Guatemala =

Name	Date	Location	Deaths	Notes
Instituto Técnico de Agricultura massacre	November 13, 1971	Bárcena, Villa Nueva, Guatemala Department	2	A 21-year-old Basilio Martínez Avila killed two people with a machete at an agricultural school near Guatemala City. He wounded 15 others before being overpowered by other students.
Panzós massacre	May 29, 1978	Panzós	30-60	Residents of village of Panzós were killed by the army
Spanish Embassy Massacre	January 31, 1980	Guatemala City	36	Indigenous peasant activists were burnt alive alongside former vice president Eduardo Cáceres among others
Río Negro Massacre	March 13, 1982	Río Negro, Baja Verapaz	177	Women and children were abused and murdered
Plan de Sánchez massacre	July 18, 1982	Plan de Sánchez, Baja Verapaz	250	Mostly women and children, and almost exclusively ethnic Achi Maya were abused and murdered
Dos Erres massacre	December 6, 1982	Dos Erres, La Libertad, El Peten	226	Women, Children, Men, many had their heads bashed with hammers and thrown into a well. Others thrown in still alive.
Xamán massacre	5 October 1995	Chisec, Alta Verapaz Department	11	Members of the Guatemalan Army killed 11 people and injured 27 on a farm in Xamán
February 2007 Salvadoran congressmen killings	February 19, 2007	El Jocotillo, Guatemala City	4	Three members of the ARENA party of El Salvador — Eduardo D'Aubuisson, William Pichinte and José Ramón González, as well as their driver, Gerardo Ramírez — were found murdered near Guatemala City
Attack against a bus in Nicaragua	November 8, 2008	Zacapa department	16	An attack by drug traffickers causes the death of 16 foreigners who were on a bus in the department of Zacapa in the eastern part of the country. The victims, 15 Nicaraguans and on 1 Dutchman, were riddled with bullets inside the bus and later burned along with it. According to subsequent investigations, the motive for the attack was the alleged existence of drugs on the bus.
Los Cocos Massacre	15 May 2011	La Libertad, Petén Department	27	A group of drug traffickers from the Mexican cartel Los Zetas invade a farm in the department of Petén, in the north of the country, and kill 27 peasants by beheading.
2017 Roosevelt Hospital attack	16 August 2017	Guatemala City	7	While an MS-13 inmate was being transported, several armed men began shooting at the staff and prison guards who were carrying him. 5 minutes later, the gang members fled with the other member. The incident resulted in 7 dead and 12 injured
Chiquix massacre	18 December 2021	Village of Chiquix, Nahualá, Sololá department	13	Murder of 13 people, including three children, in an ambush committed by armed men by Territorial Dispute.
