= Sipakapense =

Sipakapense may refer to:

- Sipakapense people, an ethnic subgroup of the Maya from Sipacapa, Guatemala
- Sipakapense language, spoken by those people
