= Cubulco =

- Municipality of Guatemala

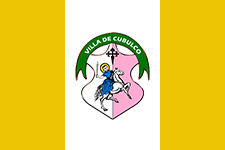
- Flag Seal

- Location in Guatemala
- Coordinates: 15°6′30″N 90°37′50″W
- Country: Guatemala
- Department: Baja Verapaz

Government
  - Mayor (2016-2020): Tomás Alonzo

Area
  - Total: 275 sq mi (711 km^{2})

Population (2018 census)
  - Total: 54,869
  - Density: 200/sq mi (77.2/km^{2})
- Climate: Aw

Cubulco is a small town, with a population of 10,681 (2018 census), located in the Guatemalan department of Baja Verapaz, at 15°6′30″N 90°37′50″W. It serves as the administrative seat for the surrounding municipality of the same name. The municipality covers an area of 711 km² and has a population of 54,869 (2018).

== History ==
=== Before the Spanish conquest ===
Worried about the defection of the aj K'ub'ul family chief (who had taken his family away in order to look for fertile and, above all, peaceful land which eventually became the modern Cubulco), the K'iche' king sent a group of soldiers to control every single movement of them. He was afraid that the aj K'ub'ul would look for reinforcements from other peoples in the area to form a strong army and then attack the K'iche's. The warriors settled to the east of the aj K'ub'ul and since the latter had moved away to look for peace and tranquility, they were a very peaceful community. The warriors then told the K'iche' king not to worry about the exiled group as they were peaceful.

As time went by, the K'iche' warriors realized that the lifestyle of the aj K'ub'ul was very different from what they were used to under the rule of their king, as they simply worked their land, harvested their crops and raised their families without having to worry about being invaded or called to fight in a war. Therefore, they went back to their place of origin, Tujalj (Sacapulas and Canillá)), but only to pick up their families and set out again to settle a new community where they were once stationed to keep an eye on the aj K'ub'ul. (Note: This was confirmed by Antonio Rodríguez, from Sacapulas, who witnessed the contact his family had with Rabinal, San Miguel Chicaj and Salamá in the 1950s. They knew that their families were related and always brought Sacapulas produce into those municipalities.)

=== Pacific conquest by the Dominican friars ===
On his second visit to Guatemala, in 1537, friar Bartolomé de las Casas, O.P. wanted to employ his new method of conversion based on two principles: 1) to preach the Gospel to all men and treat them as equals, and 2) to assert that conversion must be voluntary and based on knowledge and understanding of the Faith. It was important for Las Casas that this method be tested without meddling from secular colonists, so he chose a territory in the heart of Guatemala where there were no previous colonies and where the natives were considered fierce and war-like. Because the land had not been possible to conquer by military means, the governor of Guatemala, Alonso de Maldonado, agreed to sign a contract promising that if the venture was successful he would not establish any new encomiendas in the area. Las Casas's group of friars established a Dominican presence in Rabinal, Sacapulas and Cobán, reaching as far as Chahal and including Cubulco. Through the efforts of Las Casas' missionaries the so-called "Land of War" came to be called "Verapaz", "True Peace". Las Casas's strategy was to teach Christian songs to merchant Indian Christians who then ventured into the area. In this way he was successful in converting several native chiefs, among them those of Atitlán and Chichicastenango, and in building several churches in the territory named Alta Verapaz. These congregated a group of Christian Indians in the location of what is now the town of Rabinal. In 1538 Las Casas was recalled from his mission by Bishop Francisco Marroquín who wanted him to go to Mexico and then on to Spain in order to seek more Dominicans to assist in the mission.

Cubulco's Catholic church was erected in the 1540 and was dedicated to Saint James.

=== Municipality ===
As of 1850, four years after it was elevated to a municipality, Cubulco had an estimated population of 4,000.

== Population ==
The local people are predominantly Achi Maya Native Americans who speak the Achi language.

== Climate ==
Cubulco has a tropical savanna climate (Köppen: Aw).

Climate data for Cubulco (1991–2020)
Month	Jan	Feb	Mar	Apr	May	Jun	Jul	Aug	Sep	Oct	Nov	Dec	Year
Record high °C (°F)	36.2 (97.2)	38.6 (101.5)	39.0 (102.2)	40.0 (104.0)	38.8 (101.8)	38.5 (101.3)	38.0 (100.4)	39.4 (102.9)	34.6 (94.3)	39.1 (102.4)	37.6 (99.7)	38.5 (101.3)	40.0 (104.0)
Mean daily maximum °C (°F)	28.3 (82.9)	30.4 (86.7)	32.3 (90.1)	33.6 (92.5)	32.5 (90.5)	30.8 (87.4)	30.2 (86.4)	30.5 (86.9)	30.2 (86.4)	28.9 (84.0)	27.8 (82.0)	28.1 (82.6)	30.3 (86.5)
Mean daily minimum °C (°F)	11.8 (53.2)	12.0 (53.6)	13.5 (56.3)	15.7 (60.3)	17.2 (63.0)	17.7 (63.9)	17.1 (62.8)	17.1 (62.8)	17.6 (63.7)	16.6 (61.9)	14.3 (57.7)	12.4 (54.3)	15.2 (59.4)
Record low °C (°F)	−8.1 (17.4)	0.3 (32.5)	0.2 (32.4)	7.0 (44.6)	7.0 (44.6)	7.5 (45.5)	7.6 (45.7)	6.3 (43.3)	4.6 (40.3)	7.6 (45.7)	0.8 (33.4)	1.0 (33.8)	−8.1 (17.4)
Average precipitation mm (inches)	4.5 (0.18)	3.7 (0.15)	11.4 (0.45)	59.7 (2.35)	166.1 (6.54)	219.2 (8.63)	144.2 (5.68)	179.9 (7.08)	200.0 (7.87)	127.2 (5.01)	37.4 (1.47)	10.5 (0.41)	1,163.8 (45.82)
Average precipitation days (≥ 1.0 mm)	1.3	1.0	2.0	5.0	10.8	17.3	14.3	15.5	17.3	13.0	4.8	2.5	104.8
Source: NOAA

== Geographic location ==
Cubulco is at the geographic center of Guatemala and is one of the most visited spots in the whole country.

== See also ==
- Guatemala
- Guatemala Civil War
- List of places in Guatemala

== Notes and references ==
=== Bibliography ===
- Anabitarte, Héctor (1991). "Grandes Personajes. Bartolomé de las Casas". Edición Colaborativa del 75 Aniversario (in Spanish). Labor. ISBN 84-335-7100-1.
- Chacón Gómez, Carmen Hevelia. Comercialización (producción de maíz) y proyecto producción de elote dulce; municipio de Cubulco, departamento de Baja Verapaz (PDF) (in Spanish). Guatemala: Facultad de Ciencias Económicas de la Universidad de San Carlos de Guatemala.
- Wagner, Henry Raup; Parish, Helen Rand (1967). The Life and Writings of Bartolomé de Las Casas. University of New Mexico Press.
