= Quichean languages =

Subgroup of Maya languages

Quichean
- Greater Quichean
- Geographic distribution: Mesoamerica
- Linguistic classification: Mayan: Eastern (Quichean–Mamean); Quichean
- Subdivisions: Quichean proper; Pokom; Kekchi; Uspantek; Sakapultek; Sipakapense

Language codes
- Glottolog: grea1276

The (Greater) Quichean languages are a branch of the Mayan family of Guatemala.

== Languages ==
- Qichean proper
  - Kaqchikel (Cakchiquel)
  - Tzʼutujil
  - Quiche–Achi: Kʼicheʼ (Quiché), Achiʼ
- Qʼeqchiʼ (Kekchi)
- Pokom: Poqomam, Poqomchiʼ
- Uspantek
- Sakapultek
- Sipakapense

Genealogy of Mayan languages.

See Mayan languages#Eastern branch for details.

== Lexical comparison ==
From Campbell (1999).

Lexical comparison of Quichean languages

| Gloss | Kaqchikel | Tzʼutujil | Kʼicheʼ | Poqomam | Uspantek | Qʼeqchiʼ |
|---|---|---|---|---|---|---|
| custard apple | pak | pak | pak | pak | pak | pak |
| snail | pur | pur | pur | pur | pur | pur |
| thick | pim | pim | pim | pim | pim | pim |
| to help | toʔ | toʔ | toʔ | toʔ | toʔ | toʔ |
| to pay | tox | tox | tox | tox | tox | tox |
| sweet | kiʔ | kiʔ | kiʔ | kiʔ | kiʔ | kiʔ |
| quern (metate) | kaːʔ | kaːʔ | kaːʔ | kaːʔ | kaːʔ | kaːʔ |
| parrot | kʼel | kʼel | kʼel | kʼel | kʼel | (kʼel) |
| our | qa- | qa- | qa- | qa- | qa- | qa- |
| neck | qul | qul | qul | — | qul | — |
| resin, pitch | qˈoːl | qˈol | qˈoːl | qˈoːl | qˈoːl | qˈoːl |
| yellow | qˈan | qˈan | qˈan | qˈan | qˈan | qˈan |
| tick | siːp | siːp | siːp | siːp | siːp | siːp |
| white | saq | saq | saq | saq | saq | saq |
| water gourd | tsuj | tsuj | tsuh | suh | tsuh | suh |
| good | uts | uts | uts | us | uts | us |
| thick | tsats | tsats | tsats | sas | tsats | sas |
| dog | tsʼiʔ | tsʼiʔ | tsʼiʔ | tsʼiʔ | tsʼiʔ | tsʼiʔ |
| tree, wood | čeːʔ | čeːʔ | čeːʔ | čeːʔ | čeːʔ | čeːʔ |
| lime | čuːn | čuːn | čuːn | čuːn | čuːn | čuːn |
| pineapple | čʼoːp | čʼoːp | čʼoːp | čʼoːp | čʼoːp | čʼoːp |
| hole, cave | xul | xul | xul | xul | xul | xul |
| person | winaq | winaq | winaq | winaq | winaq | kwinq |
| trousers | weːʃ | weːʃ | weːʃ | weːʃ | — | kweːʃ |
| genitals, shame | jaːx | jaːx | jaːx | jaːx | jaːx | jaːx |
| shade | muːx | muːx | muːx | muːx | mùːx | muːh |
| avocado | oːx | oːx | oːx | oːx | òːx | oːh |
| ashes | čaːx | čaːx | čaːx | čaːx | čàːx | čaːh |
| steambath | tuːx | tuːx | tuːx | tuːx | tùːx | tuːh |
| day, sun | qʼiːx | qʼiːx | qʼiːx | qʼiːx | qʼìːx | (-qʼiːh) |
| sky | kaːx | kaːx | kaːx | kaːx | kàːx | — |
| pine | čax | čax | čax | čax | čax | čax |
| flour | kʼax | kʼax | kʼax | kʼax | kʼax | kʼax |
| mask | kʼoːx | kʼoːx | kʼoːx | kʼoːx | kʼoːx | kʼoːx |
| gopher | ɓaːh | ɓaːj | ɓaːj | wʼaːh | ɓaːh | ɓaːh |
| bone | ɓaːq | ɓaːq | ɓaːq | wʼaːq | ɓaq | ɓaq |
| road | ɓeːj | ɓeːh | ɓeːh | wʼeːh | ɓeːh | ɓeːh |
| smoke | siɓ | siɓ | siɓ | simʼ | siɓ | siɓ |
| rain | xaɓ | xaɓ | xaɓ | xamʼ | xaɓ | haɓ |
| canoe, trough | xukuːʔ | xukuːʔ | xukuːɓ | xukuːmʼ | xukuːɓ | xukuːɓ |
| night | aːqʼaʔ | aːqʼaʔ | aːqʼaʃ | aːqʼamʼ | aːqʼaɓ | (aːqʼɓ) |
| ear of corn | xal | xal | xal | xal | xal | hal |
| tail | xeːj | xeːj | xeːh | xeːh | xeːh | heːh |
| mouse, rat | čʼoːj | čʼoːj | čʼoːh | čʼoːh | čʼoːh | čʼoːh |
| flea | kʼjaq | kʼjaq | kʼjaq | kʼaq | kʼaq | kʼaq |
| red | kjaq | kjaq | kjaq | kaq | kaq | kaq |
| guava | (i)kjaqʼ | (i)kjaqʼ | kjaqʼ | kaqʼ | — | — |
| fingernail | iʃkʼjaq | ʃkʼjaq | iʃkʼjaq | iʃkʼaq | iʃkʼaq | — |
| ear | ʃikin | ʃikin | ʃikin | ʃikin | ʃikin | (ʃikn) |
| woman | iʃoq | iʃoq | iʃoq | iʃoq | — | iʃq |
| big (plural) | nimaq | nimaq | nimaq | nimaq | nimaq | ninq |
| ant | sanik | sanik | sanik | (sanik) | sanik | sank |
| cloth, kerchief | suʔt | suʔt | suʔt | suʔt | sùːtʼ | (suʔut) |
| blouse | poʔt | poʔt | poʔt | poʔt | pòːtʼ | poʔot |
| corncob | piʔq | piʔq | piʔq | piʔq | pìːqʼ | — |
| grandmother | atiʔt | atiʔt | atiʔt | atiʔt | atìːtʼ | atiʔt |
| bitter | kʼaj | kʼaj | kʼah | kʼah | kʼah | kʼah |
| to sell | kʼaj | kʼaj | kʼaj | kʼaj | kʼaj | kʼaj |
| blind (dark) | moːj | moːj | moːj | moːj | moːj | moːj |
| to wash | čʼax | čʼax | čʼax | — | čʼax | čʼax |
| to hit | čʼaj | čʼaj | čʼaj | čʼaj | — | — |

== See also ==
- Classical Kʼicheʼ
