= Rabinal Achí =

Maya theatrical play

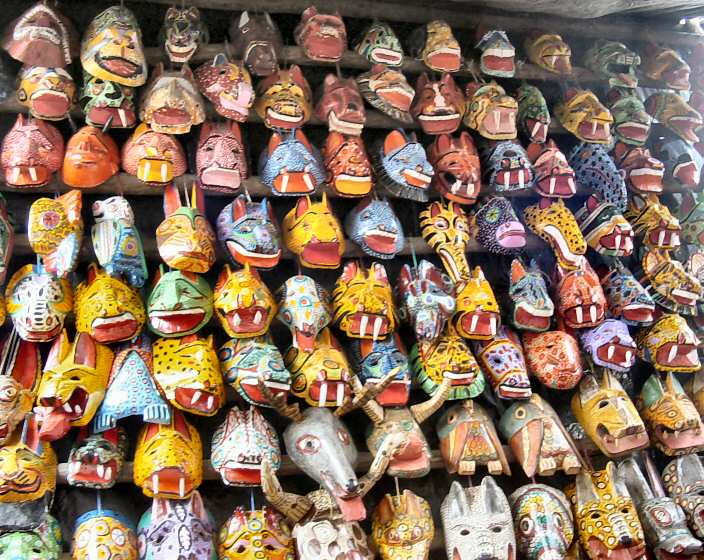
Guatemalan masks on display. The Rabinal Achi depends on the use of such masks in all performances.

The Rabinal Achí is a Maya theatrical play written in the Kʼicheʼ language and performed annually in Rabinal, Baja Verapaz, Guatemala. Its original name is Xajoj Tun, meaning "Dance of the Tun" instrument also known as wooden drum. This is one of the few surviving performance pieces from before colonization. It takes place every year on January 25 and involves the entire community of Rabinal. A combination of movement, song, and instrumentation meld the piece together. This performance has been a part of Rabinal history for centuries, and continues to be a part of the culture today. The story of the Rabinal Achí centers on a historical feud between Rabinal and Kʼicheʼ, two neighboring cities. Colorful costumes and wooden masks are used to differentiate the characters as they play out their roles in the song-dance-drama.

== Origins ==
The Rabinal Achí is a Maya song-dance-drama from the fifteenth century that uses vibrant costumes and wooden masks to tell the story of the community and its history through myths of origin while also addressing popular and political subjects concerning the inhabitants of the region of Rabinal, expressed through masked dance, theatre, and music. The instrumentation used is a wooden slit-drum and two trumpets or shawms. Throughout its history, various instruments have been used to create various other effects such as gourds for percussion. The Rabinal Achí has been around since the 1600s, and is traditionally performed on 25 January to honor Saint Paul, the patron saint of Rabinal.

=== Early recording ===
Though Rabinal Achí has been around since the 16th century, it was not formally recorded until much later. The original narrative is by an anonymous author, but Charles-Étienne Brasseur de Bourbourg, a French clergyman, translated the original text into French from an Achi narration that the cofrade Bartolo Sis gave him in 1856, though he would not publish this text for ten more years. Bartolo Sis had transcribed the dialogue of the performance six years before. Many texts were lost from the pre-Columbian era, after the land was conquered and the new Spanish culture was imposed, but this text still remains.

== Performance ==
The story is told through song and dance by a cast of characters. These characters stand as representations for various Maya communities and villages, and the narrative covers a variety of topics such as Maya nobility and diplomacy, battles between various cities, and the feud that took place between the Rabinaleb and Kʼicheʼ people.

=== Plot ===
The plot of the Rabinal Achí is that of a real conflict that took place between the Rabinaleb and the Kʼicheʼ people. The main action of the play explains that four cities were destroyed by Kʼicheʼ Achí, the Prince of Kʼicheʼ, who then tries to kidnap the children of Rabinaleb. Because it is such a serious crime, Kʼicheʼ is caught, at which time Rabinaleb reminds Kʼicheʼ of all of his feats, both bad and good. Kʼicheʼ is tried, and it is ultimately decided that he should be sacrificed. He reminisces about his native land, but submits to being executed, bringing justice back to Rabinal.

=== Characters ===
- The Rabinal Achí, prince of Rabinal
- The Kʼiche Achí, prince of the Kʼicheʼ.
- The king of Rabinalebʼ
- JobʼToj
- Achij Mun (his servant)
- Ixoq Mun, who has both male and female traits
- The Green-Feathered Mother
- Uchuch Qʼuqʼ
- Uchuch Raxon
- Thirteen eagles and jaguars, warriors of the fortress of Kajyubʼ, the principal town in Rabinal.

While the cast is large, only five of these characters speak. The movement for the piece is primarily cyclical, which represents the cycle of life and death that Kʼicheʼ Achí faces during the drama. The dancers move in a circle while the two princes face off against each other in the middle. The dialogue is likewise repetitive to perpetuate this notion. The performers are called out into the playing area by the beating of the drum. This drum is played by a community member who has been trained on how to play the sacred drum from a young age.

== Tradition and present day Rabinal Achí ==
The Rabinal Achí is still performed today every year on January 25 in Rabinal. The cofradías, local brotherhoods, of which Bartolo Sis was part, are in charge of this event. This is a way for the community to remain in touch with their ancestry and to celebrate.

For the Achis of modern-day Rabinal, the Rabinal Achí continues to be performed once a year during the celebration of Saint Paul.

The Rabinal Achí was performed in 1955 by the Dirección General de Bellas Artes. Performers had to abstain from sexual acts for the thirty days prior to and after the performance. They also underwent twenty days of spiritual preparation and were required to request permission from the Mayan gods in order to perform by dancing and offering gifts. For this production, the jaguars and eagles were each represented by one performer as opposed to the usual thirteen.

In 2005, the dance drama from Rabinal was declared one of the Masterpieces of the Oral and Intangible Heritage of Humanity by UNESCO.
