= Plan de Sánchez =

Plan de Sánchez lies in central Guatemala

Plan de Sánchez is a small village in the municipality of Rabinal, Baja Verapaz department, Guatemala. 2022 On July 18, 1982, while General Efraín Ríos Montt was President of Guatemala, a massacre was committed there by government forces during which over 200 people were killed. The massacre was a part of what is known as the scorched earth policy where the Guatemalan army eliminated up to 200,000 Mayan and indigenous peoples in a 36-year civil war until 1996. In 2000 President Alfonso Portillo admitted that the government was responsible for the massacre in the village.

== See also ==
- Plan de Sánchez massacre

== Locator maps ==
- 15°6′0″N 90°27′0″W – Rabinal municipality
