= Achi language =

Mayan language of Guatemala

Achi
- Achiʼ
- Pronunciation: [at͡ʃiʔ]
- Native to: Guatemala
- Region: Baja Verapaz
- Ethnicity: 161,000 Achi (2019 census)
- Native speakers: 120,000 (2019 census)
- Language family: Mayan: Quichean–Mamean; Greater Quichean; Quichean; Quiché–Achi; Achi
- Dialects: Rabinal; Cubulco

Official status
- Recognised minority language in: Guatemala
- Regulated by: Academia de Lenguas Mayas de Guatemala

Language codes
- ISO 639-3: acr
- Glottolog: achi1256
- ELP: Achi'
- Achi is classified as Vulnerable by the UNESCO Atlas of the World's Languages in Danger.

Achi (Achí in Spanish) is a Mayan language very closely related to Kʼicheʼ (Quiché in the older orthography). It is spoken by the Achi people, primarily in the department of Baja Verapaz in Guatemala.

There are two Achi dialects. Rabinal Achi is spoken in the Rabinal area, and Cubulco Achi is spoken in the Cubulco area west of Rabinal.

One of the masterpieces of precolumbian literature is the Rabinal Achí, a theatrical play written in the Achi language.

== Phonology ==
The tables present the consonant and vowel phonemes of Achi. On the left is the spelling in use.

=== Consonants ===
		Labial	Alveolar		Post-alv./ Palatal	Velar	Uvular	Pharyn- geal	Glottal
Nasal		m [m]	n [n]						
Plosive/ Affricate	voiceless	p [p]	t [t]	tz [ts]	ch [tʃ]	k [k]	q [q]		’ [ʔ]
Plosive/ Affricate	ejective		tʼ [tʼ]	tzʼ [tsʼ]	chʼ [tʃʼ]	kʼ [kʼ]			
Plosive/ Affricate	implosive	bʼ [ɓ]							
Fricative			s [s]		x [ʃ]		j [χ]	qʼ [ʕ]	
Trill			r [r]						
Approximant		w [w]	l [l]		y [j]				

- Voiceless plosives can have aspirated allophones [pʰ tʰ kʰ qʰ], either when preceding a consonant or in word-final position.
- The uvular fricative /χ/ can also be heard as velar [x] in some environments.
- /n/ assimilates to a velar nasal [ŋ] when preceding a velar consonant.
- Sonorants /l r j/ when preceding a voiceless consonant or in word-final position become devoiced [l̥ r̥ j̊].

=== Vowels ===
	Front	Central	Back
Close	i [i] ii [iː]		u [u] uu [uː]
Mid	e [e] ee [eː]		o [o] oo [oː]
Open		a [a] aa [aː]	
