= International Centre for Human Rights Research =

Guatemalan non-governmental organization

The International Centre for Human Rights Research or CIIDH (Spanish: Centro Internacional para Investigaciones en Derechos Humanos) is a Guatemalan non-governmental organization.

The organization was founded in 1993, in the final years of the country's 36-year-long Civil War, with the aim of promoting and defending human rights and publishing information of interest in that field. However, its original purpose was much more activist in nature. Housing a project that collected testimonies from witnesses of human rights violations that occurred during the country's civil war, its original goal was to use this information and their authors to support legal attacks against Guatemalan Army officers who were suspected of perpetrating war crimes. Created and directed by Paul Yamauchi from 1993 to June 1996, the CIIDH and its project were slowly taken over by URNG activists who while working with their Director, gradually sabotaged the project activities and terminated its original mission, all in accordance with the URNG's signed peace accords with the Guatemalan Army, which provided mutual amnesty to both parties.
