= Santa Cruz El Chol =

- Location en Guatemala
- Coordinates: 14°57′43″N 90°29′14″W
- Country: Guatemala
- Department: Baja Verapaz

Government
  - Mayor: Adolfo Mayén (FCN-Nación)

Area
  - Total: 140 km^{2} (54 sq mi)
- Elevation: 1,008 m (3,307 ft)

Population (2002)
  - Total: 8,460
- Climate: BSh

Santa Cruz El Chol (Spanish pronunciation: [ˈsanta ˈkɾus el tʃol]) is a municipality in the Baja Verapaz department of Guatemala. It is situated at 1008 m above sea level and contains about 8817 people. It covers a terrain of 140 km² and its annual festival is held from December 6-December 8.

== History ==
=== First settlers ===
Originally, the region was named "Santa Cruz Belén de los Indios Choles" (Bethlehem Holy Cross of the Chole Indians), and it was settled in 1603 (according to the friar Joseph H. Sotomayor), which makes it one of the oldest Spanish towns in Guatemala.

=== 18th century ===
In the early 1710s, friar and chronicler Francisco Ximénez, O.P. wrote in the fifth volume of what is known as Historia de la Providencia de San Vicente de Chiapas y Guatemala (History of the San Vicente de Chiapas and Guatemala Providence), that by order of Real Audiencia President, Governor and Captain General of the Kingdom of Guatemala, Jacinto de Barrios Leal, natives from Cahabón went into the El Chol mountain in 1689 -later names Chuacús and Chama mountains-, in order to expel the infidel and rebellious chole natives from there, and then be able to establish the town of Santa Cruz ("Holy Cross"). Verapaz Mayor, Joseph Calvo de Lara, founded the town in Urram valley, next to Rabinal mountain on a location that the Indians called "San Clemente and San Diego", where there was a cross, and therefore it was named "Santa Cruz". Friar José Ángel Zenoyo, O.P. took over the town in 1690 and helped the natives in all he could, building houses and giving them clothing.

=== 21st century ===
In the 21st century there are very few natives that speak achí, k'akchiquel, or k'iche'- even though in the 18th century there were much more, and some of them even spoke the "chol lacandon" language, also known as "choolí" or "kholií".

== Traditions ==
Among this municipality representative folkloric dances the main ones are the dances of "El Venado" ("The Deer", "Los Animales" ("The Animals") and "El Costeño" ("The man from the coast"). During Holy Week and the annual festival, one can see religious processions and colorful died-sawdust carpets that are made for the processions.

=== Annual festival ===
Santa Cruz El Chol annual festival takes places on 8 December in honor of the municipality saint patron: Holy Virgin of the Immaculate Conception. The festival is famous for its commercial activities, sports events, cultural, social and religious festivities and the traditional processions and "Romería", activity in which people rides horses for three days from the Eastern side of Guatemala to present the town's Catholic Church with gifts, prayers and special songs.

== Climate ==
Santa Cruz El Chol has a hot semi-arid climate (Köppen: BSh).

Climate data for Santa Cruz El Chol
| Month | Jan | Feb | Mar | Apr | May | Jun | Jul | Aug | Sep | Oct | Nov | Dec | Year |
|---|---|---|---|---|---|---|---|---|---|---|---|---|---|
| Mean daily maximum °C (°F) | 26.9 (80.4) | 28.0 (82.4) | 29.6 (85.3) | 30.0 (86.0) | 29.5 (85.1) | 28.1 (82.6) | 27.8 (82.0) | 28.1 (82.6) | 27.7 (81.9) | 27.2 (81.0) | 27.1 (80.8) | 26.9 (80.4) | 28.1 (82.5) |
| Daily mean °C (°F) | 20.2 (68.4) | 20.9 (69.6) | 22.4 (72.3) | 23.3 (73.9) | 23.4 (74.1) | 23.0 (73.4) | 22.6 (72.7) | 22.7 (72.9) | 22.4 (72.3) | 21.8 (71.2) | 21.0 (69.8) | 20.1 (68.2) | 22.0 (71.6) |
| Mean daily minimum °C (°F) | 13.5 (56.3) | 13.9 (57.0) | 15.3 (59.5) | 16.7 (62.1) | 17.4 (63.3) | 17.9 (64.2) | 17.5 (63.5) | 17.3 (63.1) | 17.1 (62.8) | 16.5 (61.7) | 14.9 (58.8) | 13.4 (56.1) | 16.0 (60.7) |
| Average precipitation mm (inches) | 1 (0.0) | 3 (0.1) | 6 (0.2) | 21 (0.8) | 79 (3.1) | 180 (7.1) | 118 (4.6) | 74 (2.9) | 142 (5.6) | 74 (2.9) | 15 (0.6) | 2 (0.1) | 715 (28) |
Source: Climate-Data.org

== Geographic location ==
El Chol is located 52 km East of Salamá, Baja Verapaz Department capital city.

== See also ==
- Baja Verapaz Department
- Guatemala
- Order of Preachers

== Notes and references ==
=== Bibliography ===
- Abac; Manuel T., Evaristo; Bertrán, Pedro (1897). "Los indios que se redimen: Cartas de estudiantes indígenas aventajados". La Ilustración Guatemalteca (in Spanish). I (11). Guatemala.
- Gonzáles de Cosio, Domingo (n.d.). Libro de Bautismo de Santo Domingo de Guzmán (in Spanish). El Chol, Guatemala.
- Municipalidad de Santa Cruz El Chol (n.d.). "Descripción del municipio". Municipalidad de Santa Cruz El Chol (in Spanish). Guatemala. Archived from the original on 17 April 2015.
- SEGEPLAN (n.d.). "Municipios de Alta Verapaz, Guatemala". Secretaría General de Planificación y Programación de la Presidencia de la República (in Spanish). Guatemala. Archived from the original on 30 June 2015.
- Ximénez, Francisco (1999) [1715?]. Sáenz de Santa María, Carmelo (ed.). Historia de la provincia de San Vicente de Chiapa y Guatemala de la orden de predicadores (in Spanish). México: Consejo Estatal para la Cultura y las Artes de Chiapas.
