= Sipakapense people =

Sipakapense
Total population
- 17,373

Regions with significant populations

Languages
- Sipakapense, Spanish

Religion
- Catholic, Evangelicalist, Maya religion

The Sipakapense are one of the Maya peoples in Guatemala. They speak the Mayan Sipakapense language.
