= Granados, Baja Verapaz =

Granados
- Municipality of Guatemala
- Location in Guatemala
- Coordinates: 14°54′50″N 90°31′24″W
- Country: Guatemala
- Department: Baja Verapaz

Government
  - Mayor (2016-2020): Byron Ronaldo Alvarado

Population (1994)
  - Total: 10,096
- Climate: Aw

Granados is a municipality in the Baja Verapaz department of Guatemala. It was named after former Guatemalan president Miguel García Granados in 1893.

== General information ==
Granados is located at the base of the Chuacus Mountains, in the river Motagua gorge, and is the farthest municipality from Baja Verapaz capital, Salamá It was named after former president general Miguel García Granados, leader of the Liberal Revolution in 1871, by a decree signed on 13 January 1893, by president general José María Reina Barrios.

It has a surface of approximately 248 km2 and is famous in the region for its Rosa de Jamaica and Tamarindo beverages.

== Population ==
Granados has a population of 10,096 according to the 1994 Census of the Statistics National Institute, with 10% being natives and the rest ladinos.

== Main religious celebrations ==
Granados celebrated its main Catholic celebration on 29 June, in honor of its former saint patron, Saint Peter, from 1960 to 2000, but since the settlement of the Granados' Black Christ, the latter became its official saint patron, and Granados started celebration on 15 January. However, starting in 2015 Granados decided to have two celebrations: one in June in honor of Saint Peter, saint patron of the town of Granandos and another on January, in honor of the Black Christ of Granados, saint patron of the municipality.

== Climate ==
Granados has a tropical savanna climate (Köppen: Aw).

Climate data for Granados
Month	Jan	Feb	Mar	Apr	May	Jun	Jul	Aug	Sep	Oct	Nov	Dec	Year
Mean daily maximum °C (°F)	27.7 (81.9)	28.7 (83.7)	30.1 (86.2)	30.6 (87.1)	29.9 (85.8)	28.5 (83.3)	28.4 (83.1)	28.6 (83.5)	28.0 (82.4)	27.6 (81.7)	27.6 (81.7)	27.5 (81.5)	28.6 (83.5)
Daily mean °C (°F)	21.0 (69.8)	21.8 (71.2)	23.1 (73.6)	24.1 (75.4)	24.0 (75.2)	23.5 (74.3)	23.3 (73.9)	23.2 (73.8)	22.8 (73.0)	22.3 (72.1)	21.5 (70.7)	20.8 (69.4)	22.6 (72.7)
Mean daily minimum °C (°F)	14.3 (57.7)	14.9 (58.8)	16.2 (61.2)	17.6 (63.7)	18.1 (64.6)	18.5 (65.3)	18.2 (64.8)	17.9 (64.2)	17.7 (63.9)	17.1 (62.8)	15.5 (59.9)	20.8 (69.4)	17.2 (63.0)
Average precipitation mm (inches)	1 (0.0)	3 (0.1)	6 (0.2)	25 (1.0)	91 (3.6)	196 (7.7)	125 (4.9)	85 (3.3)	158 (6.2)	86 (3.4)	15 (0.6)	2 (0.1)	793 (31.1)
Source: Climate-Data.org

== Geographic location ==
Granados is located in the south of Baja Verapaz Department, 35 miles away from Guatemala City.

== See also ==
- Baja Verapaz
- Miguel García Granados
- List of places in Guatemala

== Notes and references ==
=== Bibliography ===
- Escalante Herrera, Marco Antonio (n.d.). "Municipios de Guatemala: Granados, Baja Verapaz" (in Spanish). Guatemala.
- Monografías (n.d.). "Granados". Monografías (in Spanish). Archived from the original on 22 November 2006.
- SEGEPLAN (n.d.). "Municipios de Baja Verapaz, Guatemala". Secretaría de Planificación y Programación de la Presidencia (in Spanish). Guatemala. Archived from the original on 30 June 2015.
