= Bull horn acacia =

Bull horn acacia is a common name for several plants in Vachellia with large thorns resembling a bull's horns:

- Vachellia collinsii, native to Central America and parts of Africa
- Vachellia cornigera, native to Mexico and Central America
- Vachellia sphaerocephala, endemic to Mexico
