= Palo amarillo =

Palo amarillo is a common name of Spanish origin for several plants and may refer to:

- Berberis gracilis, native to Mexico
- Bocconia frutescens
- Esenbeckia flava
- Euphorbia elastica
- Terminalia australis, native to South America
