= San Jerónimo, Baja Verapaz =

San Jerónimo
- Municipality
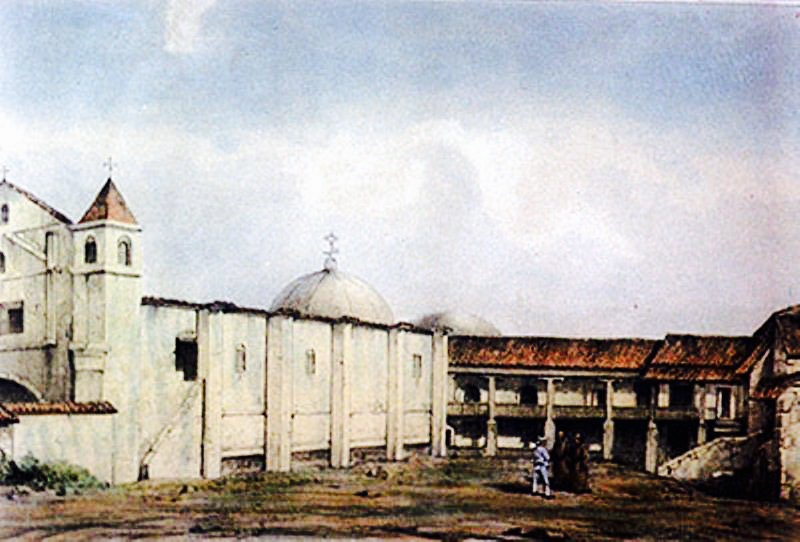
- Hacienda and church of the Order of Preachers in San Jerónimco in 1844. Drawing by M. Van Lockhoet.

- Location in Guatemala
- Coordinates: 15°03′40″N 90°14′25″W
- Country: Guatemala
- Department: Baja Verapaz

Government
  - Mayor: Moisés Canahuí (PP)

Area
  - Municipality: 275 km^{2} (106 sq mi)

Population (2018 census)
  - Municipality: 25,459
  - Density: 92.6/km^{2} (240/sq mi)
  - Urban: 10,530
- Climate: Aw

San Jerónimo (Spanish pronunciation: [saŋ xeˈɾonimo]) is a town and municipality in the Baja Verapaz department of Guatemala. The municipality is situated at 940 metres above sea level and has a population of 25,459 (2018 census). It covers an area of 275 km^{2}. The annual festival is September 28 – September 30.

The predominant language is Spanish. There is a party and main fair held from 27 to 30 September each year, in honor of the patron Saint Jerome.

== History ==
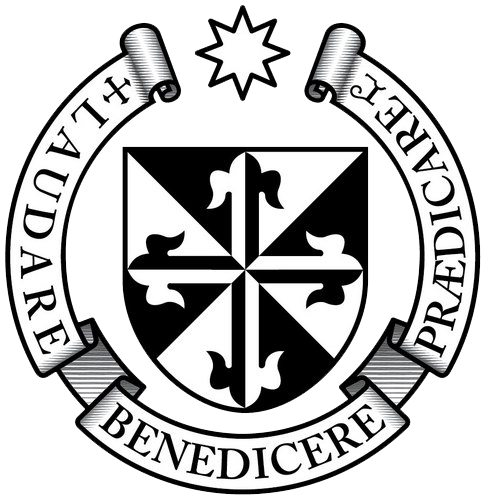
The Order of Preachers settled the Salamá doctrine in the 1550s.

After the conquest of the Verapaces by the Spanish, the Hacienda de San Jerónimo was created, in the care of Dominican priests; it is believed that friars Luis Cancer, Bartolomé de las Casas, Luis de Ladrada and Pedro Angulo, were the first newcomers to the Valley of San Jerónimo, as Friar Luis Cancer ordered the construction of the Church in the year 1537 and, in the same year in October, took the news to the capital of the Kingdom of Guatemala.

The Hacienda was founded between the years 1540 and 1550. The first sugar plantation in Central America was founded here in 1601 by Rafael Lujan, becoming the most important heritage of the Spanish Kingdom in Central America for its production of sugar, cochineal, grapes, wine and pot liquor ("licores de olla"); however, the friar preferred the grapes than the sugar cane plantations.

Friar Francisco Callejos, who was the manager of the Hacienda, constructed a Roman-style aqueduct to bring water to the people. The Dominican coat of arms can be found in the ruins of the aqueduct, which still remain. It is located in the town of San Jerónimo, and can be more easily observed along the road to the San Lorenzo farm.

=== British settlement ===
In early 1830s, from the top of the south mountains one can see the dry valley of Salamá, with its white-wall houses. The road was in good condition, but the descent from the mountains to the creek that surrounded the valley was long and painful. Along the creek's shore there were numerous trees and vegetation, which serve a rest area for the travelers before continuing with the trip under the sun. Salamá was a small town crossed by a crystalline creek and had a central square with palms in the middle of the valle. Close to the town was the old convent, which was then considered as the largest and most valuable property of the country, and which was sold in 1829 to Marshall Bennett, Francisco Morazán's commercial agent for the fine wood business in the region. (Note: Historian Woodward - who researched the life of General Captain Rafael Carrera - mentions that the hacienda belonged to the Order of St Jerome, hence its name; however, other authors tell that it belonged to the Order of Preachers.) Bennett called it "Hacienda de San Jerónimo", and soon had numerous sugar and coffee plantations, which were possible thanks to the upgrades of the old irrigation system; Bennett replaced the friars' vines with sugar cane plantations and the wine was replaced by a rum called "Puro de San Gerónimo", which became famous across the country.

The native and black settlers of Salamá were used to the monastery discipline, which Bennett used to his own benefit and his first few years were very profitable. But later on, there were bitter disputes among his descendants and, with the friars gone, soon there were tense disagreements between the hacienda owners and the town's people.

=== Hacienda de San Jerónimo crisis ===
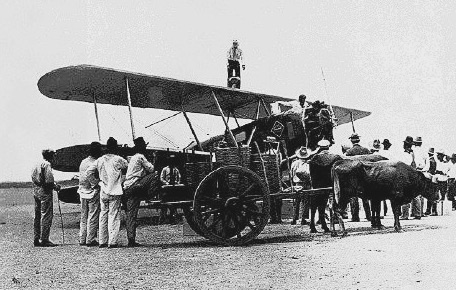
Airplane being fueled on San Jerónimo aviation field in 1928. This airport served the Baja Verapaz Department region.

But in 1890 the crisis deepened: natives and mestizos had invaded the outskirts of the hacienda and had been stealing wood and farming products, set several fields on fire, damaged the irrigation system and mutilated livestock. Eventually, an angry mob set the sugar mill on fire attacked the hacienda foreman. When things reached this point, the owners contacted the British Ambassador, who -after negotiation with the liberal government, who was well aware that its own officers had supported and promoted the attack- agreed to expel the invaders and pay a settlement for fourteen thousand Guatemalan pesos. Besides, it was agreed to sell a portion of the hacienda to settle a town and give it the old church.

== Tourism ==
The main tourist attraction in the municipality is "El Trapiche" Museum, which contains and exhibition of the historical facts that happened both in the doctrine and the Hacienda of San Jerónimo. Other archeological sites can be found in: El Portón, Laguna, Los Mangales, Matanzas, Pueblo Viejo, Sibabaj, Xubalbal, Zacualpa and La Presa.

== Climate ==
San Jerónimo has a tropical savanna climate (Köppen: Aw).

Climate data for San Jerónimo, Baja Verapaz (1991–2020)
Month	Jan	Feb	Mar	Apr	May	Jun	Jul	Aug	Sep	Oct	Nov	Dec	Year
Record high °C (°F)	35.0 (95.0)	36.5 (97.7)	37.0 (98.6)	37.7 (99.9)	37.0 (98.6)	36.5 (97.7)	33.2 (91.8)	34.5 (94.1)	34.1 (93.4)	32.4 (90.3)	33.0 (91.4)	33.6 (92.5)	37.7 (99.9)
Mean daily maximum °C (°F)	27.1 (80.8)	28.8 (83.8)	30.4 (86.7)	31.7 (89.1)	31.2 (88.2)	29.8 (85.6)	29.1 (84.4)	29.6 (85.3)	29.5 (85.1)	28.4 (83.1)	27.1 (80.8)	27.0 (80.6)	29.1 (84.4)
Daily mean °C (°F)	21.1 (70.0)	22.1 (71.8)	23.0 (73.4)	24.3 (75.7)	24.4 (75.9)	23.7 (74.7)	23.3 (73.9)	23.4 (74.1)	23.4 (74.1)	22.9 (73.2)	21.7 (71.1)	21.0 (69.8)	22.9 (73.2)
Mean daily minimum °C (°F)	12.6 (54.7)	13.1 (55.6)	14.2 (57.6)	16.1 (61.0)	17.4 (63.3)	17.7 (63.9)	16.7 (62.1)	16.7 (62.1)	17.2 (63.0)	16.3 (61.3)	14.5 (58.1)	13.2 (55.8)	15.5 (59.9)
Record low °C (°F)	1.7 (35.1)	5.9 (42.6)	3.5 (38.3)	7.4 (45.3)	8.7 (47.7)	8.9 (48.0)	2.9 (37.2)	10.7 (51.3)	10.6 (51.1)	7.4 (45.3)	5.0 (41.0)	4.6 (40.3)	1.7 (35.1)
Average precipitation mm (inches)	6.6 (0.26)	4.3 (0.17)	16.4 (0.65)	38.7 (1.52)	91.8 (3.61)	189.6 (7.46)	134.0 (5.28)	156.7 (6.17)	186.5 (7.34)	118.6 (4.67)	36.4 (1.43)	12.8 (0.50)	992.4 (39.07)
Average precipitation days (≥ 1.0 mm)	2.1	1.3	2.8	3.6	7.4	15.9	13.5	13.7	16.1	12.2	5.6	3.2	97.4
Source: NOAA

== Geographic location ==
San Jerónimo borders only two municipalities: Salamá in Baja Verapaz Department and Morazán in El Progreso Department:

== See also ==
- Francisco Morazán
- List of places in Guatemala
- Order of Preachers

== Notes and references ==
=== Bibliography ===
- Belaubre, Christopohe (2001). "Poder y redes sociales en Centroamérica: el caso de la Orden de los Dominicos (1757-1829)" (PDF). Mesoamérica (in Spanish). 41.
- González Davison, Fernando (2008). La montaña infinita; Carrera, caudillo de Guatemala (in Spanish). Guatemala: Artemis y Edinter. ISBN 978-84-89452-81-7.
- Marroquín Rojas, Clemente (1971). Francisco Morazán y Rafael Carrera (in Spanish). Guatemala: Piedrasanta.
- Martínez Peláez, Severo (1990). La patria del criollo; ensayo de interpretación de la realidad colonial guatemalteca (in Spanish). México: Ediciones en Marcha.
- Maudslay, Alfred Percival; Maudslay, Anne Cary (1899). A glimpse at Guatemala, and some notes on the ancient monuments of Central America (PDF). London: John Murray.
- Morazán, Francisco (1942) [1842]. Testamento y memorias (in Spanish). Honduras: Talleres tipográficos nacionales. p. 60. "Testamento y memorias del general Francisco Morazán: discursos y artículos relativos al héroe. Publicación conmemorativa del primer centenario de su muerte"
- SEGEPLAN (n.d.). "Municipios de Baja Verapaz, Guatemala". Secretaría General de Planificación y Programación de la Presidencia de la República (in Spanish). Guatemala. Archived from the original on 29 June 2015.
- Stephens, John Lloyd; Catherwood, Frederick (1854). Incidents of travel in Central America, Chiapas, and Yucatan. London, England: Arthur Hall, Virtue and Co.
- Woodward, Ralph Lee Jr. (2002). "Rafael Carrera y la creación de la República de Guatemala, 1821–1871". Serie monográfica (in Spanish) (12). CIRMA y Plumsock Mesoamerican Studies. ISBN 0-910443-19-X. Archived from the original on 2019-03-01.
- — (1993). Rafael Carrera and the Emergence of the Republic of Guatemala, 1821-1871 (Online edition). Athens, Georgia: University of Georgia Press.
