= San Miguel Chicaj =

- Municipality
- Location in Guatemala
- Coordinates: 15°05′36″N 90°23′46″W
- Country: Guatemala
- Department: Baja Verapaz

Government
  - Mayor: Edgar Adán Ixtecoc (LIDER)

Area
  - Municipality: 280 km^{2} (110 sq mi)

Population (2018 census)
  - Municipality: 33,121
  - Density: 120/km^{2} (310/sq mi)
  - Urban: 7,609
- Climate: Aw

San Miguel Chicaj (Spanish pronunciation: [ˈsam miˈɣel tʃiˈkax]) is a town and municipality in the Baja Verapaz department of Guatemala. San Miguel Chicaj has an area of 280 Km², which makes one of the largest municipality of Baja Verapaz Department. It has a population of 33,131 (2018 census), mostly of achí background.

== History ==
According to an old local legend, the name "San Miguel Chicaj" came from the time that Saint Michael Archangel descended from Heaven and landed on the region.

On the Municipality of Salamá minutes, San Miguel Chicaj was founded on 23 October 1803 and raised to fourth category municipality in 1877, by the government of general Justo Rufino Barrios.

== Commercial activities ==
San Miguel Chijal is a farming community; its main produces are corn, beans and sugar cane, while its people also works with chickens and livestock, producing eggs, meat and several dairy products.

== Climate ==
San Miguel Chicaj has a tropical savanna climate (Köppen: Aw).

Climate data for San Miguel Chicaj
Month	Jan	Feb	Mar	Apr	May	Jun	Jul	Aug	Sep	Oct	Nov	Dec	Year
Mean daily maximum °C (°F)	27.1 (80.8)	28.5 (83.3)	30.1 (86.2)	30.8 (87.4)	30.0 (86.0)	28.6 (83.5)	28.2 (82.8)	28.6 (83.5)	28.3 (82.9)	27.9 (82.2)	27.4 (81.3)	27.3 (81.1)	28.6 (83.4)
Daily mean °C (°F)	20.4 (68.7)	21.4 (70.5)	23.0 (73.4)	24.1 (75.4)	23.9 (75.0)	23.6 (74.5)	23.1 (73.6)	23.1 (73.6)	22.9 (73.2)	22.5 (72.5)	21.3 (70.3)	20.6 (69.1)	22.5 (72.5)
Mean daily minimum °C (°F)	13.7 (56.7)	14.3 (57.7)	15.9 (60.6)	17.4 (63.3)	17.9 (64.2)	18.6 (65.5)	18.0 (64.4)	17.7 (63.9)	17.6 (63.7)	17.1 (62.8)	15.3 (59.5)	14.0 (57.2)	16.5 (61.6)
Average precipitation mm (inches)	11 (0.4)	11 (0.4)	13 (0.5)	27 (1.1)	87 (3.4)	196 (7.7)	138 (5.4)	85 (3.3)	153 (6.0)	96 (3.8)	35 (1.4)	12 (0.5)	864 (33.9)
Source: Climate-Data.org

== See also ==
- Baja Verapaz
- Guatemala
- Salamá

== Notes and references ==
=== Bibliography ===
- Blog de San Miguel Chicaj (2010). "San Miguel Chicaj". Blog de San Miguelo Chicaj (in Spanish). Guatemala. Archived from the original on 29 May 2014.
- Escalante Herrera, Marco Antonio (n.d.). "San Miguel Chicaj" (in Spanish). Archived from the original on 11 September 2014.
- Font, Mariana (2004). "Baja Verapaz". El rincón del vago (in Spanish). Archived from the original on 27 September 2004.
- SEGEPLAN (n.d.). "Municipios de Baja Verapaz, Guatemala". Secretaría General de Planificación y Programación de la Presidencia de la República (in Spanish). Guatemala. Archived from the original on 29 June 2015.
