= Sipakapa language =

Mayan language spoken in western Guatemala

Sipakapense
- Sipacapeño
- Ri Qyolb’al
- Native to: Sipacapa, San Marcos, Guatemala
- Region: Sipacapa
- Ethnicity: 17,400 Sipakapense (2019 census)
- Native speakers: 4,200 (2019 census)
- Language family: Mayan: Quichean–Mamean; Greater Quichean; Sipakapense

Official status
- Regulated by: Academia de Lenguas Mayas de Guatemala

Language codes
- ISO 639-3: qum
- Glottolog: sipa1247
- ELP: Sipakapa

Sipakapense is a Mayan language, closely related to Kʼicheʼ spoken natively within indigenous Sipakapense communities in Western Guatemala. It is primarily based in the municipality of Sipacapa in the department of San Marcos.

== Phonology ==
=== Consonants ===
		Labial	Alveolar		Post- alveolar	Palatal	Velar	Uvular	Glottal
		Labial	plain	sibilant	Post- alveolar	Palatal	Velar	Uvular	Glottal
Plosive/ Affricate	voiceless	p	t	ts	tʃ		k	q	ʔ
Plosive/ Affricate	ejective		tʼ	tsʼ	tʃʼ		kʼ	qʼ	
Plosive/ Affricate	implosive	ɓ							
Fricative				s	ʃ			χ	
Nasal		m	n						
Trill			r						
Approximant			l			j	w		

=== Vowels ===
	Front	Central	Back
Close	i iː		u uː
Mid	e eː		o oː
Open		a aː	
