= Salamá =

- Municipality of Guatemala
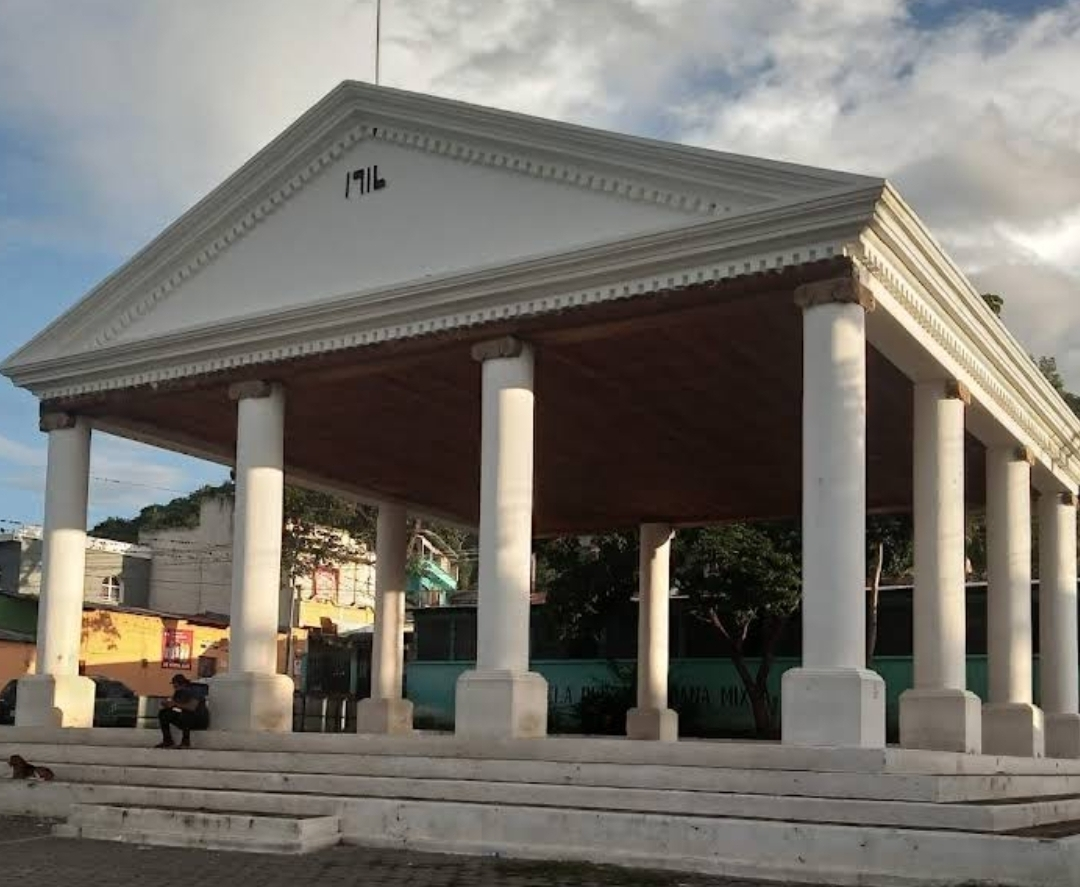
- Minerva Temple of Salamá

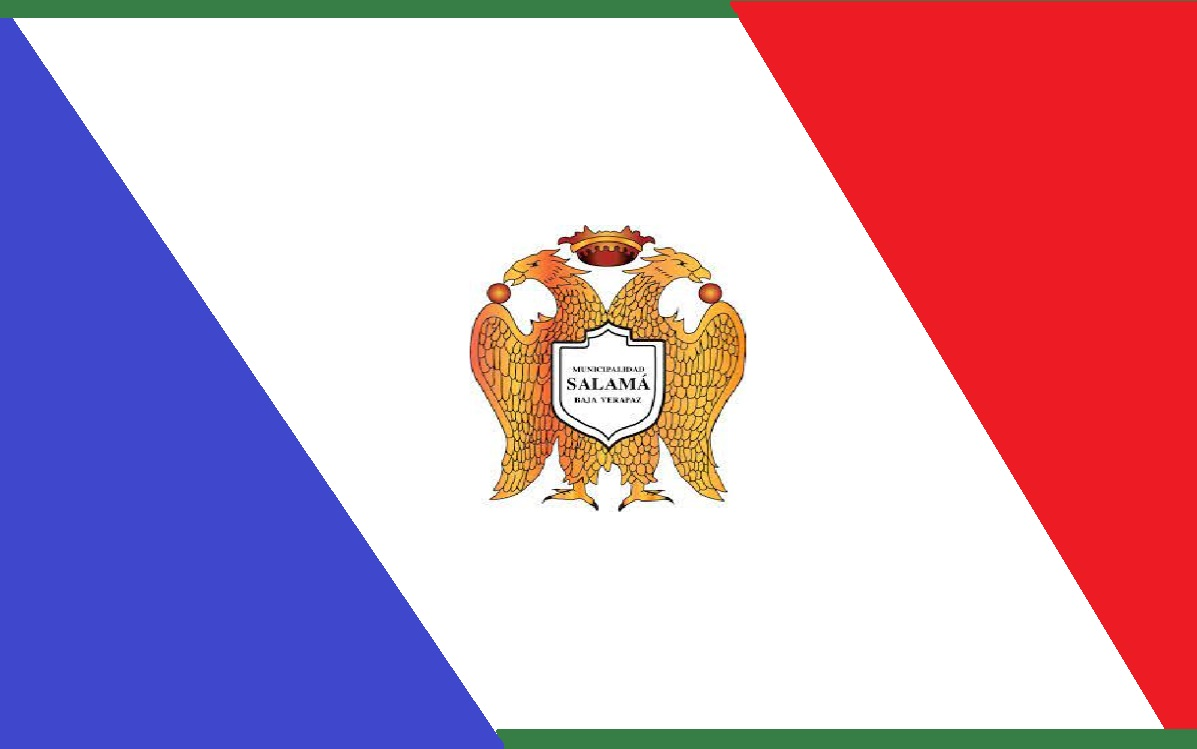
- Flag

- Location in Guatemala
- Coordinates: 15°06′N 90°16′W
- Country: Guatemala
- Department: Baja Verapaz

Government
  - Mayor (2016-2020): Byron Tejeda (PP)

Area
  - Municipality of Guatemala: 295 sq mi (764 km^{2})
- Elevation: 3,080 ft (940 m)

Population (2018 census)
  - Municipality of Guatemala: 65,275
  - Density: 221/sq mi (85.4/km^{2})
  - Urban: 65,275
- Climate: Aw

Salamá is a city in Guatemala. It is the capital of the department of Baja Verapaz and it is situated at 940 m above sea level. The municipality of Salamá, for which the city of Salamá serves as the administrative centre, covers a total surface area of 764 km^{2} with a population of 65,275 inhabitants at the 2018 census.

== Etymology ==
Salamá comes from Kʼicheʼ Tz'alam Ha meaning table on water.

== History ==
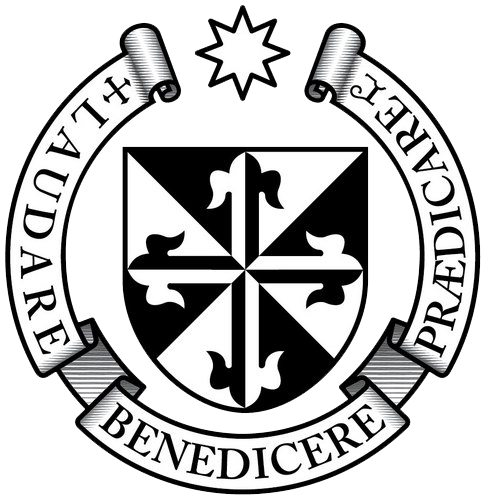
The Order of Preachers settled the Salamá doctrine in the 1550s.

Salamá was settled as a doctrine by the Order of Preachers in the 1550s, as part of the Tezulutlán Capitulations that friar Bartolomé de las Casas lobbied from the Crown. The friars had thousands of acres with hills, forest, a section of the plain and abundant water supply. Both location and weather were ideal for vines; the characteristic soil and dried grass from the rest of the plain was replaced by vines thanks to a superb irrigation system the friars built inspired by the Romans.

After independence in 1821, the Central Ameran liberal criollos tried to remove the Catholic Church from power, along with the Guatemalan aristocrats of the Aycinena family. By 1829, the liberal forces of general Francisco Morazán expelled both the aristocrats and the regular orders from Central America, including the Order of Preachers, one of the richest. In Salamá, they had to leave behind their monastery, church and vines, which were confiscated by the Guatemalan State government, but remained abandoned due to the political turmoil of the times.

=== Battle of Salamá of 1839 ===
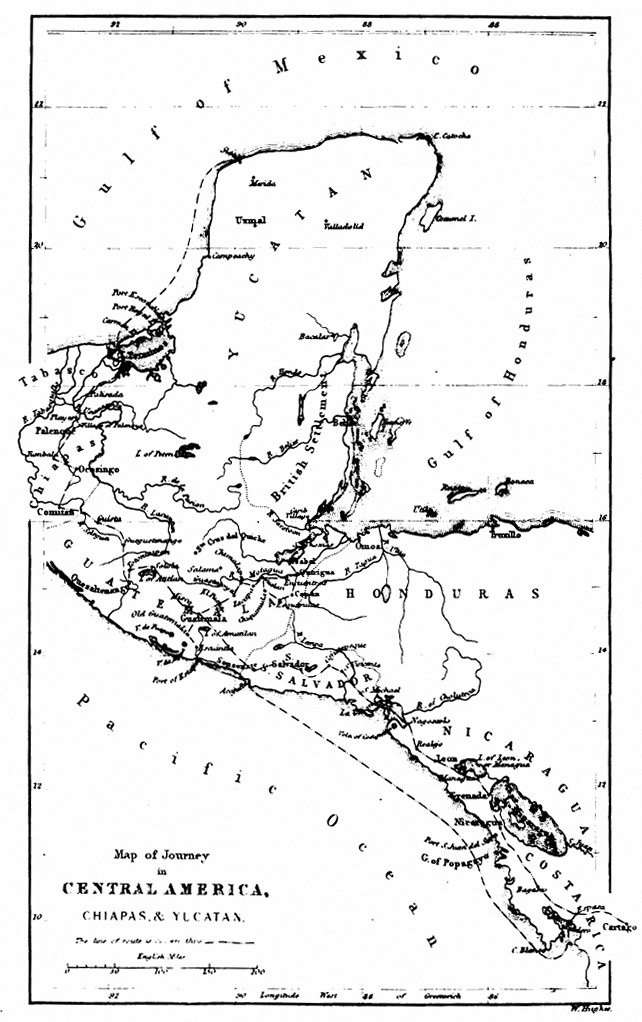
Guatemala State in 1839

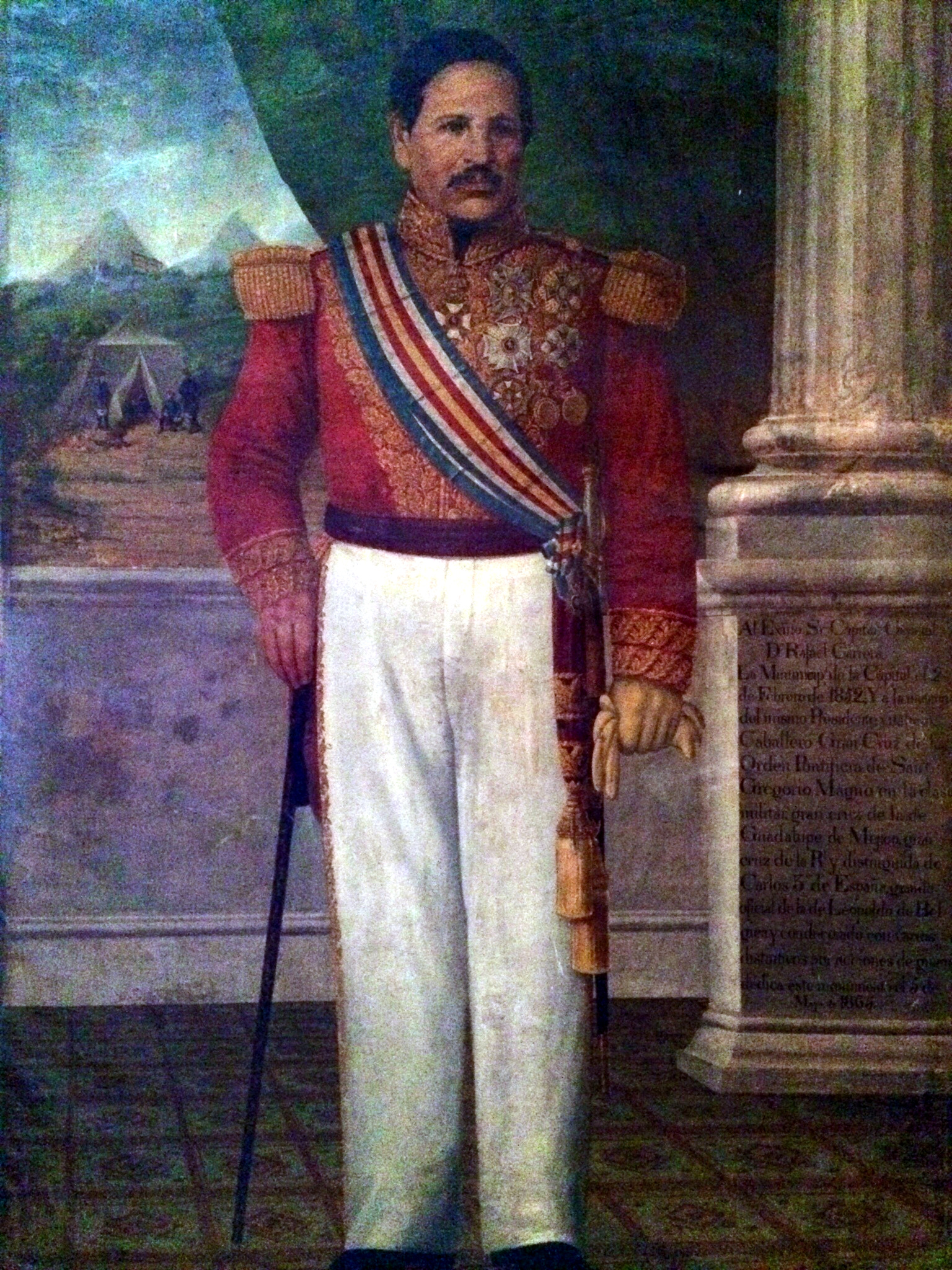
Captain General Rafael Carrera, president for life of Guatemala (1840–1865)

In early 1838, Morazán's liberal forces were back in Guatemala after a peasant revolt ousted Guatemalan governor Mariano Gálvez. Morazán and his Guatemalan ally José Francisco Barrundia invaded Guatemalan soil and when they arrived in San Sur, they summarily executed Chúa Álvarez, general Rafael Carrera's father-in-law, because Carrera was the leader of the revolt. Morazán's soldiers placed Álvarez' head on top of a spike as a warning to Carrera's followers. Upon learning the news, both Carrera and his wife, Petrona Álvarez – who had left Guatemala City to face Morazán and were in Mataquescuintla – promised to avenge Chúan even after Morazán's death. The liberals sent several envoys to try to meet with Carrera, but he did not want to talk to them –especially not to Barrundia, who was told that he should not try to come in to talk to Carrera if he wanted to remain alive. After this, Morazán began a strong offensive, destroying every single town in his path, stealing the few belongings and forcing Carrera militants to hide in the mountains.

Thinking that Carrera was completely defeated, Morazán and Barrundia went on to Guatemala City, where governor Valenzuela and the conservative criollos of the Aycinena family celebrated finally having a leader like Morazán, who had defeated Carrera and his peasant revolt once and for all. The Guatemalans offered to sponsor any campaign that Morazán wanted at that point. Morazán helped Los Altos and appointed Mariano Rivera Paz, who was close to the Aycinena family; however he did not return to the former aristocrats any of their confiscated possessions. In return, Juan José de Aycinena y Piñol, leader of the family, voted in favor of dissolving the Central American Federation, thus forcing Morazán to return to El Salvador to try to save what was left of his presidential powers. On his way to El Salvador, he increased repression, on anybody suspect of helping Carrera in the past.

Knowing that Morazán was on his way to El Salvador, Carrera tried to take Salamá with the little forces that he still had left, but was defeated and even lost his brother Laureano in the battle. With only a handful of men he was able to escape, badly wounded, to Sanarate. After a halfway recovery, Carrera had a few more battles where he won, but suffered considerable casualties.

Finally, the liberal forces captured Carrera, but could not shoot him, because the Central American Federation was in turmoil and they needed the caudillo to keep the peasants in check. Morazán was forced to appoint him as commander in Mita. Morazán would come to regret that decision, as Carrera would eventually defeat him in 1840, finishing the Honduran general run as the main political figure of Central America.

As of 1850, the population was estimated to be 4,500.

=== Miguel Enríquez and president Barillas in 1892 ===
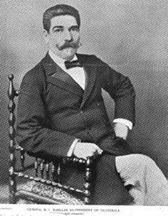
General Manuel Barillas; Guatemalan president from 1886 to 1892

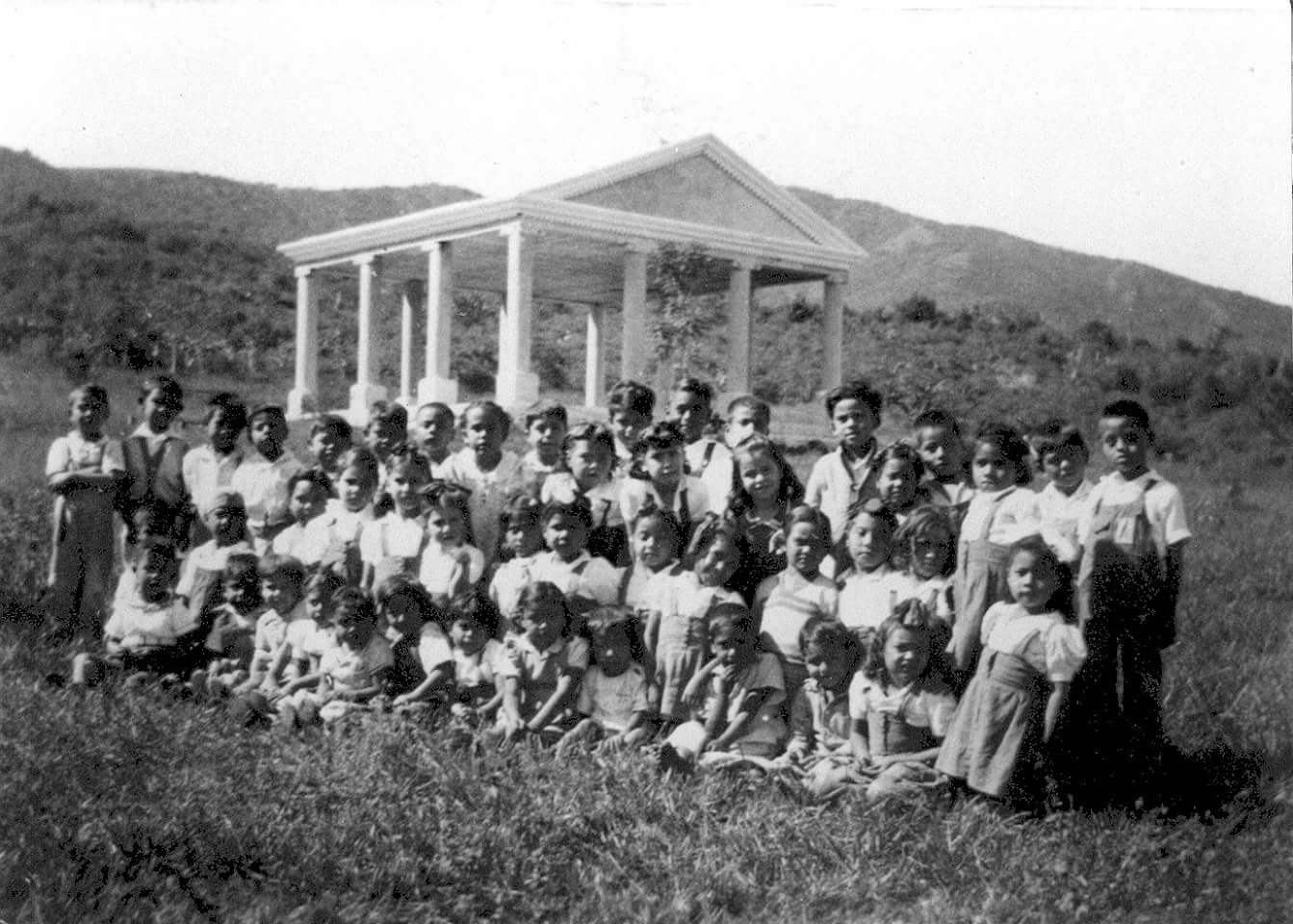
Temple of Minerva, Salamá, 1910

In 1892, president general Manuel Barillas called an election. It was the first time a Guatemalan president had become tired of the office and it was also the first election in Guatemala that allowed the candidates to run propaganda in the local newspapers. Among the candidates who ran for office were:

- Lorenzo Montúfar y Rivera: a well known a respected liberal intellectual. He was the only one of all candidates who made an engraving of his portrait to publish it in the newspapers and was accused of wasting resources for doing this.
- General José María Reina Barrios: nephew of former president Justo Rufino Barrios and eventual winner.
- Miguel Enríquez: a Salamá landowner. Enríquez had been a liberal, but became a conservative after the persecution that he suffered from the Barillas administration.

Barillas was unique among all liberal presidents of Guatemala between 1871 and 1944: he handed over power to his successor peacefully. When election time approached, he sent for the three Liberal candidates to ask them what their government plan would be. Satisfied with the response of Reyna Barrios, Barillas made sure a huge column of Quetzaltenango and Totonicapán Indigenous people came down from the mountains to vote for the general. The official agents did their job: Reyna was elected president and, so as not to offend the losing candidates, Barillas gave them checks to cover the costs of their presidential campaigns. Reyna Barrios of course received nothing, but he went on to become President on March 15, 1892.

Only Enríquez was not compensated; on the contrary, after the elections he had to run away from his farmland in Salamá after being accused of sedition; he was captured and executed near Zacapa.

=== Miguel Ángel Asturias in Salamá ===
In 1904, the father of future Literature Nobel Prize awardee Miguel Ángel Asturias, who was a judge, freed several students that had been detained after rioting. In consequence president Manuel Estrada Cabrera, and removed him from his post. In 1905, the family was forced to move to Salamá, where Miguel Ángel Asturias lived on his grandparents' farm and came in contact with Guatemalan natives for the first time. His nanny, Lola Reyes, was a native girl who told him stories, myths and legends from her culture which eventually would impact heavily in his work. In 1908, when Asturias was nine years old, his family returned to Guatemala City.

Salamá in the 1920s

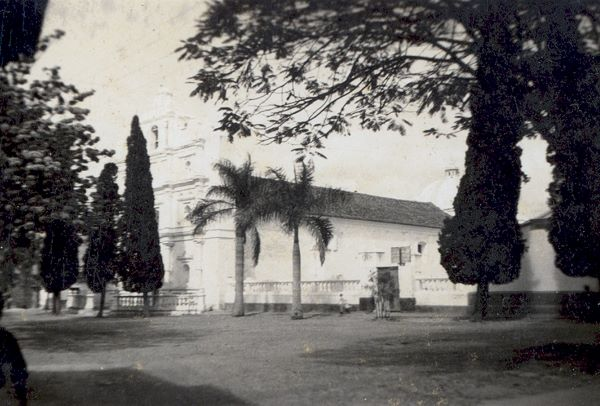
San Mateo church

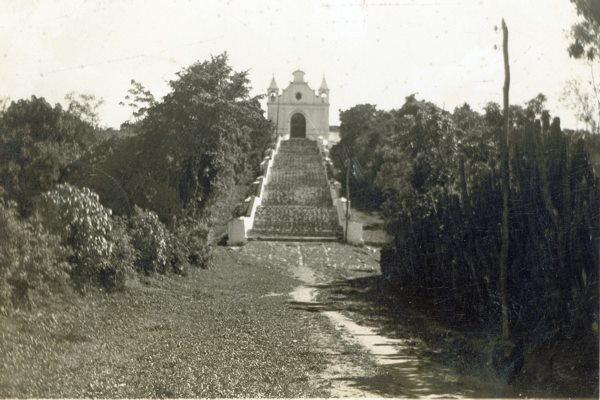
El Calvario church

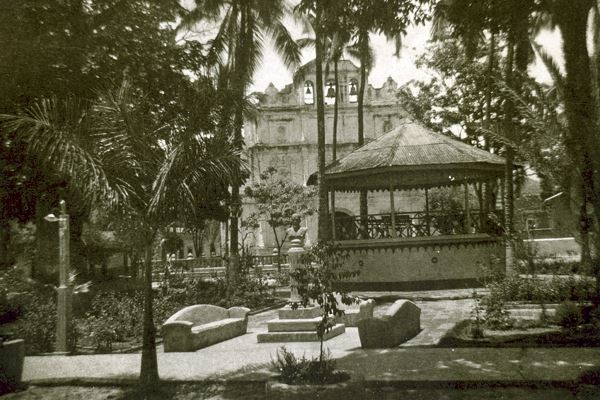
Central Square

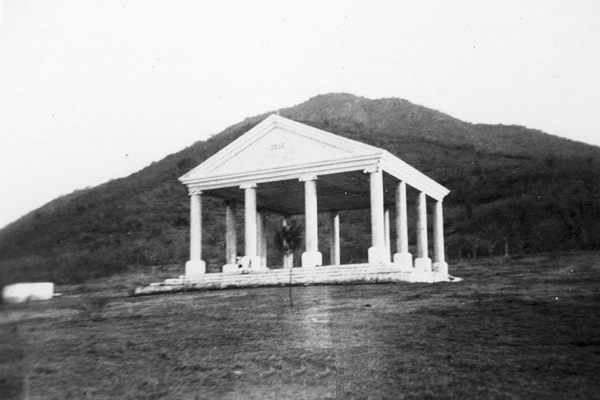
Minerva Temple

=== Anticommunist rebellion in 1953 ===
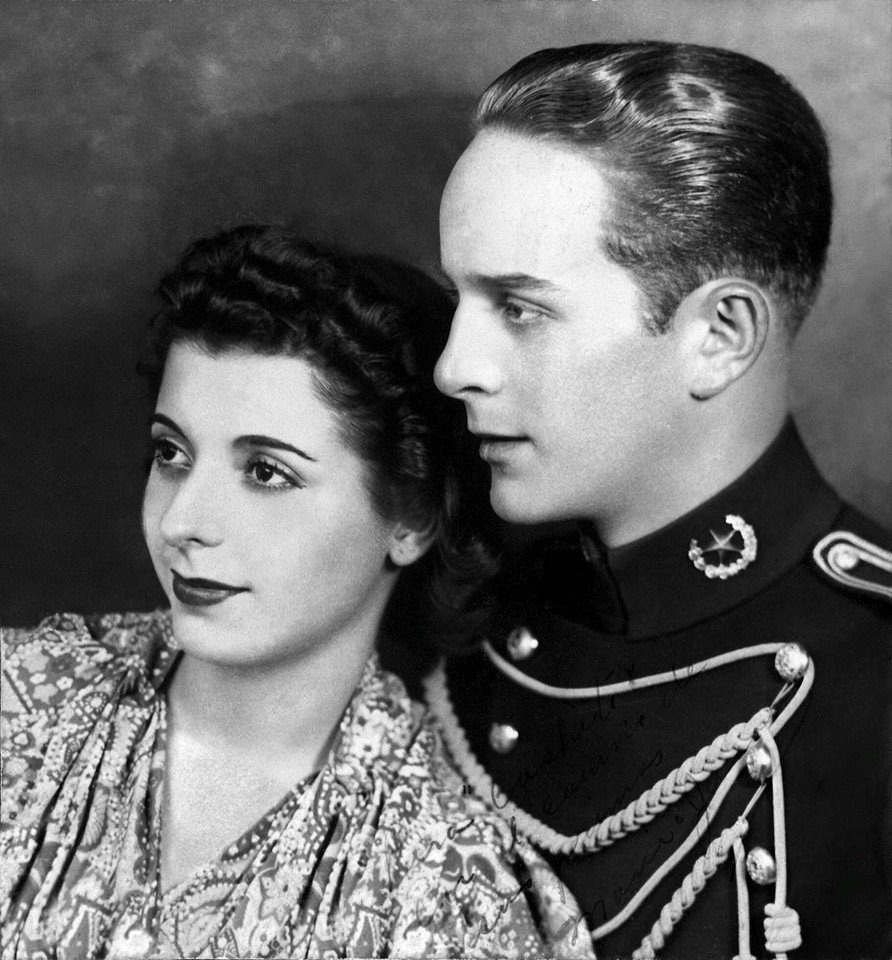
Captain Jacobo Árbenz and his wife, María Cristina Vilanova, ca. 1940

During the revolutionary government of colonel Jacobo Árbenz, the opposition – mainly formed by Guatemalan landlords and United Fruit Company executives – was completely against any reform that the government of Juan José Arévalo had established: social security, creation of commercial and public labor unions, democracy and freedom of press, among others. At the election of Árbenz in 1950, the Guatemalan elite was desperate, but most of its members hoped that the new president would back out of the policies of his predecessor, whom they accused of communism. Árbenz' image convinced them of that: the Guatemalan colonel was married to María Cristina Vilanova, a lady from the Salvadorian elite. He was an Army officer, lived in a mansion in zone 10 in Guatemala City and had the proper aristocratic presence. But their hopes were shattered when Árbenz supported the formation of the Guatemalan Communist Party and then pushed for aggressive agrarian reform. Confronted with the situation, the opposition had only one clear goal: to defend the privileges that they had enjoyed in Guatemala for generations and so they embraced anticommunism to justify their fight against the government. On the other hand, the middle class enjoyed benefits that allowed them to prosper and they were loyal to Árbenz. The peasants were for the first time since the Rafael Carrera government treated with respect and dignity.

This was the political and economic situation of the country when on 29 March 1953 the anticommunist opposition assaulted Salamá at dawn: approximately 100 rebels invaded Salamá and neighboring San Jerónimo. The invasion was not properly organized and by 6:00 a.m. was completedly defeated by army forces that arrived from Cobán. This event however began government prosecution of anticommunist elements, which gradually escalated until it became pure repression in May 1954, when CIA Operation PBSuccess and the Carlos Castillo Armas invasion were well in progress and the Arbenz regime was practically doomed.

== Festivals ==
The annual festival takes place from September 17 to September 22.

== Climate ==
Salamá has a tropical savanna climate (Köppen: Aw).

Climate data for Salamá
Month	Jan	Feb	Mar	Apr	May	Jun	Jul	Aug	Sep	Oct	Nov	Dec	Year
Mean daily maximum °C (°F)	26.6 (79.9)	28.0 (82.4)	29.5 (85.1)	30.6 (87.1)	29.9 (85.8)	28.4 (83.1)	27.9 (82.2)	28.4 (83.1)	28.2 (82.8)	27.7 (81.9)	27.0 (80.6)	26.8 (80.2)	28.3 (82.9)
Daily mean °C (°F)	20.1 (68.2)	21.1 (70.0)	22.5 (72.5)	24.0 (75.2)	23.9 (75.0)	23.6 (74.5)	23.0 (73.4)	23.2 (73.8)	23.0 (73.4)	22.5 (72.5)	21.2 (70.2)	20.4 (68.7)	22.4 (72.3)
Mean daily minimum °C (°F)	13.6 (56.5)	14.2 (57.6)	15.6 (60.1)	17.4 (63.3)	18.0 (64.4)	18.8 (65.8)	18.2 (64.8)	18.0 (64.4)	17.8 (64.0)	17.3 (63.1)	15.4 (59.7)	14.1 (57.4)	16.5 (61.8)
Average precipitation mm (inches)	15 (0.6)	11 (0.4)	16 (0.6)	28 (1.1)	82 (3.2)	204 (8.0)	148 (5.8)	99 (3.9)	169 (6.7)	102 (4.0)	39 (1.5)	16 (0.6)	929 (36.4)
Source: Climate-Data.org; Instituto Nacional de Sismología, Vulcanología, Meteorología e Hidrología de Guatemala

== Geography and location ==
=== Settlements ===
Salamá has 146 settlements, being the main ones:

- San Nicolás
- El Tunal
- El Tempisque
- San Juan
- Paso Ancho
- Las Tunas
- La Laguna
- San Ignacio
- Trapiche de Agua
- Llano Grande
- Los Paxtes
- La Canoa
- Chilascó
- Niño Perdido
- La Unión Barrios
- La Paz 1 y 2
- Cachil
- El Amate
- San José El Espinero
- Las Limas
- El Nance
- Llano Largo
- La Divina Providencia

San Rafael Chilasco is the largest settlement and is a tourist attraction given that it has one of the tallest waterfalls in Central America.

=== Geographic location ===
Salamá is surrounded by Baja Verapaz municipalities, except by South, where it borders Chuarrancho, a Guatemala Department municipality.

== See also ==
- Baja Verapaz
- History of Guatemala
- Order of Preachers
- List of places in Guatemala

== Notes and references ==
=== Bibliography ===
- Bailey, John (1850). Central America; Describing Each of the States of Guatemala, Honduras, Salvador, Nicaragua, and Costa Rica. London: Trelawney Saunders. p. 87.
- Callan, Richard (1970). Miguel Ángel Asturias. Nueva York: Twayne. OCLC 122016.
- Castellanos, Lorena (2014). "Vida y obra de José María Reyna Barrios". Universidad Francisco Marroquín (in Spanish). Guatemala.
- De los Ríos, Efraín (1948). Ombres contra Hombres (in Spanish) (2nd ed.). México: Fondo de la Cultura de la Universidad de México.
- Gleijeses, Piero (1992). Shattered hope: the Guatemalan revolution and the United States, 1944-1954. USA: Princeton University Press. ISBN 9780691025568.
- González Davison, Fernando (2008). La montaña infinita; Carrera, caudillo de Guatemala (in Spanish). Guatemala: Artemis y Edinter. ISBN 978-84-89452-81-7.
- Hernández de León, Federico (1959). "El capítulo de las efemérides". Diario La Hora (in Spanish). Guatemala.
- — (1930). El libro de las efemérides (in Spanish). Vol. III. Guatemala: Tipografía Sánchez y de Guise.
- Instituto Nacional de Estadística (2013). "Publicaciones" (in Spanish). Guatemala. Archived from the original on 10 March 2014.
- Marroquín Rojas, Clemente (1952). "Los ricos con el agua al cuello". Impacto (in Spanish). Guatemala.
- — (February 1954). "El caso del diputado José Luis Arenas". La Hora (in Spanish). Guatemala.
- Martin, Gerald; Asturias, Miguel Ángel (2000). "Cronología". In Martin, Gerald (ed.). El Señor Presidente (in Spanish). Madrid, Spain: ALLCA XX. pp. xxxix–li. ISBN 84-89666-51-2.
- Maudslay, Alfred Percival; Maudslay, Anne Cary (1899). A glimpse at Guatemala, and some notes on the ancient monuments of Central America (PDF). London, United Kingdom: John Murray.
- SEGEPLAN (n.d.). "Municipios de Alta Verapaz, Guatemala". Secretaría General de Planificación y Programación de la Presidencia de la República (in Spanish). Guatemala. Archived from the original on 30 June 2015.
- Stephens, John Lloyd; Catherwood, Frederick (1854). Incidents of travel in Central America, Chiapas, and Yucatan. London, United Kingdom: Arthur Hall, Virtue and Co.
