= Baja Verapaz Department =

Department of Guatemala

Baja Verapaz Department Departmento de Baja Verapaz
- Department
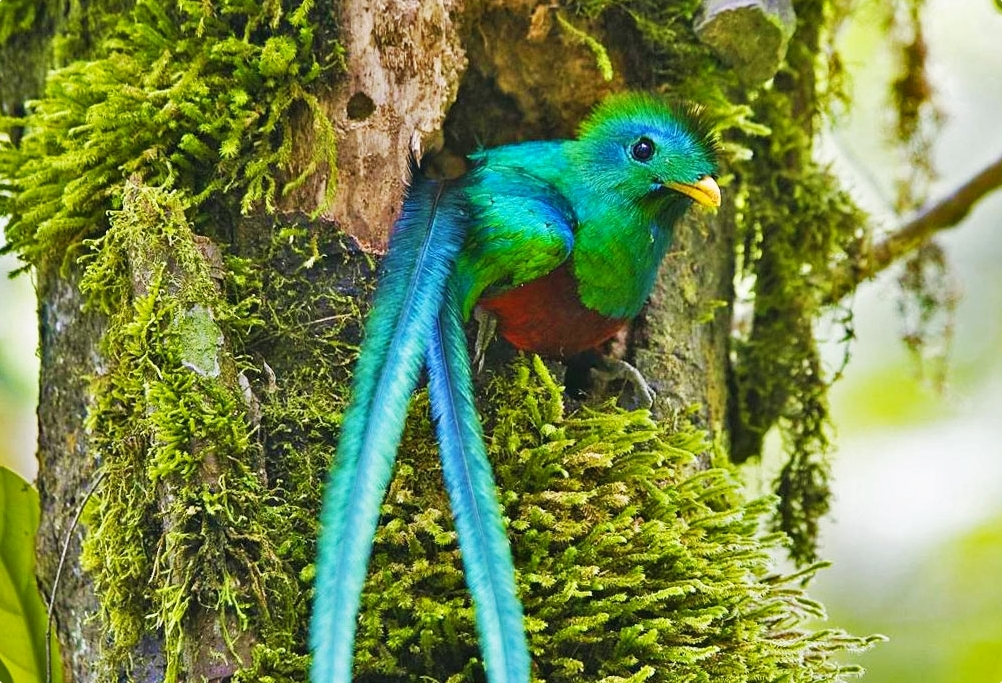
- Quetzal Biotope in Salamá

- Flag Coat of arms

- Country: Guatemala
- Capital: Salamá
- Municipalities: 8

Area
  - Department: 3,124 km^{2} (1,206 sq mi)

Population (2018)
  - Department: 299,476
  - Density: 95.86/km^{2} (248.3/sq mi)
  - Urban: 120,281
- Time zone: UTC-6

Baja Verapaz (Spanish pronunciation: [ˈbaxa βeɾaˈpas]) is a department in Guatemala. In 2018, the population of the department was 299,476. The capital is Salamá. 78.5% of the department's population identifies as Maya, with 53% belonging to the Achi linguistic group.

Baja Verapaz contains the Mario Dary Biotope Preserve, preserving the native flora and fauna of the region, especially the endangered national bird of Guatemala, the Resplendent Quetzal.

== Municipalities ==
- Cubulco
- Granados
- Purulhá
- Rabinal
- Salamá
- San Jerónimo
- San Miguel Chicaj
- Santa Cruz El Chol
