= Chuj people =

Group of Maya people

Chuj
Total population
- c. 94,000

Regions with significant populations
- Guatemala: 91,391
- Huehuetenango: 89,663
- Mexico: approx. 3,000

Languages
- Chuj, Spanish

Religion
- Catholic, Evangelicalist, Maya religion

The Chuj or Chuh are a Maya people, whose homeland is in Guatemala and Mexico. Population estimates vary between 30,000 and over 60,000. Their Indigenous language is also called Chuj and belongs to the Q'anjobalan branch of Mayan languages. Most Chuj live in the Guatemalan department of Huehuetenango, in the municipalities of San Mateo Ixtatán and San Sebastián Coatán, with small numbers also residing in the neighboring border areas of the Mexican state of Chiapas. Los Angeles is believed to have a relatively large population of undocumented Chuj immigrants.

The Chuj, and their ancestors, are believed to have lived in the same area for 4,000 years. They first came into contact with Spanish conquistadores in the 1530s; however, they were not finally subdued by the Spanish colonial authorities until the 1680s. In the post-Colonial era, the Chuj lost much of their communal land, reducing them to extreme poverty. This resulted in a history of violent resistance to authority culminating in guerrilla activity against Guatemala's military junta in the 1980s.

== Ethnonym ==

Central America. Circled in red, the homeland of the Chuj in the highlands of north western Guatemala and adjacent areas of the Mexican state of Chiapas.

The name Chuj is an exonym first used by the Spanish. According to folk tradition, the term was coined by Tzeltal conscripts of the Spanish, for whom it meant the loose wool overgarment traditionally worn by Chuj men. The Chuj themselves use an autonym based on their town of origin, i.e. ajSan Matéyo (from San Mateo Ixtatán), ajSan Sabastyán (from San Sebastián Coatán), or ajNenton (from Nentón).

== Overview and demographics ==
The Chuj are a small grouping of Mayan people who live in Guatemala and Mexico. Following emigration to the United States in the 1980s, large numbers of the Chuj also live in Los Angeles.

Most of the Chuj live in Guatemala, in the highlands of the department of Huehuetenango. Their main centres of settlement in Huehuetenango are the towns of San Mateo Ixtatán and San Sebastián Coatán with some living in parts of the town of Nentón. Additionally, small numbers also live in the Mexican state of Chiapas.

Estimates of total numbers vary from 30,000 to over 60,000. The populations of San Mateo Ixtatán and San Sebastián Coatán, both of which are almost wholly Chuj, are about 16,000 and 9,000 respectively. There are nearly 4,000 Chuj-speakers in Nentón constituting about a third of the town. Because of the irregular immigrant status of the Chuj in the U.S., it is not known how many Chuj live in Los Angeles, but one estimate is that it equals the population of San Sebastián Coatán.

In Guatemala, the Chuj have a reputation for rebelliousness and antagonism to authority, the historic causes of which arise out of poverty and grievances over land distribution.

== History ==
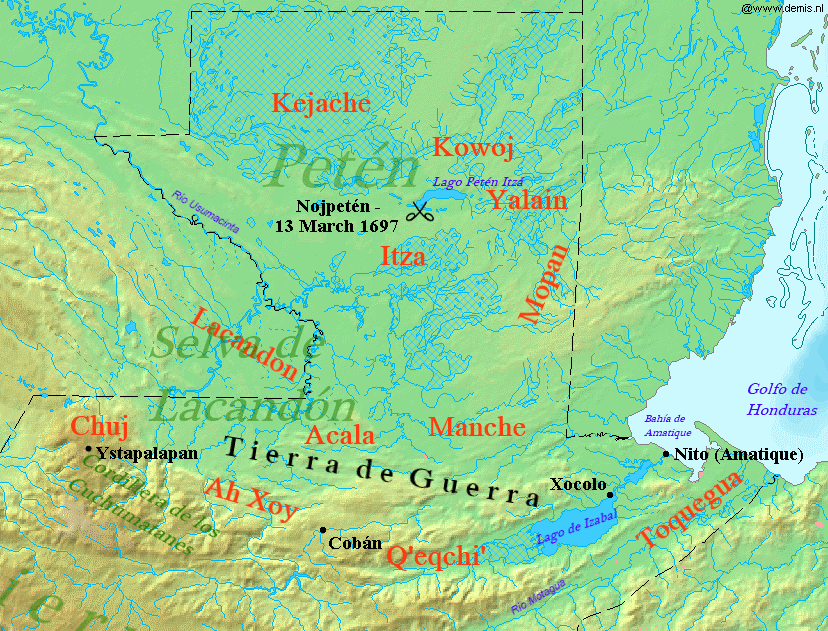

North Guatemala at the time of first contact with the Spanish: Chuj territory circled in red.

=== Pre-Columbian era ===
The Chuj live in an area believed to have been the Proto-Mayan language homeland and they and their ancestors are thought to have lived there continuously since Proto-Maya began splitting into the modern Maya languages about 4,000 years ago. There is, on the outskirts of the modern town of San Mateo Ixtatán, archaeological evidence of a Chuj urban settlement, Wajxaklajun, also known as Ystapalapán, which includes mounds and plazas and dates from between 600 and 900 A.D.

Like other Maya, the Chuj were a settled farming people who cultivated maize and beans. As far as the Chuj's political history is concerned, it is known that they were subject to K'iche' domination in the 15th century but freed themselves from K'iche' control in the early 16th century.

=== Spanish conquest ===
The Spanish conquest of the Maya territories of the Guatemalan highlands began in 1524 when the conquistador Pedro de Alvarado led his army into the region. In 1529 the Chuj city of San Mateo Ixtatán (that is, Wajxaklajun) was given in encomienda to Gonzalo de Ovalle (es), a companion of Pedro de Alvarado, together with Santa Eulalia and Jacaltenango. In the 1530s, the Chuj submitted to the Spanish conquest and, in 1549, the first Chuj reduccion was established at San Mateo Ixtatán, overseen by Dominican missionaries. The Chuj of San Mateo Ixtatán remained rebellious and resisted Spanish control for longer than their highland neighbours; their resistance was so determined that the Chuj remained pacified only while the immediate effects of the Spanish expeditions lasted. But the longer-term effect was that disease and warfare substantially reduced Chuj numbers in the 16th century.

San Mateo Ixtatán

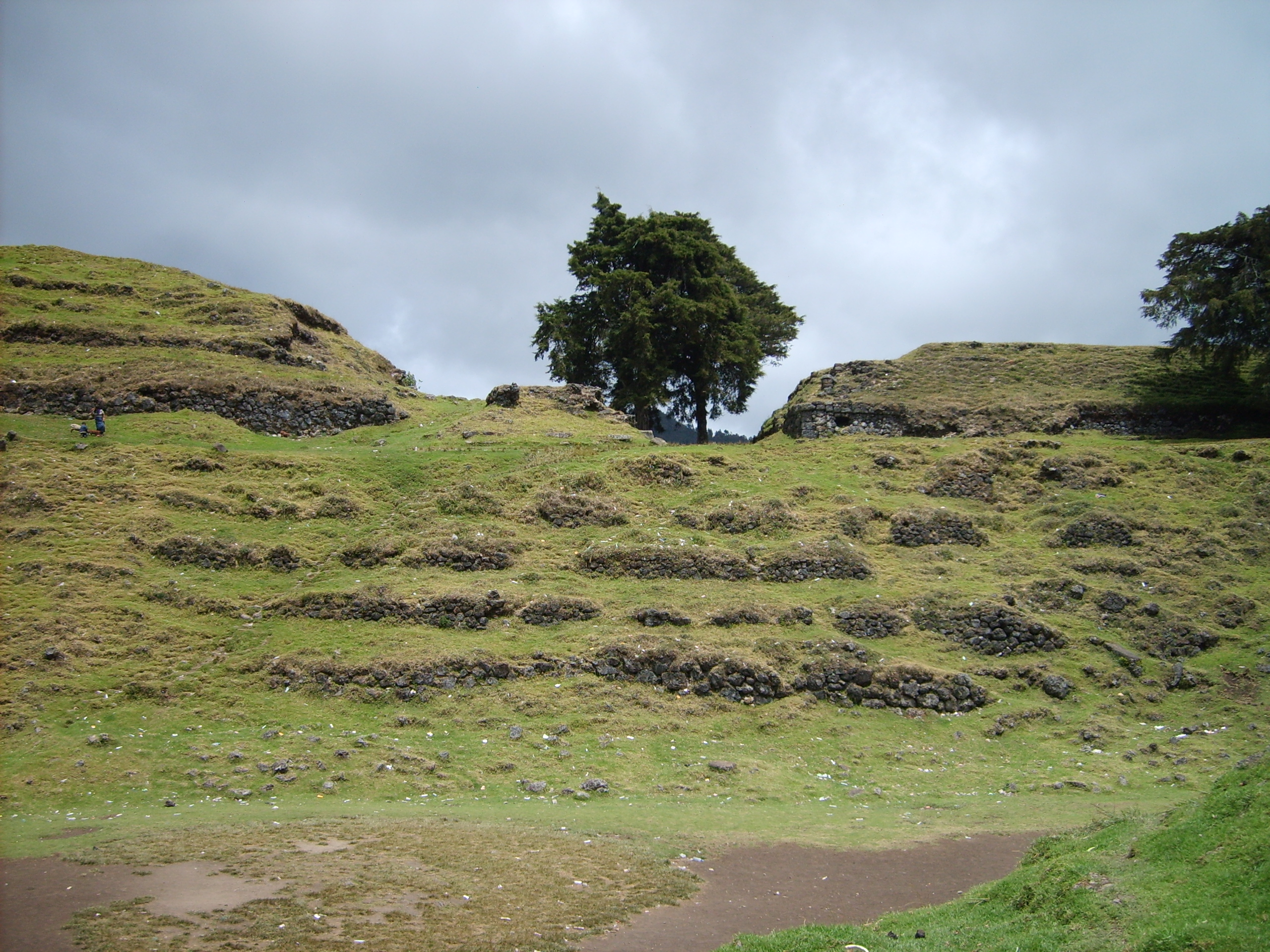
The ruins of Wajxaklajun, the pre-Columbian Chuj settlement at San Mateo Ixtatán

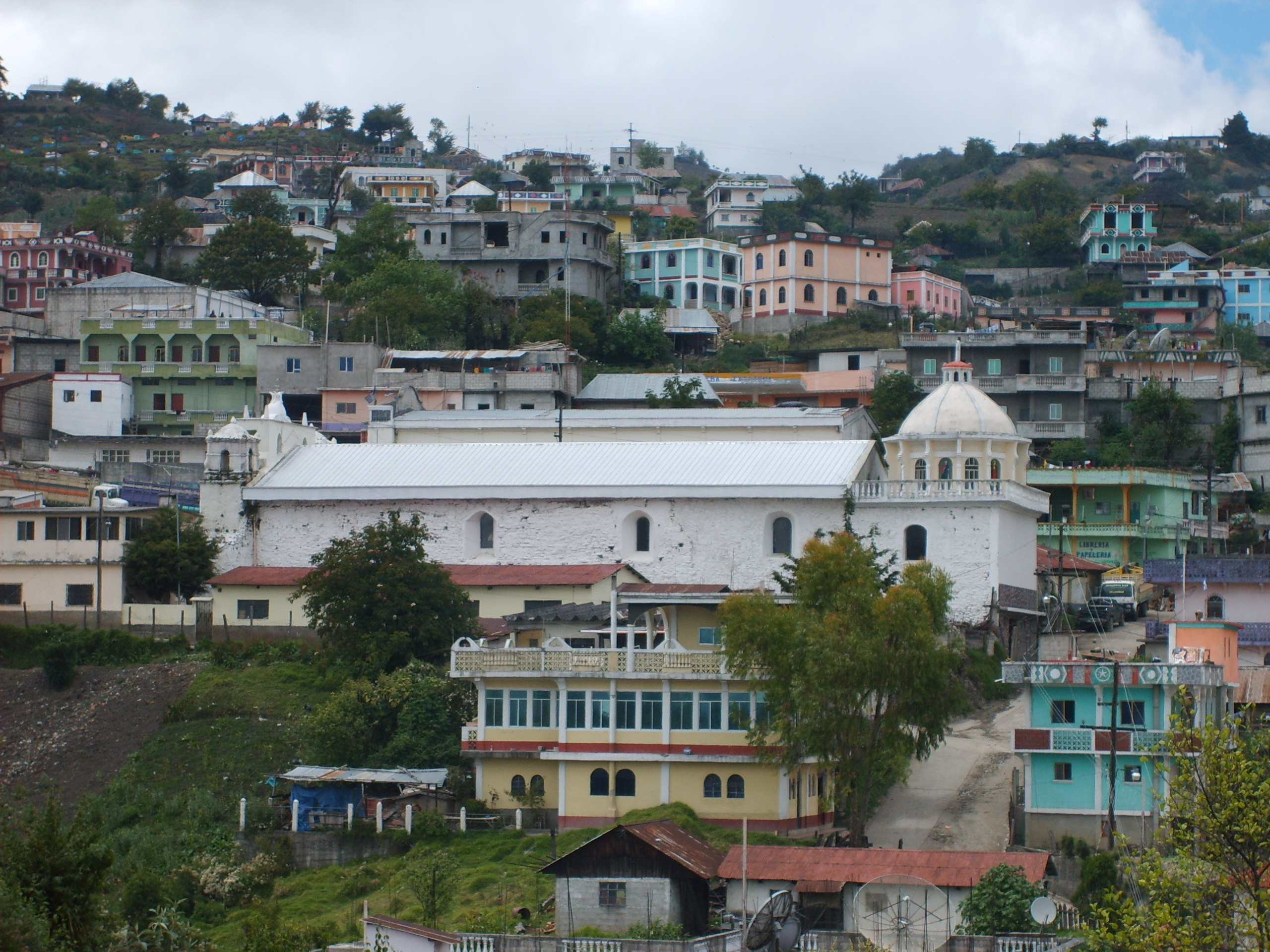
The modern city of San Mateo Ixtatán, still the home of many of the Chuj

In the late 17th century, the Spanish missionary Alonso de León reported that about 80 families lived in San Mateo Ixtatán but that they did not pay tribute to the Spanish Crown or attend the Roman Catholic mass. He described the inhabitants as "quarrelsome" and complained that their religious practices were such that they were Christian in name only: they had built a pagan shrine in the hills among the ruins of pre-Columbian temples, where they burnt incense and offerings and sacrificed turkeys. Eventually, de León was driven out of San Mateo Ixtatán by the Chuj.

In 1684, Enrique Enriquez de Guzmán, the governor of Guatemala, decided on the final conquest of the region. In 1686, the Governor himself arrived in San Mateo Ixtatán, after sending in troops under Captain Melchor Rodríguez Mazariegos, and successfully took control of the town. After recruiting Chuj warriors from the nearby villages, including 61 from San Mateo itself, he launched an invasion of the still unconquered Lacandon region from San Mateo Ixtatán and completed the conquest of the area.

=== Post-colonial era ===
Guatemala gained its independence from Spain in 1821. In the late 19th century the Guatemalan government sanctioned the transfer of Chuj tribal land to powerful agricultural land owners. The process began in 1876, when they were forced to cede land to create the new municipality of Nentón. In the fighting that followed, the Chuj managed to maintain their communal lands in the high mountains, and this prompted their modern reputation for rebelliousness. With the loss of much of their land, and the resultant extreme poverty, many of the Chuj were forced to migrate to Guatemala's southern coast. As a people, they were reduced to becoming either peasants or migrant labourers.

In the years that followed, the Chuj were involved in frequent uprisings and violent unrest caused by extreme poverty and a sense of grievance because of the loss of their lands. Political unrest and bloody reprisals against the Chuj increased after the Second World War. By the 1970s, violent confrontations with the Guatemalan police were common. In the late 1970s and early 1980s the confrontation with Guatemalan authorities became focused on the Chuj campaign to preserve their forests in the region. By the 1980s, when Guatemala was ruled by a military junta, the Chuj were involved in full-scale guerrilla activity against the Army, who regarded them as "internal enemies". During the decade, about 25% of the Chuj emigrated to the United States.

== Culture ==
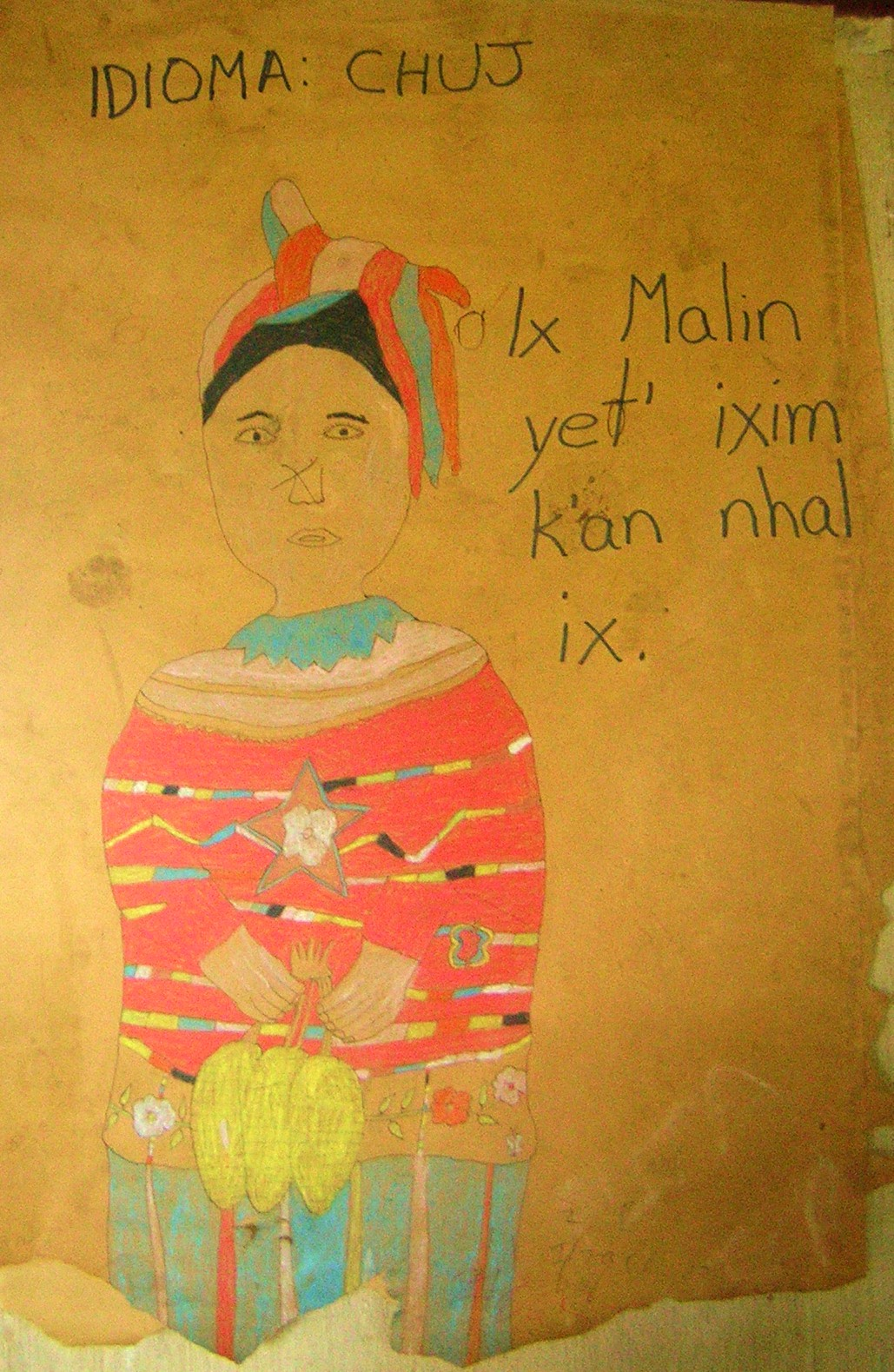
Chuj folk art: a Chuj woman with text in the Chuj language alluding to Maya corn culture

=== Language ===
The Chuj historically speak a language, also called Chuj, which is part of the Q'anjobalan branch of the Mayan languages. It is most closely related to Tojolab'al, spoken in Mexico. The Chuj now also speak Spanish and are bilingual.

Although the Chuj language remains viable, as with other Mayan languages, children, particularly in urban centres, increasingly do not learn Chuj as a first language or, in some cases, at all.

=== Marriage and family ===
The Chuj traditionally have arranged marriages, although Church weddings are relatively rare because of the cost of having a priest officiate. Chuj men also practise "bride kidnapping" where a woman is effectively abducted rather than her family formally petitioned for her hand.

Descent is reckoned bilaterally and each side is of equal importance. Typically, the nuclear family shares a compound with the husband's brothers and parents and economic and child care activities are shared within the compound. The extended family will own several small parcels of land, at varying distances from the town center. In San Mateo and San Sebastián there is also access to communal land.

=== Religion and beliefs ===
Traditional Chuj beliefs, where most natural features, like hills, rock outcrops, streams, and caves are believed to be inhabited by the spirits, remain strong. The spirits in caves, who are often seen as ancestors of the townspeople, may be approached for aid and advice. Death is the transition to "ancestorhood." Deathbed instructions are binding obligations, and spirits enforce them with sanctions of illness and misfortune. These spirits can be approached for advice and aid at family altars, cave entrances, hilltops, or, in San Mateo, at cross-sites and accesses to the Maya structures underneath the modern city.

Catholicism is prevalent as well: in San Mateo it is syncretic, combining with traditional beliefs, while in San Sebastián there is a sharp divide between those that hold traditional beliefs and those that follow the activist Catholicism of the Catholic Action group in the town.

=== Dress ===
The Chuj wear distinctive "trade" garments which vary between each of the towns. Men usually wear a wool short-sleeved tunic, lightly embroidered at the neck and arms. Women wear a cotton broadcloth overblouse elaborately embroidered in red, yellow, green, and black.
