= Tojolabal =

Tojolabal or Tojolabʼal may refer to:

- Tojolabal people, an ethnic group of Mexico
- Tojolabʼal language, a Mayan language
