= Motozintleco =

Motozintleco may refer to:

- Motozintlecos, an ethnic group of Mexico
- Motozintleco language, a Mayan language
