= Yuxquen =

Coordinates: 16°01′N 91°37′W

Yuxquén is a village in Nentón municipality, Guatemala. It is in an area of forests with varied wildlife, near a lagoon Obnhajab'. Yuxquen residents are bilingual, they speak Spanish and the Mayan language Chuj.

Yuxquen

https://maps.google.com/?q=Yuxquen&ftid=0x858ceef5d7b1f127:0x1c5731fbcca71f48&hl=es&gl=es
