= Wajxaklajun =

Mayan ruin in Guatemala

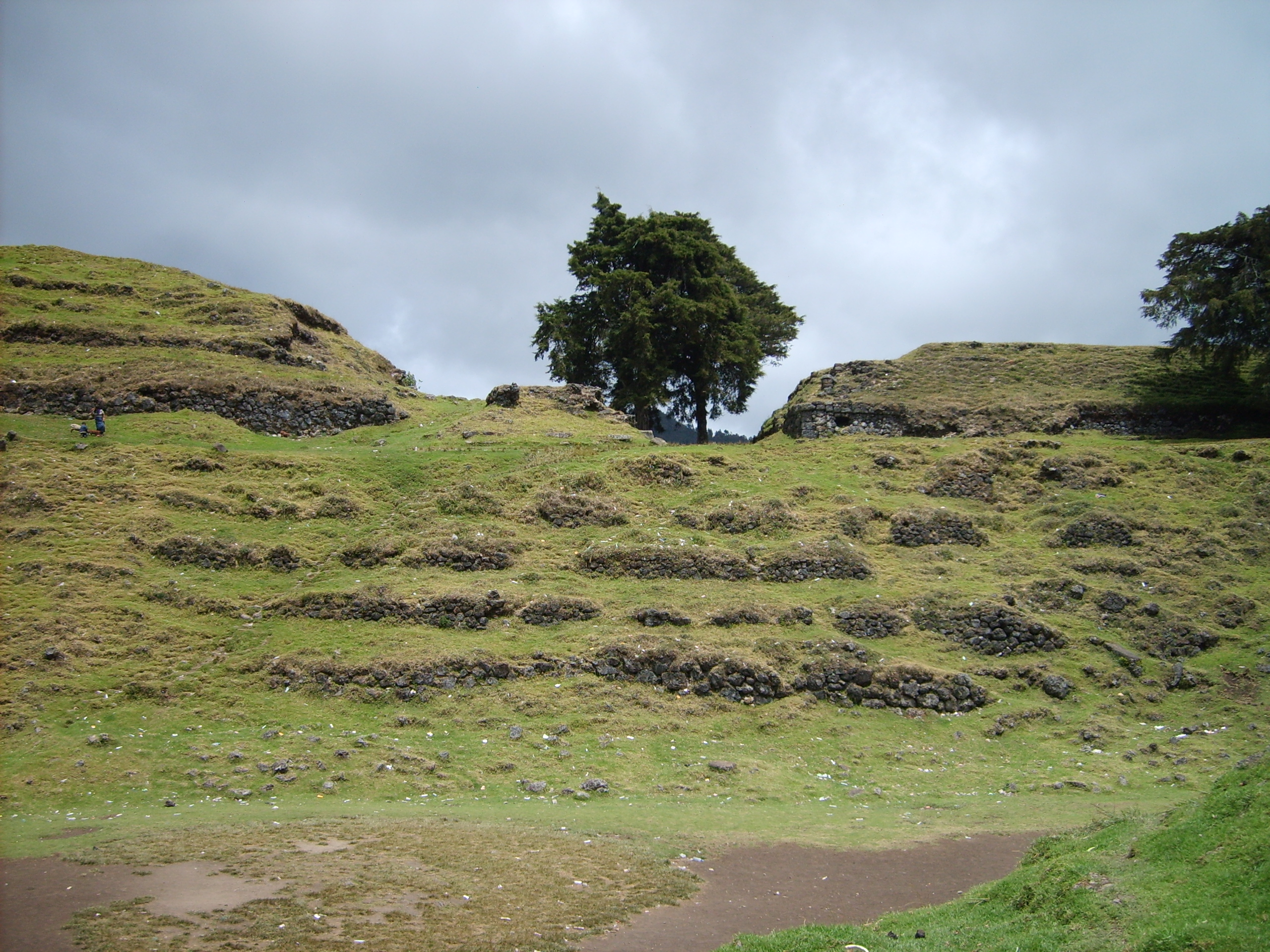
- Ruins of Wajxahlajun

- Location within Guatemala
- 15°49′43.43″N 91°28′26.23″W
- Periods: Classic to Postclassic
- Cultures: Maya civilization
- Location: San Mateo Ixtatán
- Region: Huehuetenango Department, Guatemala

History
- Abandoned: 16th century
- Event(s): Conquered by: Spanish Empire

Wajxaklajun (pronounced [waχʃaklaˈχun]) (also known as Ystapalapán, Yolk'u, El Calvario, Carvao and Curvao) is a ruin of the ancient Maya civilization situated adjacent to the modern town of San Mateo Ixtatán, in the Huehuetenango Department of Guatemala. Wajxaklajun is considered to be the most important archaeological site in the San Mateo Ixtatán area. The site has been dated to the Classic period (c. 250–900 AD). The Chuj Maya consider the city to have been built by their ancestors. The site has similarities with other nearby highland Maya ruins; it is unusual for the presence of a number of stelae, a feature more associated with lowland sites during the Classic period, probably indicating some level of exchange with lowland cities.

== Etymology ==
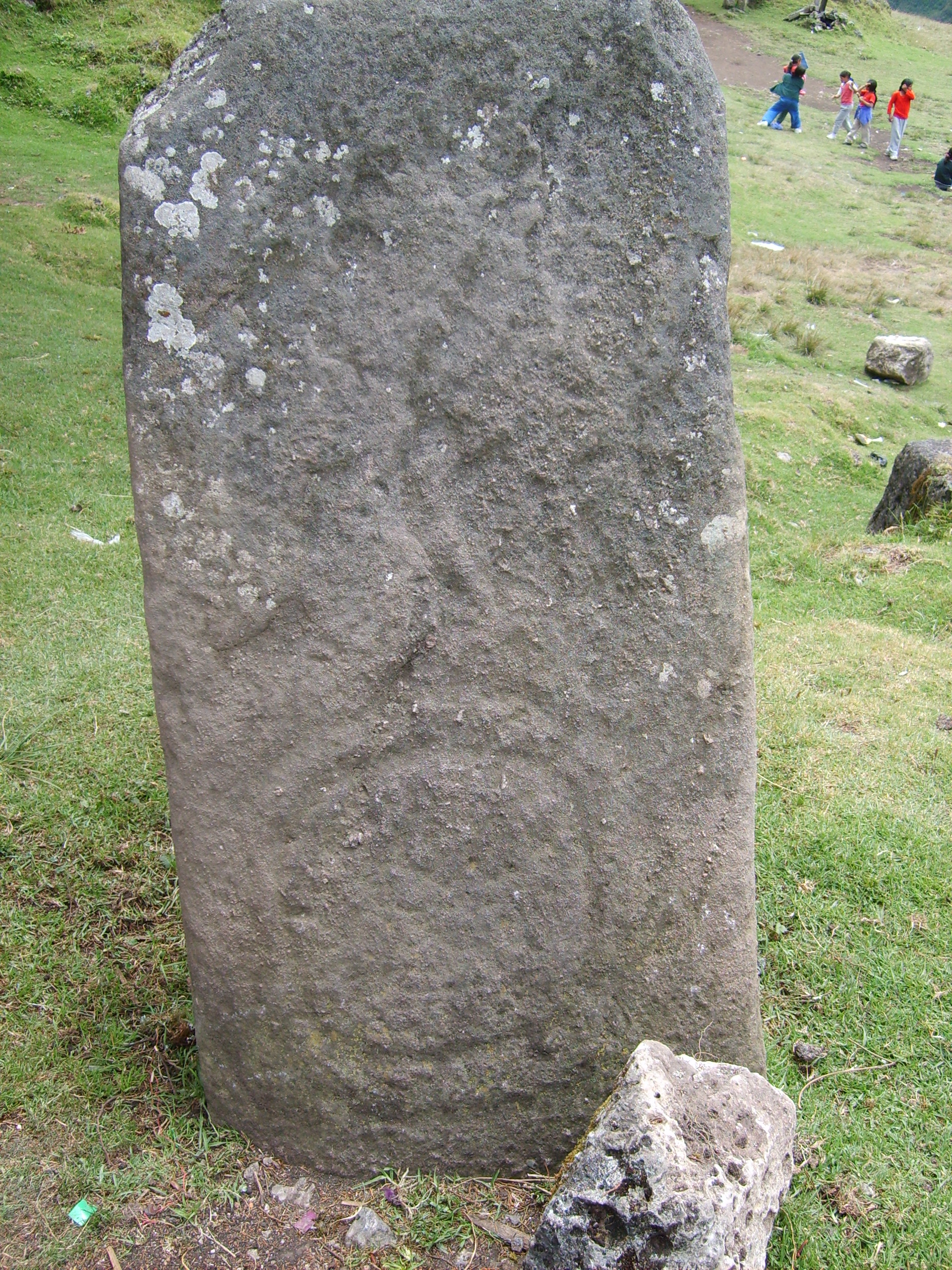
Stela at Wajxaklajun

Wajxaklajun means "eighteen" in the Chuj language; this has been interpreted as deriving from the site originally consisting of eighteen mounds. This is a modern interpretation however, and it is possible that the name originally derived from a Maya calendrical name. A longer form of the name has been recorded as Chonjab' Tepan Wajxaklajun; this translates as "town and temple eighteen", from chonhap' "town", and tepan "church". Alternative names for the site include Yolk'u (meaning "in the sun") and El Calvario, sometimes contracted to Carvao, or Curvao. At the time of the Spanish conquest of Guatemala, Wajxaklajun was given the Nahuatl name Ystapalapán (meaning "place of salt"); this was later modified to Ystatlan ("abundance of salt" in Nahuatl).

== Location ==
Wajxaklajun is situated upon a ridge in the Cuchumatanes range, at an altitude of 2,540 metres (8,330 ft), immediately to the east of the town of San Mateo Ixtatán, within the Huehuetenango Department of Guatemala. Wajxaklajun is 40 kilometres (25 mi) east of the Classic-period site of Quen Santo, and is 60 kilometres (37 mi) from Chinkultic.

== Interactions with neighbouring groups ==
The site is likely to have had trade links with highland Chiapas, in Mexico, and indirectly with the Maya lowlands. The Chuj are believed to have traded salt from the local springs with the Tojolabal Maya in return for cacao. Local tradition holds that the Chuj captured the salt springs from the Tojolabal in battle.

== Site description ==
The main axis of the site has an orientation of S 52° E, aligned along the spur occupied by the ruins. The site is distributed over three different levels, consisting of the ground level of the ridge, an area of elevated terrain to the northeast, and a depression to the southwest. The elevation and the depression were both natural features that were incorporated into the pre-Columbian town. Several range structures are situated upon the northeastern portion of the ridge, and upon the elevation, with a view across the valley to nearby salt springs. The slope occupying the southwestern portion of the site was modified with the construction of five stepped platforms, in a similar manner to that of Mesoamerican pyramids. The lower portion of the site supports a large structure that was probably a pyramid.

Unusually, Wajxaklajun possesses a number of stelae. Stelae were rarely erected in the highlands after the Preclassic period, and their presence at the site may indicate contacts with the Maya lowlands, where a strong tradition of raising stelae existed during the Classic period. Wajxaklajun is close to Quen Santo, a Classic-period site with hieroglyphic inscriptions.

The first modern investigator to mention the ruins was Franz Termer, a German who visited the site in 1926, and mentioned it in print the following year. La Farge and Byres published a detailed description of the site in 1931. Investigators in the first half of the 20th century identified close similarities between Wajxaklajun and nearby sites in Chiapas, such as Tenam Puente and Chinkultic, as well as similarities with Zaculeu, the Mam capital, near modern Huehuetenango city.

La Farge and Byres described the site in terms of three levels.

=== Level 1 ===
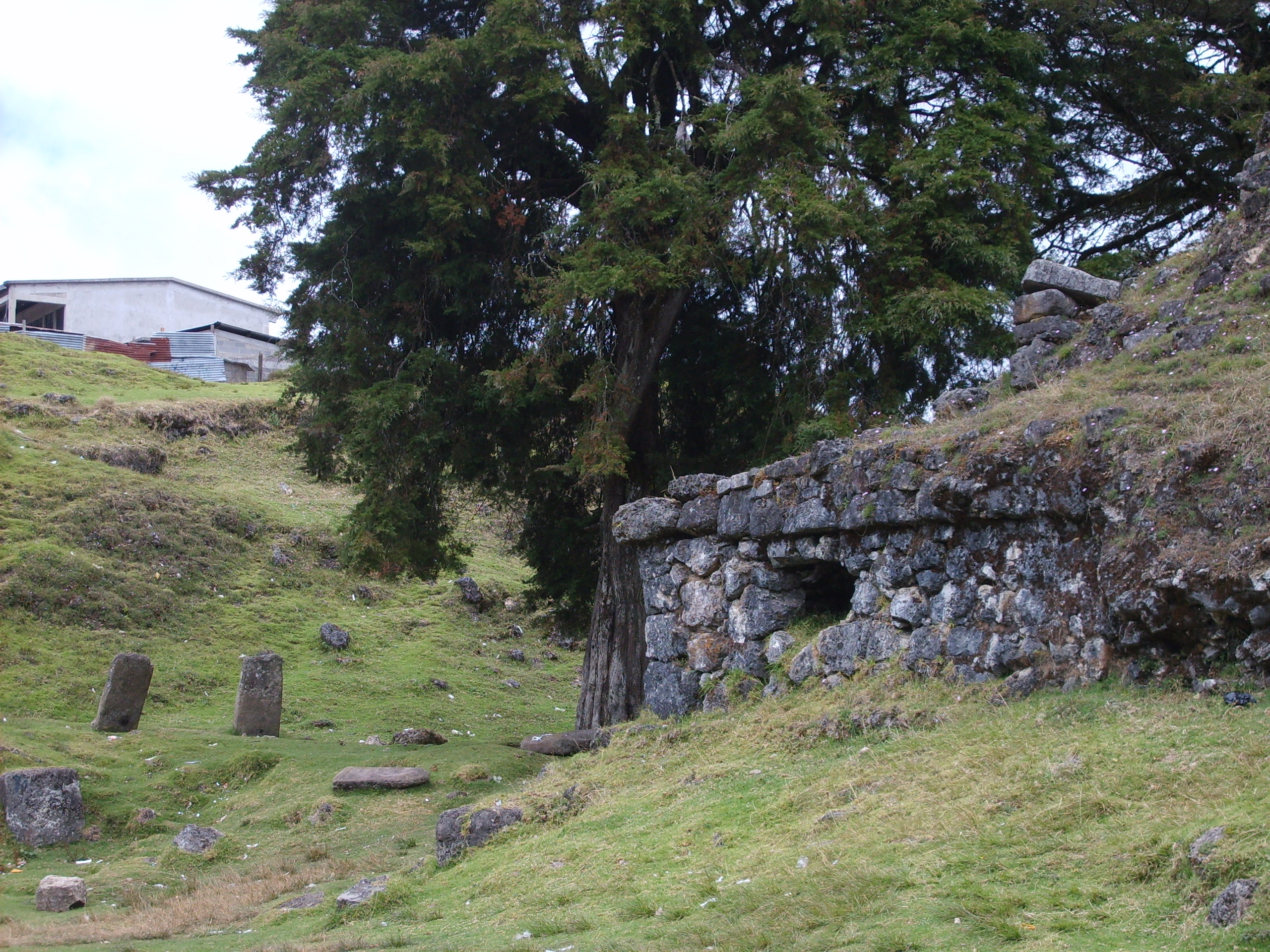
Exposed stonework and stelae on Level 2

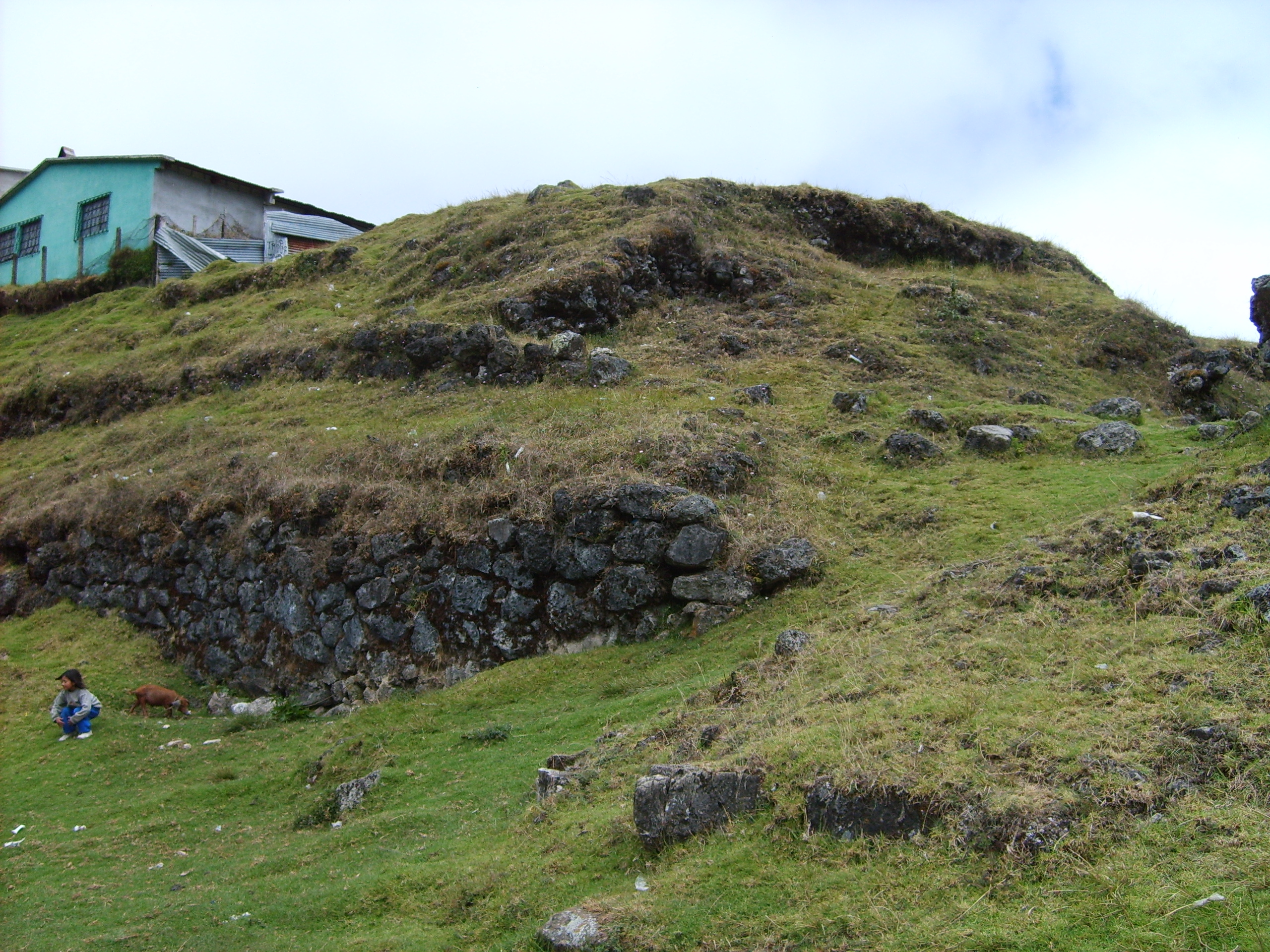
The ruins of Building 10, with Mound E in the foreground

This level consists of the highest portion of the site, occupying the northern portion of the ridge. A portion of the southeastern side of Level 1 is exposed bedrock; the rest of the southeast side, together with the southwest side, have been terraced into steps. Access to Level 1 from Level 2 is presumed to have been by a stairway on the southeast side, but any evidence of these has been eroded by a modern path.

Mound E is to the southeast of Building 10. It occupied an intermediary terrace between Levels 1 and 2, on the southeast side of Level 1.

Mound G is situated at the northern extreme of the archaeological site. It was heavily overgrown when examined in the early 20th century, and supported two wooden crosses.

Building 10 stands approximately 35 metres (115 ft) southeast of Mound G, separated from it by a flat expanse. The building stands atop an artificially levelled terrace. The terrain drops away sharply on the northeast, southeast and southwest sides. In the early 20th century, the walls stood almost 3 metres (9.8 ft) high and were over 1 metre (3.3 ft) thick; it is possible that it represented the remains of an early colonial building, perhaps a church or town hall.

=== Level 2 ===
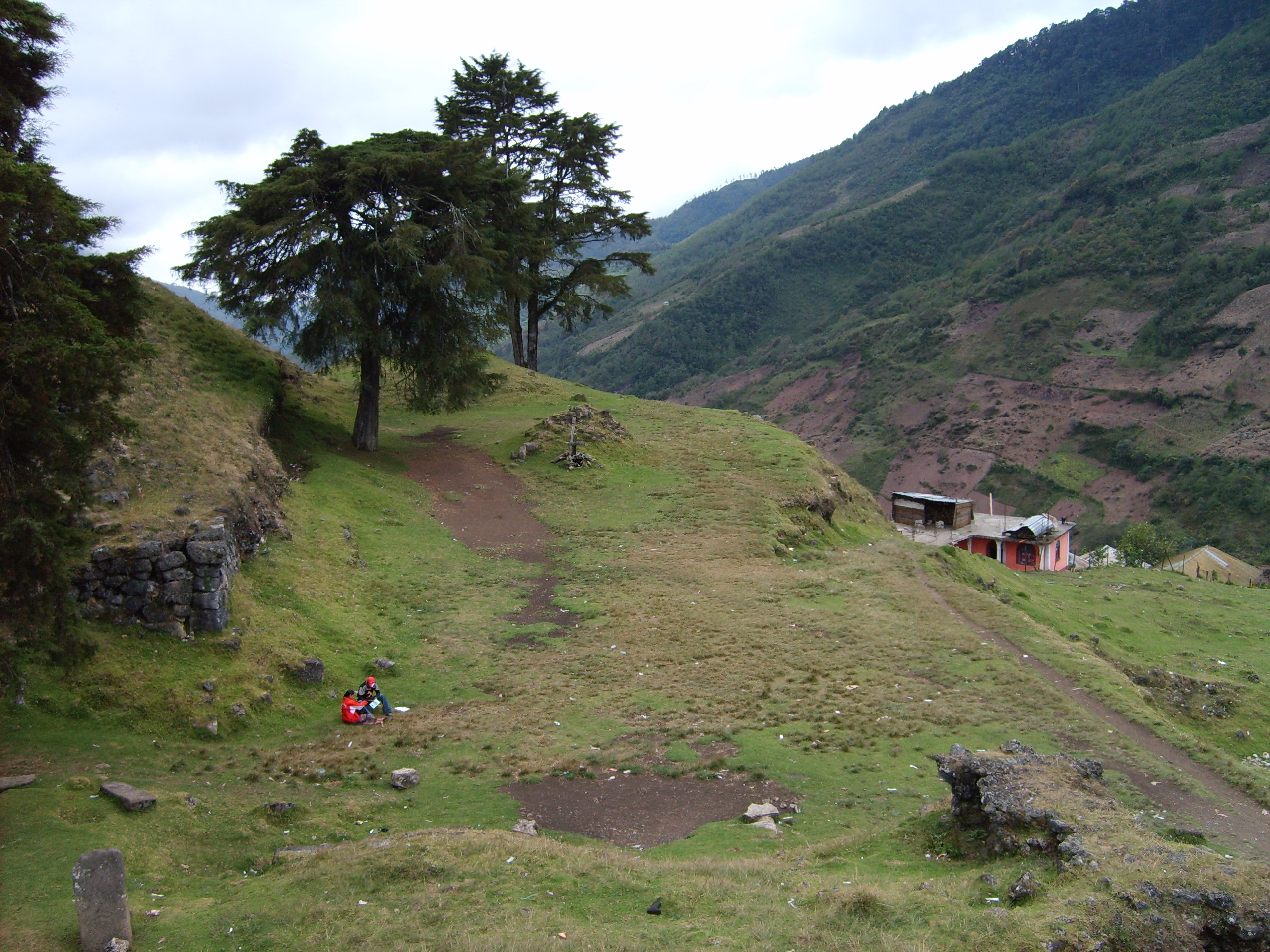
Plaza II, with Mound A at left, and the smaller Mound D with its wooden cross at centre back

This level lies immediately southeast of Level 1. A 1-to-1.5-metre (3.3 to 4.9 ft) high foundation terrace supports Mounds A and E, and has an addition 0.5-metre (1.6 ft) high step where it borders Plaza III. This terrace extends along the southeastern base of Level 1 and across the northeastern side of Level 2, where steps lead down to Plaza III. On a narrow stretch of the terrace between Plazas I and II are five plain stelae.

Plaza I is a small depression in the terrace supporting Mounds A and E, and is at the same level as the main Level 2.

Plaza II is to the southeast of Mound A.

Plaza III is to the northeast of Mound A, to which it was probably the main approach.

Mound A dominates this level. It stands approximately 10 metres (33 ft) high and measures 45 metres (148 ft) in length, aligned along the ridge. The northeastern side is badly ruined, and borders on Plaza III.

Mound B is the remains of a small structure overlooking Level 3. It is at the extreme southeast of Level 2. It is immediately southeast of Mound B.

Mound C is another small structure overlooking Level 3. It is also at the extreme southeast of Level 2. It is to the southwest of Mound B, and south of Mound A.

Mound D is a small, badly ruined mound in the middle of Plaza II. It supports a modern wooden cross.

=== Level 3 ===
Level 3 is the lowest level, and represents the natural ground level on this part of the ridge.

Mound H is a badly ruined mound, southwest of the main structures on Levels 1 and 2, an axis with Mound E and former Mound I.

Mound I was a small, badly ruined structure southwest of the principal structures on Levels 1 and 2. It lay between Mounds E and H.

== Threats ==
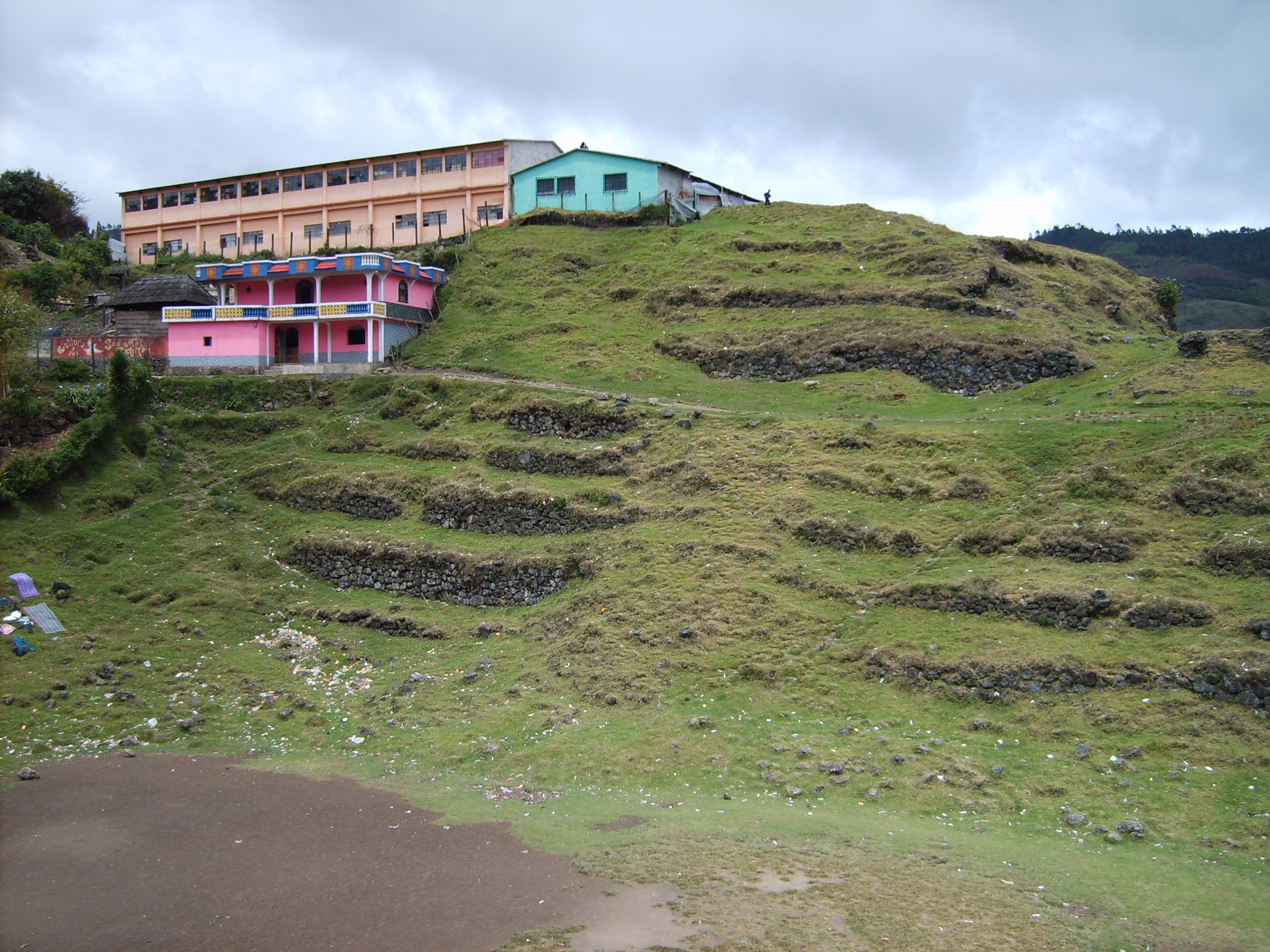
The archaeological site is threatened by the construction of new buildings

The archeological site is endangered by the urban growth of San Mateo Ixtatán, with the building of new homes taking place on top of the ruins. The demand for land for building is such that the municipal authorities lack the incentive to protect the pre-Columbian remains.

== Local traditions ==
The local Chuj Maya inhabitants of San Mateo Ixtatán consider the ruins to have been built by their ancestors, who were either killed by the Spanish invaders or fled to the hills. These ancestors are understood to have built the monumental architecture in order to be remembered by future generations, which relates well to the current understanding by archaeologists that such architecture was related to particular lineages, and was associated with ancestor worship. The modern Chuj regard the ruins as a sacred place, and it is still the focus of traditional festivities. Tojolabal inhabitants of Chiapas carry out pilgrimages to Wajxaklajun in order to perform ceremonies.

== See also ==
- Kʼatepan
