= Kʼatepan =

Ancient Mayan archaeological site in San Mateo Ixtatán, Guatemala

Coordinates: 15.835341°N 91.468562°W

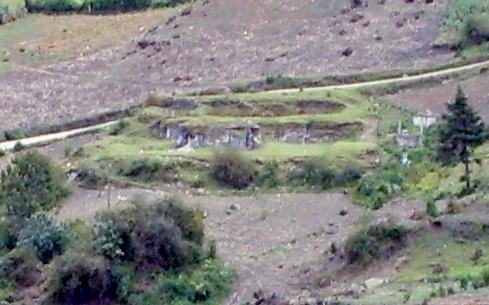
Kʼatepan, as seen from across the valley

Kʼatepan (pronounced [kʼatepan]), also known as Yolchonabʼ (pronounced [joltʃonaɓ]), is an archaeological site of the ancient Maya civilization located 1 kilometre (0.62 mi) to the east of the modern town of San Mateo Ixtatán, in the Huehuetenango Department of Guatemala. The name Kʼatepan translates as "old church", while the alternate name of Yolchonabʼ means "in the village". The site consists of a small temple plaza in front of two large terraces set against a mountainside, accessed by broad stairways. The site was first described by Guatemalan historian Adrián Recinos in 1913. Recinos considered Kʼatepan to be the most important ceremonial site in the northern Sierra de los Cuchumatanes mountains. A preliminary map of Kʼatepan was produced in 2007.

== Description ==
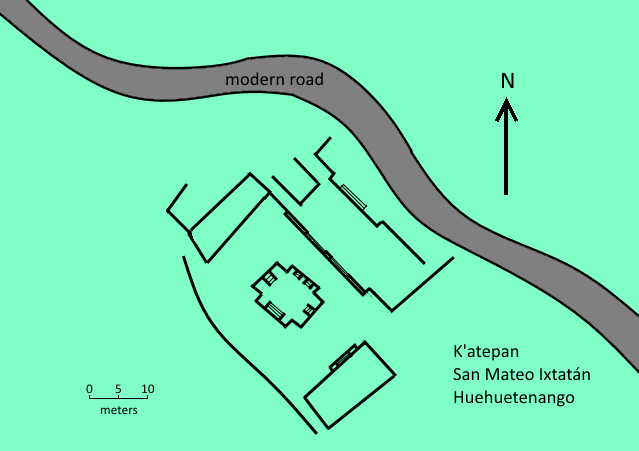
Plan of the site core

Kʼatepan possesses 19 structures clustered in six architectural groups. The main temple measures 8 by 13.5 by 2.5 metres (26.2 by 44.3 by 8.2 ft) and stands in the centre of a small plaza. Although it is located on an exposed mountainside, it is relatively well preserved. It does not appear to have been badly damaged by looting though there are some small holes on the northeastern side. The temple has suffered some damage in recent times from plant roots penetrating the masonry. A substantial portion of the southeastern corner of the temple has collapsed, revealing a substructure with finely cut stonework, perhaps belonging to its stairway. The temple was coated with various layers of stucco; the outermost layer remains intact over much of the temple exterior. When Recinos published his description in the early 20th century, photographs showed the temple in a much better state of preservation, with standing walls from the temple shrine upon its summit.

The temple is of a style typical of the Postclassic period (c. 950–1539 AD) in the Guatemalan Highlands. The northeastern side of the temple was accessed by a double stairway, with a single stairway on each of the other sides. Directly opposite the double stairway, another double stairway climbs the lower platform of the two terraces. On the southeastern side, the single stairway is matched by a single stairway in a platform opposite. The temple and the platform are not perfectly aligned, but there appears to have been an attempt to produce general symmetry.

The surveyed architecture consisting of the temple plaza and associated platforms is apparently the core of a larger group of buildings. Investigators highlighted overgrown buildings further down the mountainside, the dimensions of which suggest another temple similar in size and design to the central temple. A small platform is located up the slope to the southeast, beside a road, and there are likely to be further remains as yet undescribed.

The architectural style of the Kʼatepan temple is very similar to that of the remains of a pre-Columbian temple at Titzʼam, the nearby salt springs in the valley below, and the two sites are closely linked in local tradition.

== Folklore ==
In local tradition, the site is linked to the Tojolabal Maya, and is said to have belonged to an ancient lord. Tradition holds that Kʼatepan was the home of the Tzapaluta people, the local name for the Tojolabal, and the former name of La Trinitaria in Chiapas, in neighbouring Mexico. It is generally not considered to be sacred by the modern Chuj Maya inhabitants of San Mateo Ixtatán. The Tojolabal Maya are said to have been expelled from the area by the Chuj after a war over the local salt springs. The Tojolabal are now located in Chiapas, and they have a tradition that they originally came from the San Mateo Ixtatán region; they make yearly pilgrimages to San Mateo to pray for rain. Originally these pilgrimages were to K'atepan, but in recent times the focus has moved across the valley to San Mateo, the neighbouring ruins of Wajxaklajun, and the local salt springs. By 2013, the organisation of these traditional pilgrimages was carried out by Tzeltal Maya of La Trinitaria, but still included ethnic Tojolabal. The Tzeltal participants have no traditions concerning Kʼatepan.
