= San Sebastián Coatán =

Municipality in the Guatemalan department of Huehuetenango

Coordinates: 15°44′N 91°34′W

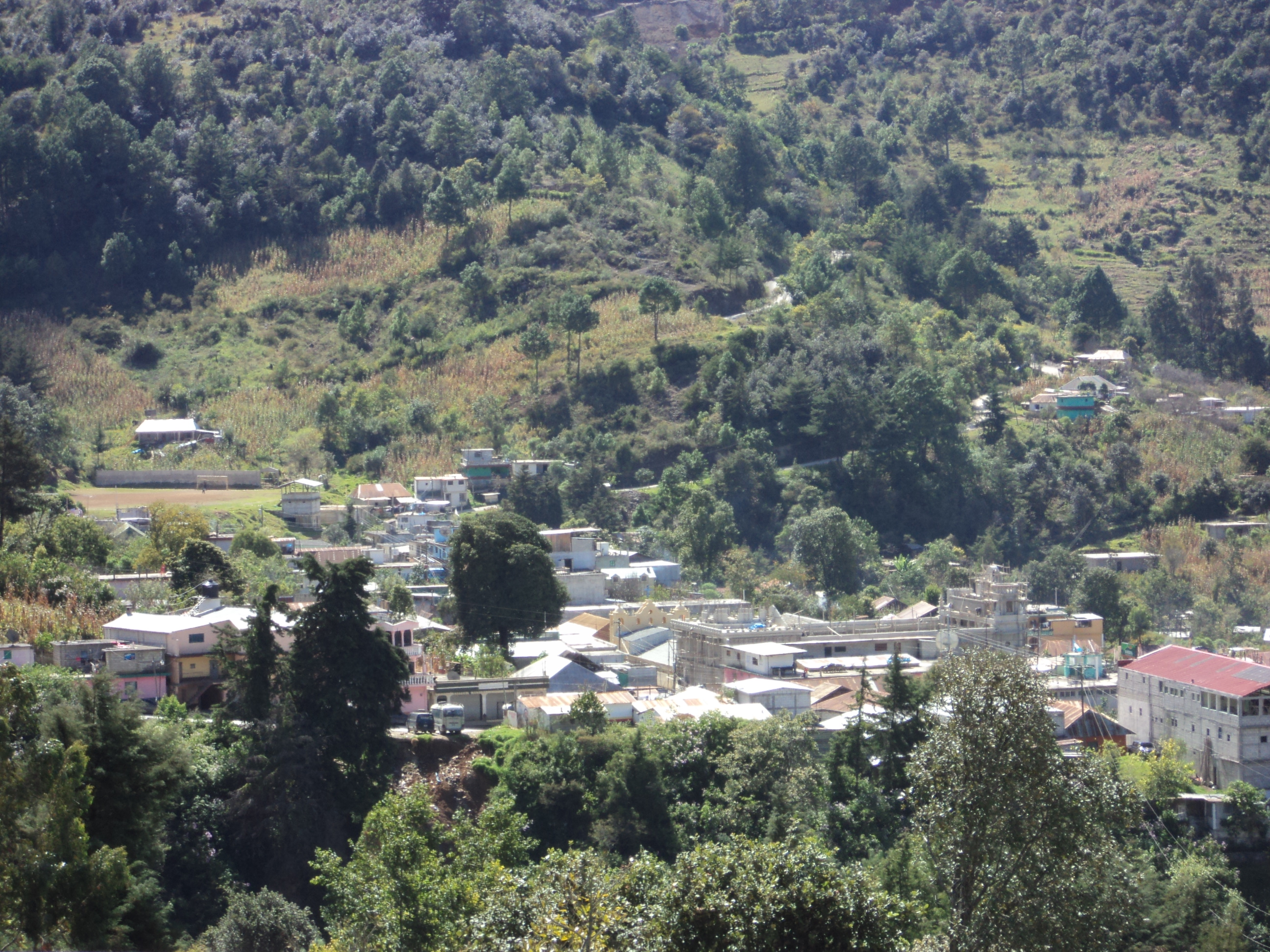
San Sebastián Coatán

San Sebastián Coatán is a municipality in the Guatemalan department of Huehuetenango.

== Municipality ==
Its territory extends 560 km^{2} (220 sq mi), is 2,350 m (7,710 ft) above sea level and has a cooler climate. It has 18,022 inhabitants who speak Spanish and Chuj. It borders San Mateo Ixtatán and Nentón to the north, San Rafael la Independencia and Santa Eulalia to the east, San Miguel Acatán to the south and Nentón to the west. Within its borders lies the archeological site called Moja'.

The town's fair is 17–20 January in honor of their patron, Saint Sebastian. Another smaller fair is on October 02 celebrating Saint Francis of Assisi.

Local Evangelical Protestants operate a radio station known as Radio Coatán, or sometimes as Radio Cultural Coatán. The station broadcasts on shortwave and can sometimes be heard in North America and Europe.
