= Mochoʼ language =

Endangered Mayan language of Chiapas, Mexico

Mochoʼ
- Motozintleco
- Qatoʼk, Mochoʼ
- Pronunciation: [mot͡ʃoʔ]
- Native to: Mexico
- Region: Eastern Chiapas (villages of Tuzatlán and Motozintla), Southern Mexico
- Native speakers: 124 (2022)
- Language family: Mayan: Qʼanjobalan–Chujean; Qʼanjobalan; Mochoʼ
- Dialects: Tuzantec
- Writing system: Latin

Official status
- Official language in: Mexico
- Regulated by: Instituto Nacional de Lenguas Indígenas

Language codes
- ISO 639-3: mhc
- 06z Tuzanteco
- Glottolog: moch1257 Mocho tuza1238 Tuzanteco
- ELP: Mocho'

Mochoʼ (known as Motozintleco in older sources) is a Mayan language spoken by the Mochoʼ people of Chiapas, Mexico. It was known as Qatokʼ (from Qa-our and Tookʼ-language: our language), although this name has not received wide acceptance among the native speakers and the language, which is known as Mochoʼ by both the Mochoʼ people and the Mexican government. Mochoʼ has a dialect called Tuzantec (Muchuʼ) spoken in Tuzantan, Chiapas. Alongside Jakaltek, Qʼanjobʼal, Chuj and Tojol-Abʼal, the Mochoʼ language is part of the Qʼanjobalan group from the western branch of Mayan languages.

With about 124 speakers as of 2020, Mochoʼ is considered an endangered language. The Tuzantec dialect is moribund, with fewer than 5 speakers as of 2011. Educational programs in Mochoʼ are helping to preserve the language among youth and the process of teaching and learning the language in indigenous schools.

== Geogaphic distribution ==
The two dialects of Mochoʼ are spoken in two different villages: the Tuzantec dialect in Tuzantán (a town near Huixtla, Chiapas), and the Mochoʼ dialect in Motozintla. Historically, the two groups descend from a single population living in the region of Belisario Domínguez about 500 years ago. According to local legend, the split and migration was caused by a plague of bats. Speakers have also been reported in the nearby towns of Tolimán, Buenos Aires, and Campana. Palosaari (2011) describes the Motozintlec dialect.

== Phonology ==
The phonology of Mochoʼ is given in the tables below, where phonemes in parentheses represent allophones or sounds that only appear in loan words.

Consonants
		Labial	Dental	Alveolo- palatal	Velar	Uvular	Glottal
Nasal		m	n	ɲ	ŋ		
Stop	plain	p	t		k	q	ʔ
Stop	glottalized	ɓ (Note: Pronounced as [ɓ̥] word-finally.)	tʼ		kʼ	qʼ	ʔ
Stop	voiced	(b) (Note: Allophone of /ɓ/ word-initially and medially.)	(d)		(g)		ʔ
Affricate	plain		ts	tʃ			
Affricate	glottalized		tsʼ	tʃʼ			
Fricative		(f)	s	ʃ	x		
Glide		w		j			
Liquid			l (r)				

Vowels
	Front	Central	Back
High	i iː		u uː
Mid	e eː		o oː
Low		a aː	

Unlike most Mayan languages, Mochoʼ is tonal, contrasting tone in long vowels in stressed syllables. Stress is regular and at the last syllable. Short vowels have level or rising pitch.

In Mochoʼ, Proto-Mayan *j [x] and *h [h] have merged to /j/ in Motozintleco, while Tuzanteco preserves this distinction.

== Orthography ==
=== Alphabet ===
According to the established in the written norm, the Mochoʼ alphabet consists of 30 letters, 25 consonants and 5 vowels that represent all the phonemes of the language. The official name of the Mochoʼ alphabet is Tsʼibtookʼ Mochoʼ.

Qʼanʼxwitii (vowel)
Mantitsʼib (Majuscule)	Lustitsʼib (Minuscule)	Bij (Name)
A	a	A
E	e	E
I	i	I
O	o	O
U	u	U

Qʼanxwitookʼ (consonant)
Mantitsʼib (Majuscule)	Lustitsʼib (Minuscule)	Bij (Name)
B	b	Ba
CH	ch	CHa
CHʼ	chʼ	CHʼa
G	g	Ga
J	j	Ja
K	k	Ka
Kʼ	kʼ	Kʼa
L	l	La
M	m	Ma
N	n	Na
Ñ	ñ	Ña
Nʼ	nʼ	Nʼa
P	p	Pa
Q	q	Qa
Qʼ	qʼ	Qʼa
R	r	Ra
S	s	Sa
T	t	Ta
Tʼ	tʼ	Tʼa
TS	ts	TSa
TSʼ	tsʼ	TSʼa
W	w	Wa
X	x	Xa
Y	y	Ya
ʼ	ʼ	Xlokʼ-aq

=== Written norm ===
The official Writing Norm of the Mochoʼ Language (In Mochoʼ: Naʼobal chu tsʼiba we tookʼ Mochoʼ, Spanish: Norma de escritura de la lengua mochoʼ) was published in 2011 by the Instituto Nacional de Lenguas Indígenas, it is mainly used for indigenous education. It established official alphabet, grammar rules and other linguistic aspects.
