= Qʼanjobalan languages =

Western Mayan language

Qʼanjobalan
- Kanjobalan–Chujean
- Geographic distribution: Mesoamerica
- Linguistic classification: Mayan: Western (Qʼanjobalan–Chʼolan); Qʼanjobalan
- Subdivisions: Qʼanjobalan proper; Chujean

Language codes
- Glottolog: kanj1261

The Qʼanjobalan a.k.a. Kanjobalan–Chujean languages are a branch of the Mayan family of Mexico and Guatemala. All Q'anjobalan languages are spoken in Chiapas, Mexico, four languages of the branch are spoken in Huehuetenango, Guatemala.

== Languages ==
- Qʼanjobʼal (Kanjobalan) proper
  - Kanjobal–Jacaltec: Akatek, Jakaltek (Poptiʼ), Qʼanjobʼal
  - Mochoʼ
- Chujean: Chuj, Tojolabal

== Distribution ==
Chujean	Chuj	Mexico and Guatemala
Chujean	Tojol-ab'al	Mexico
Q'anjob'alan-Jakaltek	Akatek	Mexico and Guatemala
Q'anjob'alan-Jakaltek	Jakaltek	Mexico and Guatemala
Q'anjob'alan-Jakaltek	Q'anjob'al	Mexico and Guatemala
Mocho'	Mocho'	Mexico
