= Motozintlecos =

Mexican indigenous people

The Motozintlecos or Mochós are an Indigenous people of Chiapas, Mexico. They speak the Mocho’ language, part of the western branch of Mayan languages. With only about 100 speakers (as of the 2010 census), the Mocho' language is in danger of extinction.

The majority of the Motozintleco community resides in Motozintla de Mendoza.
