= Tojolabal people =

Mayan subgroup

Tojolabal
Tojolab'al

Total population
- 45,000

Regions with significant populations
- Chiapas, Mexico

Languages
- Tojolabal

The Tojolabal are a Maya people of the Mexican state of Chiapas. They traditionally speak the Tojolabal language.

== Population density ==
The Tojolabal people are spread across the state of Chiapas, Mexico. Las Margaritas is believed to have the largest group of Tojolabal, with the next largest in population density being Comitán. Around the municipalities, there are 439 Tojolabal villages in which most of the population resides.

== Archaeology ==
The Tojolabal people are known for the ancient site of K'atepan, a temple plaza against a mountainside which can be accessed by large stairways.

== See also ==
- Wajxaklajun
