= Chuj language =

Mayan language spoken in Guatemala and Mexico

Chuj
- Koti'
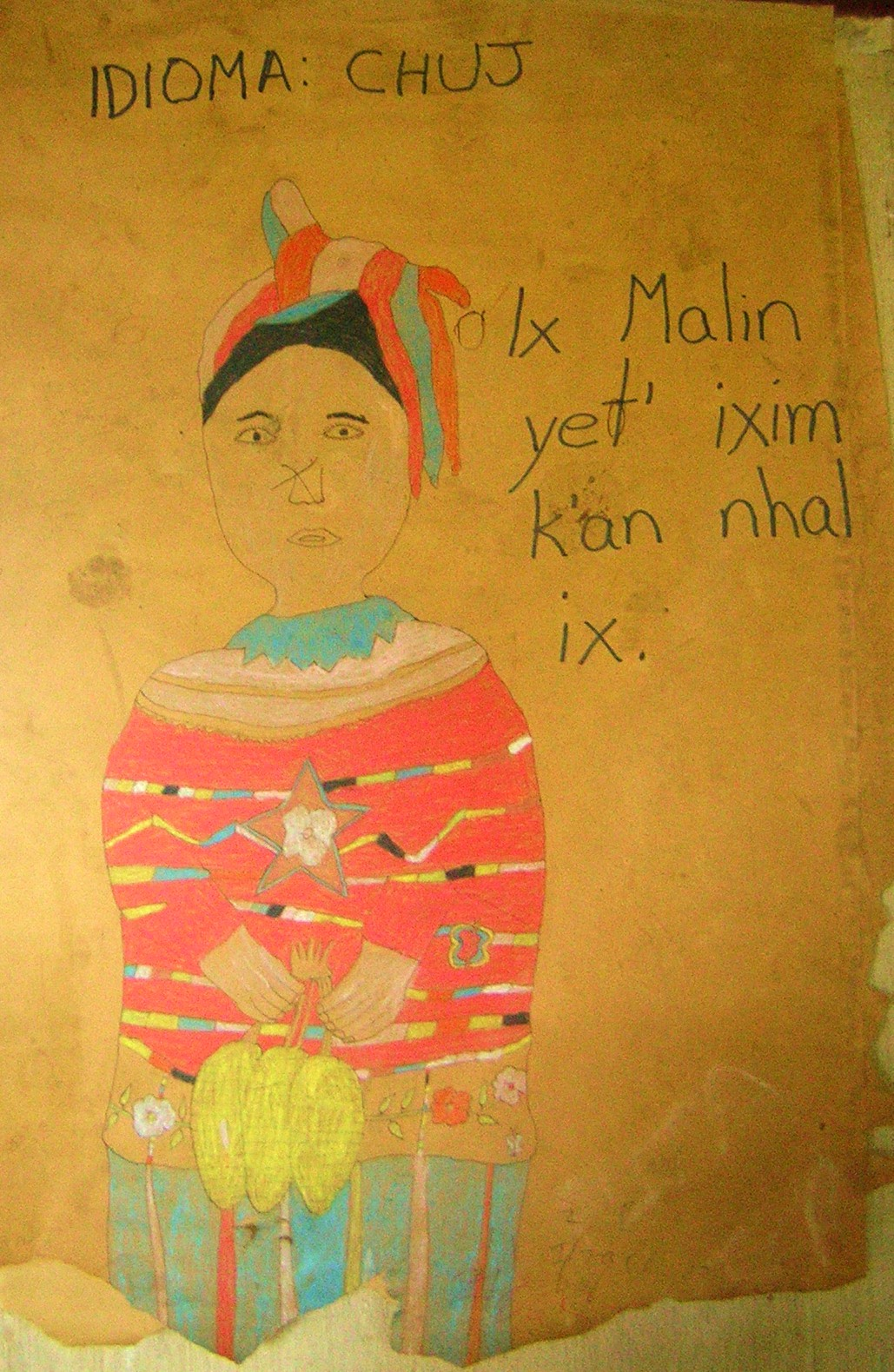
- Art with text in Chuj
- Native to: Guatemala, Mexico
- Region: Northern Huehuetenango, Chiapas
- Ethnicity: 91,400 Chuj in Guatemala (2019 census)
- Native speakers: 59,000 in Guatemala (2019 census); 4,000 in Mexico (2020 census)
- Language family: Mayan: Qʼanjobalan–Chujean; Chujean; Chuj
- Dialects: San Mateo Ixtatán; San Sebastián Coatán
- Writing system: Latin

Official status
- Recognised minority language in: Guatemala

Language codes
- ISO 639-3: cac
- Glottolog: chuj1250
- ELP: Chuj

Chuj (Spanish: [tʃux]) is a Mayan language spoken by around 40,000 members of the Chuj people in Guatemala and around 3,000 members in Mexico. Chuj is a member of the Qʼanjobʼalan branch along with the languages of Tojolabʼal, Qʼanjobʼal, Akateko, Poptiʼ, and Mochoʼ which, together with the Chʼolan branch, form the Western branch of the Mayan family. The Chujean branch emerged approximately 2,000 years ago. In Guatemala, Chuj speakers mainly reside in the municipalities of San Mateo Ixtatán, San Sebastián Coatán and Nentón in the Huehuetenango Department. Some communities in Barillas and Ixcán also speak Chuj. The two main dialects of Chuj are the San Mateo Ixtatán dialect and the San Sebastián Coatán dialect.

The Chuj language has been influenced by Spanish, and Chuj speakers have a tendency to borrow Spanish words or code-mix. It is estimated that 70% of the Chuj language is purely Chuj. There are language conservation and revitalization efforts taking place in San Mateo Ixtatán, through groups like the Academia de Lenguas Mayas de Guatemala.

== Phonology ==
=== Phonemic inventory ===
Vowels
	Front	Back
High	i	u
Mid	e	o
Low	a	

Consonants
		Labial	Alveolar		Palatal	Velar	Uvular	Glottal
Nasal		m	n			ŋ ⟨nh⟩		
Plosive/ Affricate	Plain	p	t	t͡s ⟨tz⟩	t͡ʃ ⟨ch⟩	k		ʔ ⟨ʼ⟩
Plosive/ Affricate	Glottalic		tʼ	t͡sʼ ⟨tzʼ⟩	t͡ʃʼ ⟨chʼ⟩	kʼ		ʔ ⟨ʼ⟩
Plosive/ Affricate	Implosive	ɓ ⟨bʼ⟩						
Fricative			s		ʃ ⟨x⟩		χ ⟨j⟩	
Approximant		w	l		j ⟨y⟩			
Trill			r					

== Orthography ==
Orthography	IPA	Example	Translation
a	/a/	atzʼam	salt
bʼ	/ɓ/	bʼeyi	to walk
ch	/t͡ʃ/	chich	rabbit
chʼ	/t͡ʃʼ/	chʼal	thread
e	/e/	ewi	yesterday
i	/i/	ix	woman
j	/χ/	jun	one
k	/k/	kukay	firefly
kʼ	/kʼ/	kʼatzitz	firewood
l	/l/	lolonel	word
m	/m/	much	bird
n	/n/	nun	parent
nh	/ŋ/	nhabʼ	rain
o	/o/	okʼ	foot
p	/p/	pat	house
r	/r/	retet	woodpecker
s	/s/	sak	white
t	/t/	tut	beans
tʼ	/tʼ/	tʼoy	soft
tz	/t͡s/	tzatz	hard
tzʼ	/t͡sʼ/	tzʼiʼ	dog
u	/u/	unin	child
w	/w/	winak	man
x	/ʃ/	xanhap	shoe
y	/j/	yax	green
ʼ	/ʔ/	ʼonh	avocado

The letter 'h' is conventionally used in words with initial vowels to distinguish them from words that begin with a glottal stop.

== Grammar ==
=== Verb stem morphology ===
Below is a template for the verbal stem in Chuj. Verbal predicates in Chuj appear with a status suffix: -a with transitive verbs and –i with intransitive verbs. Finite clauses inflect for Tense-Aspect, person, and number.

Verb structure

Tense/aspect/mood {Absolutive marker} {Ergative marker} {Verb root} {Status suffix}
tz- ach- in- chel- aʼ
IPFV 2SG.ABS 1SG.ERG hug TR
tzachinchela' 'I am hugging you.'

=== Non-verbal predicates ===
Non-verbal predicates are non-verbal words like adjectives, nouns, positionals, or directionals that act as the main predicate and are semantically stative. These constructions do not inflect for Tense-Aspect, but do inflect for person and number. There is no overt copula in Chuj and copula constructions are expressed through non-verbal predicates.

a ix Malin kʼaybʼum ix.
top/foc CL Maria teacher CL
Maria is a teacher.

Ay ix hin-nun niwakil ix.
top/foc CL my-mother large CL
My mother is large.

=== Person-markers ===
Chuj is an ergative-absolutive language. The subject of an intransitive verb and the object of a transitive verb are both cross-referenced with an absolutive marker, which appears in the verbal stem. The subject of a transitive verb is cross-referenced with an ergative marker in the verbal stem.

Person markers
		Ergative marker		Absolutive marker
		pre-consonantal	pre-vocalic	pre-consonantal/ pre-vocalic
3rd person	singular	hin-	w-	hin-
3rd person	plural	ko-	k-	honh-
2nd person	singular	ha-	h-	hach-
2nd person	plural	he-	hey-	hex-
3rd person	singular	s-	y-	Ø
3rd person	plural	s-... hebʼ	y-... hebʼ	hebʼ

=== Tense-Aspect ===
Chuj has four attested Tense-Aspect markers. Finite clauses inflect obligatorily for Tense-Aspect.

Tense-Aspect markers
Marker	Meaning
tz-	imperfective
ix-	perfective
lan	progressive
ol-	prospective

=== Nominal classifiers ===
Chuj nominal classifiers represent a closed class of approximately a dozen words. They specify gender for humans, and the base material for objects, such as wood (teʼ) for houses and metal (kʼen) for knives.

Nominal classifiers
Classifier	Domain
aʼ	water
anh	plant [grow from ground]
atzʼam	salt
chanh	vine
ix	female
ixim	grain
kʼak	cloth
kʼen	metal
lum	earth
nokʼ	animal
teʼ	wood
waj	male name
winh	male

Chuj nominal classifiers have two main functions: they act as articles for referential nouns, and as pronouns. They have a lexical origin, but have undergone semantic bleaching and may therefore refer to a larger semantic field than the nominals that they are derived from.

Articles for referential nouns

Hebʼ winh unin ix-s-loʼ [teʼ manzan] hebʼ winh.
PL CL.MASC child PFV-a3s-eat CL.wood apple PL CL.MASC
As for the boys, they ate the apple.

Pronouns

Ol-s-lo teʼ ix.
Prosp-b3s-a3s-eat CL.wood CL.FEM
She (Elsa) will eat it (the apple).

== Vocabulary ==
English	Chuj
One	Ju'un
Two	Cha'ab'
Three	Oxe'
Man	Winak
Woman	'Ix
Dog	Tz'i'
Sun	K'u
Moon	Chi'ich
Water	Ha'
Dog	Tz'i'
Deer	Chej
Coyote	Okes
Monkey	Maxtin
Rabbit	Tzich
Mouse	Cho
Bird	Much
Fish	Chay
Snake	Kan
Black	K'ik'
White	Sak
Red	Chak
Yellow	K'an
Blue	Ya'ax
Green	Ya'ax

=== Numbers ===
San Mateo Ixtatán	San Sebastián Coatán
Juʼun	Jun
Chaʼabʼ	Chaʼabʼ/chabʼ
Oxeʼ	Oxeʼ
Chanheʼ	Chanheʼ
Hoyeʼ	Oʼeʼ
Wakeʼ	Wakeʼ
Hukeʼ	Hukeʼ
Wajxakeʼ	Wajxkeʼ
Bʼalunheʼ	Bʼalnheʼ
Lajunheʼ	Lajnheʼ

== Sample text ==
=== A tongue twister in Chuj from San Sebastián Coatán ===
Nokʼ Xankatat yetʼ nokʼxeʼen
Xenhxni xekxni xanhxni hinbʼeyi
Xankatak xanhbʼ wekʼ a stixalu
Xchi nokʼ xankat a nokʼ xeʼen,
Xwila xwabi, xelabʼa to ojinwekla,
to jinxekla manhx ojinwekla.
