= Tojolabʼal language =

Mayan language of Mexico

Tojol-ab'al
- Tojol ab'al
- Pronunciation: [tohol aˈbal]
- Native to: Mexico
- Region: Southeast Chiapas
- Ethnicity: Tojolabal
- Native speakers: 67,000 (2020 census)
- Language family: Mayan: Qʼanjobalan–Chujean; Chujean; Tojol-ab'al
- Writing system: Latin

Official status
- Official language in: Mexico
- Regulated by: Instituto Nacional de Lenguas Indígenas

Language codes
- ISO 639-3: toj
- Glottolog: tojo1241
- ELP: Tojolabal

Tojol-ab'al is a Mayan language spoken in Chiapas, Mexico by the Tojolabal people. Tojol-ab'al is spoken, principally in the departments of the Chiapanecan Colonia of Las Margaritas, by about 70,000 people. It is related to the Chuj language.

The name Tojolabal derives from the phrase [tohol aˈbal], meaning "right language". Nineteenth-century documents sometimes refer to the language and its speakers as "Chaneabal" (meaning "four languages", possibly a reference to the four Mayan languages – Tzotzil, Tzeltal, Tojolabal, and Chuj—spoken in the Chiapas highlands and nearby lowlands along the Guatemala border).

Anthropologist Carlos Lenkersdorf has claimed several linguistic and cultural features of the Tojolabal, primarily the language's ergativity, show that they do not give cognitive weight to the distinctions subject/object, active/passive. This he interprets as being evidence in favor of the controversial Sapir-Whorf hypothesis.

The official Writing Standard of the Tojol-ab’al Language (In Tojol-ab’al: Skujlayub'il Sts'ijb'ajel K'umal Tojol-ab'al, Spanish: Norma de Escritura de la Lengua Tojol-ab’al) was published in 2011 by the Instituto Nacional de Lenguas Indígenas, used for indigenous education. It established an official alphabet, grammar rules and other linguistic aspects.

Tojol-abʼal-language programming is carried by the National Institute of Indigenous Peoples radio station XEVFS, broadcasting from Las Margaritas.

== Phonology ==
=== Consonants ===
| | | Labial | Alveolar | | Post-alv./ Palatal | Velar | Glottal |
|---|---|---|---|---|---|---|---|
| Nasal | | m | n | | | | |
| Plosive/ Affricate | voiceless | p | t | ts | tʃ | k | ʔ |
| Plosive/ Affricate | ejective | | tʼ | tsʼ | tʃʼ | kʼ | |
| Plosive/ Affricate | implosive | ɓ | | | | | |
| Fricative | | | s | | ʃ | | h |
| Tap | | | ɾ | | | | |
| Approximant | | w | l | | j | | |

- [ɾ] is mostly found in Spanish loanwords.
- Voiced stops [b, d, ɡ] are also present in Spanish loanwords.

=== Vowels ===
| | Front | Central | Back |
|---|---|---|---|
| Close | i iː | | u uː |
| Mid | e eː | | o oː |
| Open | | a aː | |

== Alphabet ==
According to the Writing Standard, the alphabet in Tojol-ab’al is officially known as Tsome sat ts'ijb'anel (sign set), it's is integrated by 28 letters, 23 consonants and 5 vowels, the order and their denomination in Tojol-ab’al are the following:

Tsome sat ts'ijb'anel
| Niwak (Majuscule) | Ch'inik (Minuscule) | Sb'i'ile' (Name) |
|---|---|---|
| A | a | Aj |
| B | b | Bej |
| B' | b' | B'ej |
| CH | ch | Chej |
| CH' | ch' | Ch'ej |
| D | d | Dej |
| E | e | Ej |
| G | g | Gej |
| I | i | il |
| J | j | Jej |
| K | k | Kej |
| K' | k' | K'ej |
| L | l | Lej |
| M | m | Mej |
| N | n | Nej |
| O | o | Oj |
| P | p | Pej |
| R | r | Rej |
| S | s | Sej |
| T | t | Tej |
| T' | t' | T'ej |
| TS | ts | TSej |
| TS' | ts' | TS'ej |
| U | u | Uj |
| W | w | Wej |
| X | x | Xej |
| Y | y | Yej |
| ' | ' | Skajnub'il |
| - | - | Ch'in sjisanil |

== Sample text ==
=== English ===
==== Article 1 ====
All human beings are born free and equal in dignity and rights. They are endowed with reason and conscience and should act towards one another in a spirit of brotherhood.

==== Article 2 ====
Everyone is entitled to all the rights and freedoms set forth in this Declaration, without distinction of any kind, such as race, colour, sex, language, religion, political or other opinion, national or social origin, property, birth or other status. Furthermore, no distinction shall be made on the basis of the political, jurisdictional or international status of the country or territory to which a person belongs, whether it be independent, trust, non-self-governing or under any other limitation of sovereignty.

=== Tojolab'al ===
==== Artikulo 1. ====
Spetsanal ja swinkil ja lu’um k’inali junxta wax jul schonjel, sok ja sijpanub’ali, ja yuj ojni b’ob’ sk’u’luk ja jas sk’ana-i ja b’as lekilali, ja yuj ja ay sk’ujoli sok ay spensari t’ilan oj yilsb’aje lek sok ja smoj jumasa.

==== Artikulo 2. ====
Spetsanal ja swinkil ja lu’um k’inali, ojni b’ob’ sk’uluk ja jas wax sk’ana-i sok sijpanub’alni ja jastal wax yala ja b’a ju’un iti, mini ma’ mas lek oj iljuk a’ma tuktukiluk ja yelawi, sok a’ma winikuk ma ixuk, cha a’nima tuktukiluk ja sk’umali, cha ja’chni ja jas wax sk’ani, sok ja spensari, ma jas tuk, ja b’a niwan chonab’ b’a’yi sok ja tsome b’a kulani, cha ja’chni a’mani me’y lek stak’in sok a’nima chikan jastal jul schonjel.

Cha ja’chni spetsanal ja swinkil ja lu’um k’inali junxtani oj ilxuka a’ma tuktukiluk ja spensari sok ja sju’unil ja jas oj b’ob’ sk’uluki, ma ama tuktukiluk niwak chonab’ ja b’a’yi, cha a’ma jauk ja b’a slujmal b’a kulani, cha a’nima jun niwan chonab’ sijpanub’alxa ma jun slujmal b’a ay k’eluman ke titoni ay b’a sk’ab’ b’a jun niwan chonab’, ma oj kaltik jun niwan chonab’ b’a mito sijpanub’aluk.
