= Nentón =

- Municipality
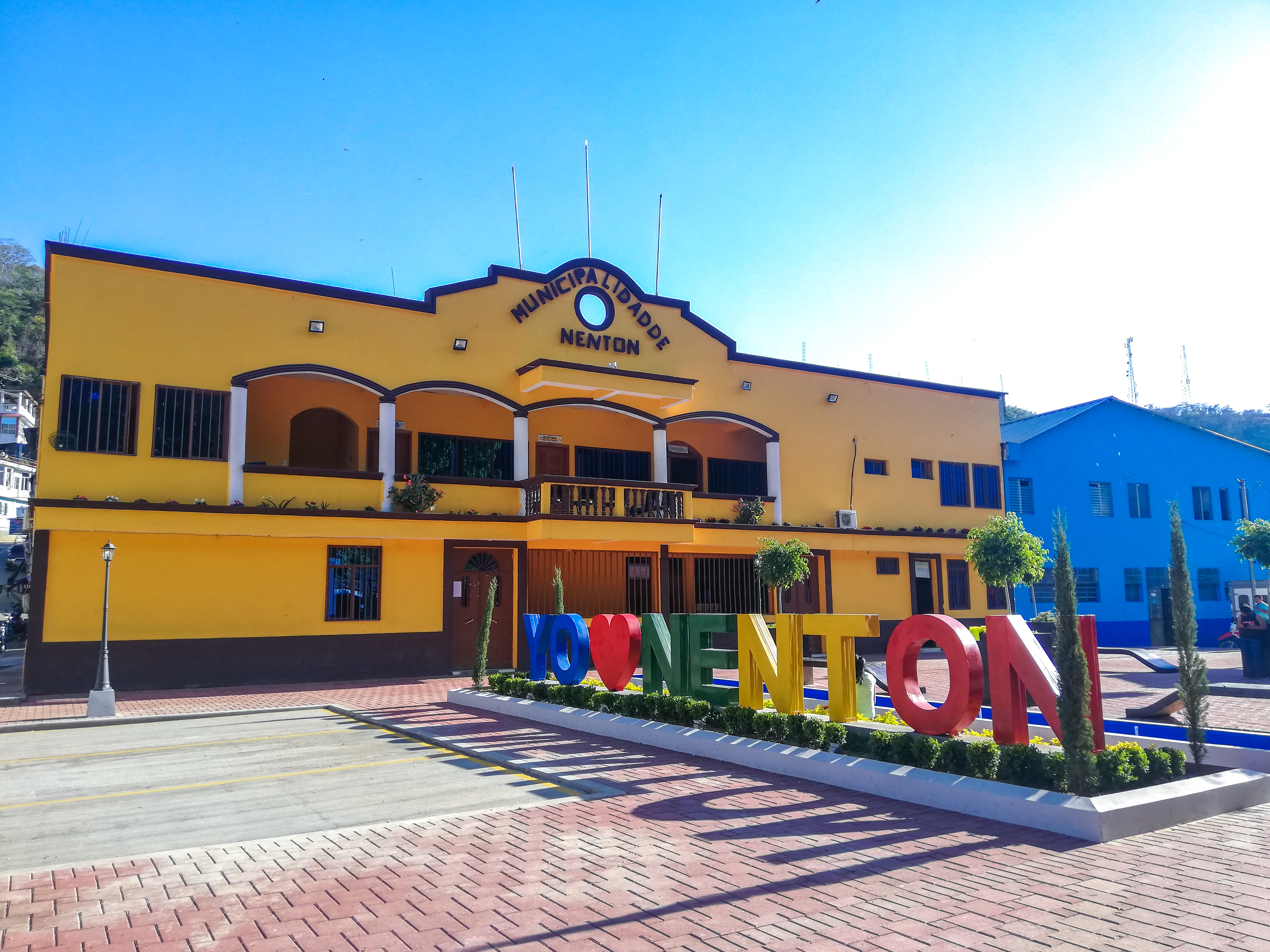
- Central park of Nentón

- Location in Guatemala
- Coordinates: 15°48′08″N 91°45′16″W
- Country: Guatemala
- Department: Huehuetenango

Area
  - Municipality: 717 km^{2} (277 sq mi)

Population (2018 census)
  - Municipality: 45,679
  - Density: 63.7/km^{2} (165/sq mi)
  - Urban: 18,606
- Climate: Cwb

Nentón is a town and municipality in the Guatemalan department of Huehuetenango. Its territory extends 717 km^{2} with a population of 45,679. It became a municipality on December 5, 1876 and was formerly known as San Benito Nentón. The population speaks Spanish and Chuj.

The Nentón town fair is from January 12 to 15 in honor of Santo Cristo de Esquipulas.

== Administrative division ==
The municipality has 13 middle size settlements (Spanish: aldeas) and 24 small size settlements (Spanish: caseríos).

Nentón human settlements
Type	List
Middle size	1. Aguacate; 2. Bili; 3. Cajtaví; 4. Canquitic; 5. El Aguacate; 6. Gracias a Dios; 7. La Nueva Esperanza; 8. Nueva Concepción; 9. Salamay; 10. Quixal; 11. Subajasum; 12. Yalambojoch; 13. Yuxquén
Small size	1. Buena Vista; 2. Chacaj; 3. Ciénega Yalcastán; 4. El Campamento Salamay; 5. El Carmen; 6. El Limón Chiquial; 7. Jom Tzalá; 8. La Unión; 9. Nueva Esperanza Chaculá; 10. Ojo de Agua; 11. Paleguá; 12. Patictenam; 13. Pocobastic I 14. Pocobastic II; 15. Río Jordán; 16. San Francisco; 17. San José Yulaurel Frontera; 18. Santa Elena; 19. Santa Rosa; 20. Tzalá Chiquito; 21. Tzalá Grande; 22. Tzojbal; 23. Xoxctac; 24. Yalcastán Buena Vista

== Archeological sites ==
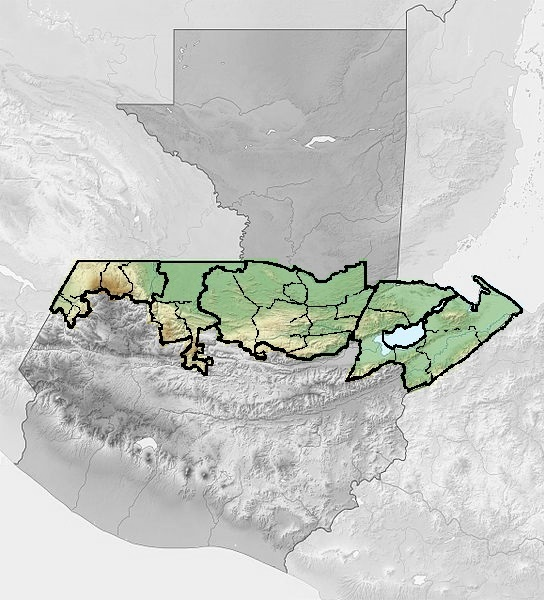
Location of Nentón in Franja Transversal del Norte

Nentón's territory includes the following sites:

Nentón archeological sites
List
1. K'atepan (Chanhk'ejelb'e)
2. Cimarrón
3. Chaculá
4. Onh (El Aguacate)
5. Ixb'u'ul (Gracias a Dios)
6. Miramar
7. Pájaros
8. Paluwa'
9. Piedra Redonda
10. K'en Santo
11. K'ixal
12. Samran (San Francisco)
13. Tres Lagunas
14. Wajxak K'annha
15. Yalanhb'ojoch

== Franja Transversal del Norte ==
The Northern Transversal Strip was officially created during the government of General Carlos Arana Osorio in 1970, by Legislative Decree 60-70, for agricultural development. The decree literally said: "It is of public interest and national emergency, the establishment of Agrarian Development Zones in the area included within the municipalities: San Ana Huista, San Antonio Huista, Nentón, Jacaltenango, San Mateo Ixtatán, and Santa Cruz Barillas in Huehuetenango; Chajul and San Miguel Uspantán in Quiché; Cobán, Chisec, San Pedro Carchá, Lanquín, Senahú, Cahabón and Chahal, in Alta Verapaz and the entire department of Izabal."

== Climate ==
Nentón has a subtropical highland climate (Köppen: Cwb).

Climate data for Nentón
Month	Jan	Feb	Mar	Apr	May	Jun	Jul	Aug	Sep	Oct	Nov	Dec	Year
Daily mean °C (°F)	12.0 (53.6)	11.9 (53.4)	13.5 (56.3)	13.9 (57.0)	13.7 (56.7)	13.9 (57.0)	13.4 (56.1)	13.3 (55.9)	13.4 (56.1)	12.7 (54.9)	12.5 (54.5)	12.6 (54.7)	13.1 (55.5)
Average precipitation mm (inches)	35 (1.4)	25 (1.0)	36 (1.4)	75 (3.0)	121 (4.8)	252 (9.9)	167 (6.6)	171 (6.7)	214 (8.4)	171 (6.7)	76 (3.0)	34 (1.3)	1,377 (54.2)
Source: Climate-Data.org

== See also ==
- Franja Transversal del Norte
- List of places in Guatemala
