= Momostenango =

- Municipality
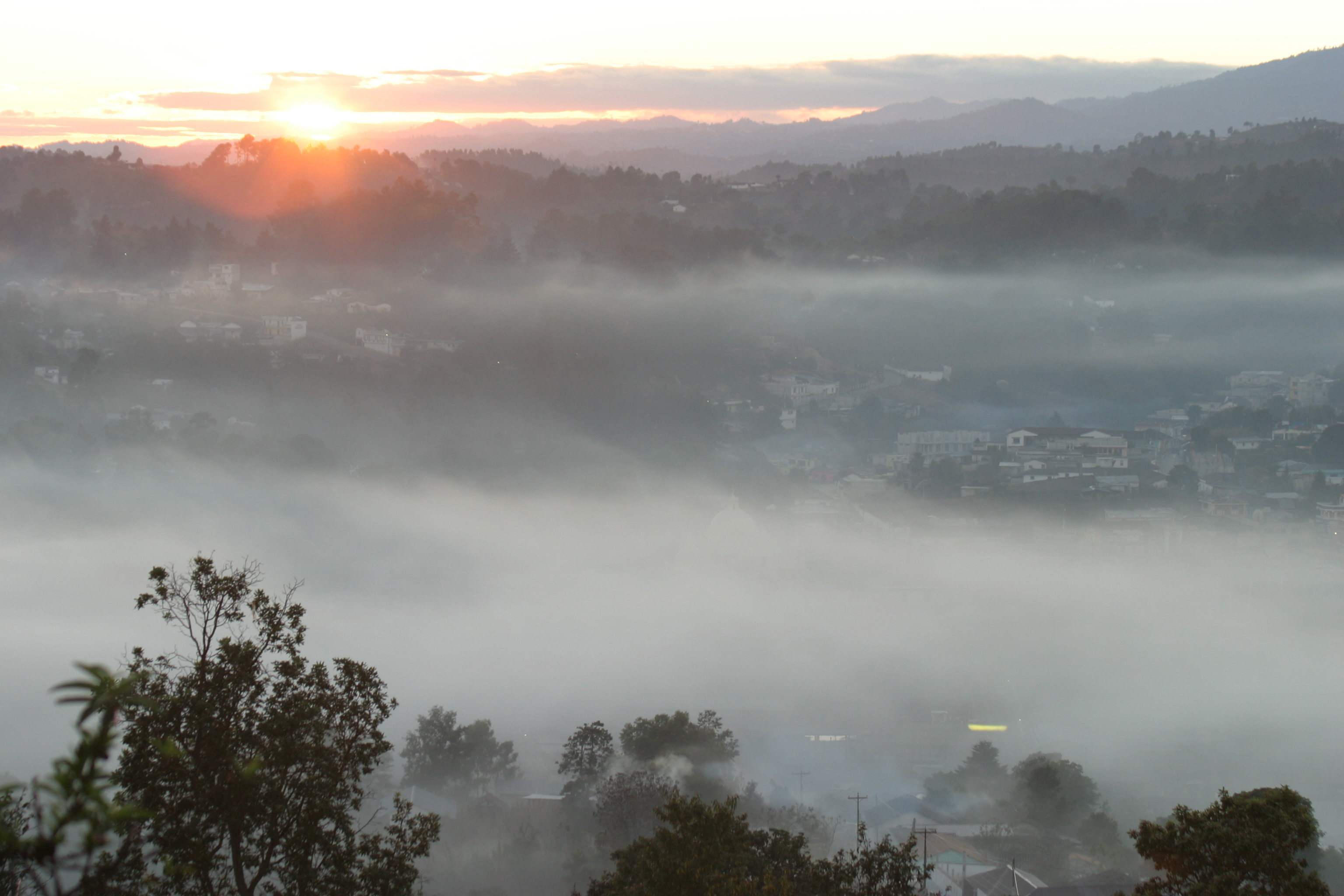
- The city in the fog

- Location within Guatemala
- Coordinates: 15°02′42.1″N 91°24′30.7″W
- Country: Guatemala
- Department: Totonicapán

Area
  - Total: 330.7 km^{2} (127.7 sq mi)

Population (June 30, 2022)
  - Total: 142,191
  - Density: 430/km^{2} (1,100/sq mi)
- Time zone: UTC−06:00
- Postal code: 08005
- Area code: 0805
- Website: Official website

Momostenango is a municipality in the Totonicapán department of Guatemala. The municipality is situated in the north-west of Totonicapán, in the western highlands of Guatemala.

== Population ==
Momostenango's population is predominantly of Maya Kʼicheʼ descent. 70% of the population lives in rural areas and most are small farmers growing maize, beans for their own consumption, and wheat.

The municipality is subdivided in the town of Momostenango, 14 villages and 169 smaller communities called caseríos or parajes.

Momostenango is the birthplace of the Maya Kʼicheʼ poet Humberto Ak'ab'al (1952–2019), who writes in Kʼicheʼ (Quiché) and in Spanish.

== Geography ==
Momostenango borders to the north with the municipalities of Malacatancito (Huehuetenango), San Bartolo and Santa Lucía La Reforma, to its south with San Francisco El Alto and the municipality of Totonicapán, to the east with Santa María Chiquimula, and to the west with San Carlos Sija (Quezaltenango).

The municipality's territory of 305 km^{2} has a mountainous topography with elevations ranging from 1800 m in the north-east, to 3300 m (Cerro Tená) to the west. The mountains on its western border are a watershed for the Salinas and Samalá river basins. Most of the 49 waterflows are tributaries of the Chixoy River in the Salinas river basin.

Like most of the central highlands, the climate is relatively cold, and is marked by a rainy season starting in mid-May, and a dry season starting in October. Yearly precipitation is around 1200 mm, except for the much drier northern part of the municipality, which receives 400–800 mm of rainfall.

== Communities ==
The Municipality of Momostenango is divided into the following principal administrative units.

=== Towns (Pueblos) ===
- Momostenango (municipal seat)

Wards (Barrios): Patizité, Santa Ana, Santa Catarina, Santa Isabel

=== Villages (Aldeas) ===
- Chinimabé
- Los Cipreses
- Nicajá
- Patulup
- Pitzal
- Santa Ana
- San Antonio Pasajoc
- San Vicente Buenabaj
- Tierra Blanca
- Tierra Colorada
- Tunayac
- Tzanjon
- Xequemeyá
- Xolajap

=== Hamlets (Caseríos) ===
- Caserio Pasuc Momostenango
- Canquixajá
- Chojonacruz
- Chonimatux
- Choxacol
- Chuiabaj
- Jutacaj
- Nimtzituj
- Pancá
- Pologua
- Pueblo Viejo
- Rachoquel
- San José Sigüila
- Xeabaj

=== Places (Parajes) ===
- Chicorral
- Pamumus
