= San Bartolo, Totonicapán =

Coordinates: 15.0844°N 91.4558°W

San Bartolo
- Municipality
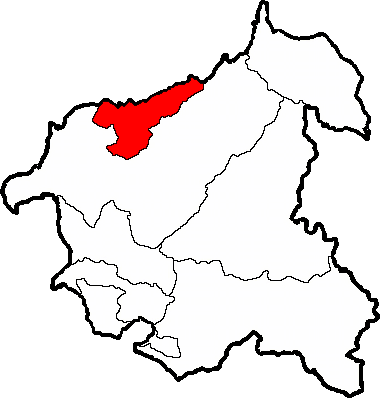
- San Bartolo within Totonicapán

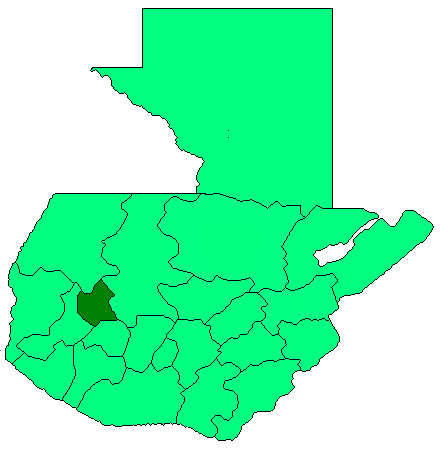
- Totonicapán within Guatemala
- Country: Guatemala
- Department: Totonicapán

Government
  - Type: Municipal

Population (2012)
  - Total: 18,590
  - Ethnicities: K'iche' Ladino
  - Religions: Catholicism Evangelicalism Maya

San Bartolo is a municipality in the Totonicapán Department of Guatemala. It is north of San Francisco El Alto and west of Santa María Chiquimula.

This hilly region is situated in rugged highlands. Long-leafed pine forests and red soil give the surroundings the flavor of the southern USA Appalachian region. The area sits atop porous limestone deposits. The principal town of San Bartolo Aguas Calientes -- St. Bartholomew's Hot Springs—is one KM from a small resort at a geothermal spring.

In early 2005, houses in a district downhill from the town began to crack. Residents could hear running water. Hurricane Stan made landfall in Guatemala in October, 2005. It became a tropical storm that hovered over the highlands for days. It dumped over 100 inches (2,500 mm) of rain. The land under 22 damaged houses dropped and slid, totally destroying them.

The Guatemalan government did not provide relief. The displaced families moved into tent-like huts, each constructed from USA-supplied tarpaulins covering a wood frame. In mid-2006, the United Methodist Church began to send US-based work teams into the area to build permanent houses for displaced families that could obtain land.
