= Nahualá =

- Municipality
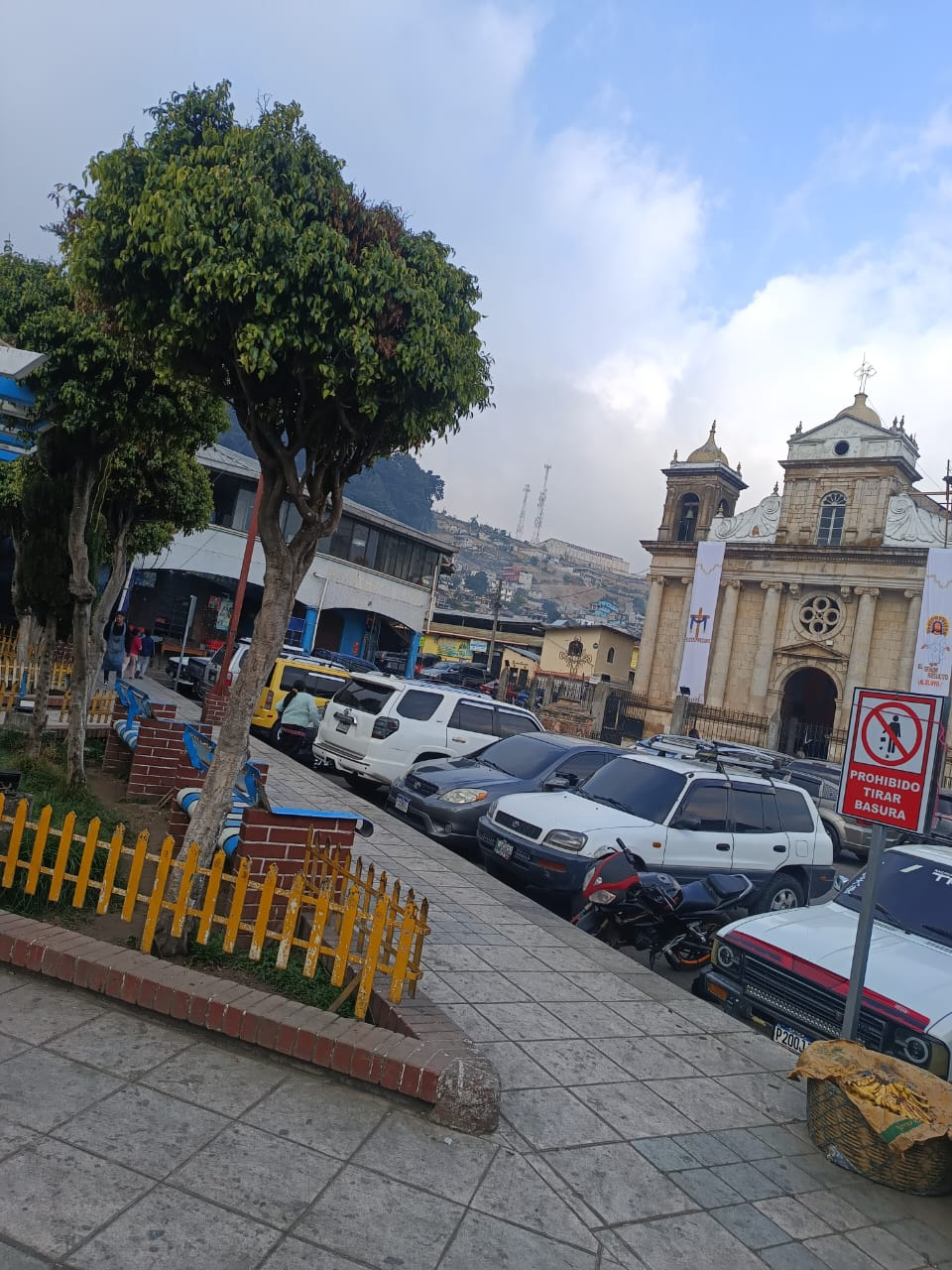

- Location in Guatemala
- Coordinates: 14°51′00″N 91°19′00″W
- Country: Guatemala
- Department: Sololá
- Municipality: Nahualá

Government
  - Type: Municipal
  - Mayor: Manuel Tzoc Carrillo

Area
  - Municipality: 218 km^{2} (84 sq mi)
- Elevation: 2,467 m (8,094 ft)

Population (census 2002)
  - Municipality: 51,939
  - Density: 238/km^{2} (620/sq mi)
  - Urban: 17,174
  - Ethnicities: Kʼicheʼ Ladino
  - Religions: Catholicism Evangelicalism Maya religion
- Climate: Cwb
- Website: https://web.archive.org/web/20110607202934/http://www.inforpressca.com/nahuala/

Nahualá (Spanish pronunciation: [nawaˈla]) is a municipality in the Sololá department of Guatemala. The town is sometimes known as Santa Catalina Nahualá in honor of the town's patron saint, Saint Catherine of Alexandria, but the official name is just "Nahualá". Formerly, the town's name was written Nagualá, and earlier transcriptions of the name in colonial documents include Nauala, Niguala, Niuala, and Navala.

Nahualá or Nawala' is also the Kʼicheʼ (Quiché) language name for the Nahualate River, which is called Niwala' in the local Nahualá dialect. The river has its source in the north of the township of Nahualá, and flows through the center of the town's cabecera ("head-town").

Nahualá is the location of radio station Nawal Estereo, the Internet-accessible modern successor to the station La Voz de Nahualá, which was founded in Nahualá with the assistance of Roman Catholic clerics from the Diocese of Helena Montana in the 1960s. Nowadays, the station broadcasts primarily in the Kʼicheʼ language, with some broadcasts also done in Kaqchikel and Spanish.

== Meaning of the name ==
Local residents translate the name Nahualá roughly as "enchanted waters," "water of the spirits," and "magical water(s)," and they often object to the common Spanish translation of the name as agua de los brujos ("water of the shamans"). Scholars have typically argued that the name Nahualá derives from a compound of the Nahuatl term nagual or nahual (pronounced NA-wal), meaning "magician"(and related to terms for clear or powerful speech) and the Kʼicheʼ root ja', meaning "water". However, the loanword nawal, which entered the Mayan languages about a thousand years ago, came to denote "spirit[s]" or "divine co-essence[s]", as well as "shaman[s]" in Kʼicheʼ. Some Maya linguists have argued apocryphally that the "true" name should be Nawalja' or Nawal-ja', disregarding that the word ja' is regularly apocopated at the ends of words — especially toponyms — not only in Kʼicheʼ, but also in related Mayan languages. Those who promote the neologisms Nawalja' and Nawal-ja' also ignore that the pronunciation of the neologisms is inconsistent with the pronunciation in sixteenth-century Kʼicheʼ — and Kaqchikel-Mayan recorded in several early colonial manuscripts written in Latin orthography by members of the native nobility.

For example, the sixteenth-century Título Yax mentions a Late Post-classic Period site called "navala" (or "nauala"), located due south of the Yax territory in San Miguel Totonicapan. Although a few scholars formerly argued that a similarly-named site mentioned in the sixteenth-century Annals of the Kaqchikel corresponds to the modern community of Nahualá and numerous texts by development, tourism, and political organizations repeat that claim, it may actually correspond to a pre-colonial Nahua-, Kʼicheʼ- and Tz'utujil-speaking community located some 20 kilometers to the south: San Juan Nahualá or San Juan Nagualapan (later annexed as a ward of the departmental capital of San Antonio Suchitepéquez). Nonetheless, the Kaqchikel Annals do mention numerous sites around and within the township, including the hill, Chwi' Raxon, located in the center of the modern cabecera. One of the earliest mentions of Nahualá as a place in the highlands occurs in one of the sixteenth-century Kaqchikel-language Xpantzay Títulos, which mentions a site called, "chohohche niguala" which is a modern canton of the cabecera of Nahualá: Chojojche' (Chojo'j Chee' = "Dry/Rattling Trees";Cho Joj Chee' = "Before [the] Crow Tree").

Several other sixteenth and early seventeenth-century titles in Spanish and Kʼicheʼ mention Nahualá either directly (as "navala" or "nauala") or obliquely, in terms of the landmarks of the community. The Título de Totonicapán mentions Siija (a Late Post-Classic fortress settlement located atop a hill of the same name, 12 kilometers west of the central plaza of Nahualá) and Pa Raxk'im ("in the green bunchgrass/thatch", the name of the mountain chain that envelops most of the township's highland territory, as well as a Nahualeño canton and village of the same name that is the second most distant canton from the central plaza), for example. Other Nahualeño sites mentioned in that text and other early colonial chronicles include Chi Q'al[i]b'al ("at the throne" a site located near Siija and Chwi'/Cho Poop Ab'aj ("Above/At [the] Reed-mat Stone[s]," sites located northeast of the main town, along the pre-colonial road that became part of El Camino Real during the Spanish period), both of which are mentioned in the Anales de los Cakchiqueles). Other local sites mentioned in títulos include Chwi' Raxon or Pa Raxon ("above/at the cotinga/verdure/green feathers/wealth," the mountain in the center of the township's head town), Xajil Juyub', Pa Tz'itee', Chwi' Patan, and others.

== History ==
Despite early references to the community, foreign scholars and many Mayas themselves have ironically tended to claim that the community was only founded in the second half of the nineteenth century, promoting particularly apocryphal interpretations of local legends.

Nahualá was settled at least as early as the Pre-Classic Period. Archaeologist John Fox, who conducted archaeological surveys in the area during the 1970s, identified structures from the Pre-Classic, Classic, and Post-Classic Periods. Grinding stones dated to as early as 500 BCE found in archaeological sites around Quetzaltenango were likely manufactured near the cabecera of Nahualá, where residents still mine volcanic basalt and carve grinding stones that are sold throughout Guatemala's western highlands.

== Population ==
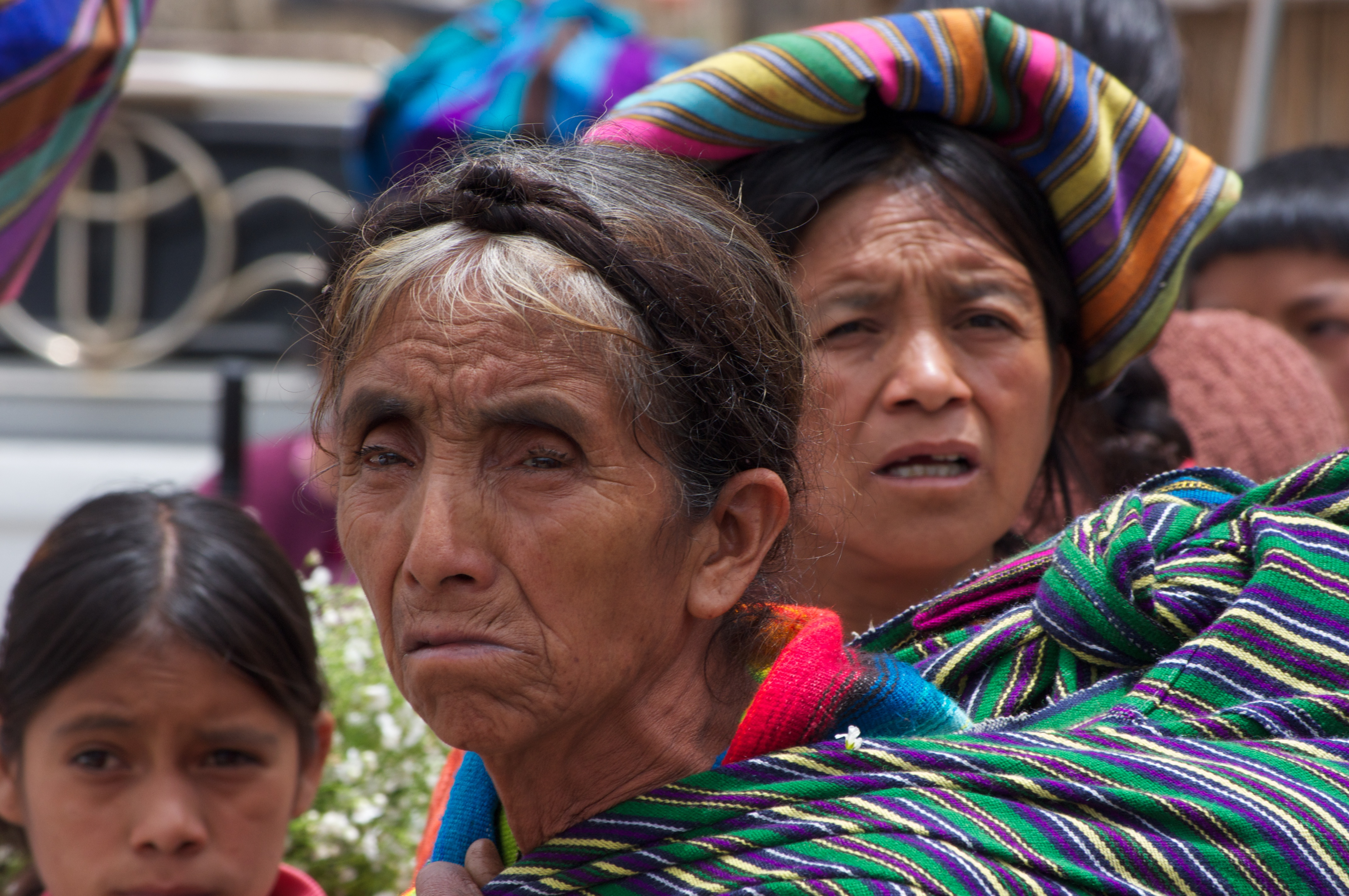
Quiche Mayan Women to Nahualá market

Nearly the entire population of the municipality is made up of ethnic Kʼicheʼ Maya who speak the Kʼicheʼ language. The population of the township is estimated to be between 50,000 and 85,000 individuals, about 10% of whom live in the head-town. Statistics vary widely because much of the township's territory and several large villages are also claimed by Nahualá' sister township, Santa Catarina Ixtahuacán.

== Land conflict ==
Officially, according to the 1779 título of Santa Catarina Ixtahuacán, Nahualá and Santa Catarina Ixtahuacán share their territory according to ancient custom (mancomunado). Today, the vast territory of the two municipios covers 218 square kilometers, about 2/3 of which is under the control of Nahualeños (or AjNawala'iib'), the "people of Nahualá". Disputes between the two towns have been common, especially since 1999, when the government of Guatemala arranged for the cabecera of Santa Catarina Ixtahuacán to be moved to the site of Chwi' Patan (nicknamed "Alaska" by a North American Catholic priest who worked in Nahualá during the 1960s) within Nahualá's territory, after the original cabecera of Ixtahuacán in a remote piedmont site was damaged by Hurricane Mitch in 1998.

Officials of the national government negotiated a treaty between the mayors of Nahualá and Ixtahuacán to allow for the re-location of Ixtahuacán's cabecera. However, residents of Ixtahuacán occupied the land in question early, before the treaty was completely negotiated, before the land had been surveyed, and before any compensation had been paid to the town of Nahualá and to the private owners of land in the area. Several Nahualeños were killed and injured by Ixtahuacanecos during conflicts that resulted from Ixtahuacán's precipitous occupation of the Chwi' Patan, which many Nahualeños consider a theft. The national government and the elected local governments or Nahualá and Ixtahuacán subsequently agreed to a modification of the original agreement, but compensation has still not been paid completely. Many Nahualeños refuse to accept the agreement, arguing that neither the general population nor Nahualá's local elders (known as principales in Spanish and as ri'j'laab' in Kʼicheʼ) have been given an opportunity to approve the treaty, even though both traditionally hold a higher authority than the elected local officials (such as the town mayor). Nahualeños insist that Ixtahuacanecos have been increasing the size of Nueva Ixtahuacán by illegally seizing farmland from Nahualeños living near the settlement. They also report that Ixtahuacanecos have repeatedly harassed Nahualeño farmers, blocked their access to fields, and destroyed their crops and sheds in the area of Chwi' Pataan.

Since 1999, the government of the Republic of Guatemala has repeatedly attempted to resolve the conflict between the communities by fixing a border between their respective territories, but its efforts have been thwarted not only by continuing confrontations and land-invasions, but also by a misunderstanding of the complexity of indigenous systems of land-use and property.

== Linguistic Affiliation ==
The principal language of the town is Kʼicheʼ. Although a growing portion of the township is bilingual in Spanish or castellano, potentially 30% of adults do not speak this national language of Guatemala. Inability to speak Spanish does not always mean that residents are "monolingual." Many local residents, particularly those engaged in trade and those living in the far west and in the far south of the township also speak the closely related Kaqchikel and Tz'utijil languages. In addition, a sizeable proportion of the township communicates in an indigenous natural sign language, though many deny linguistic competence. Locals consider the local sign language to be a variety of a widespread (and apparently ancient) language complex that they call Meemul Ch'aab'al or Meemul Tziij, literally "mute language(s)." The incidence of congenital or early-onset deafness within the township is very high. The incidence within the cabecera is over 10 times higher than the average worldwide incidence.

Since the 1970s, numerous linguists have produced studies of the Kʼicheʼ dialect of Nahualá, believing that it was a particularly conservative dialect in terms of phonology and lexicon. Some indigenous Mayas trained linguists have even advocated that the official Kʼicheʼ alphabet used by the Academia de Lenguas Mayas de Guatemala (ALMG) should reflect the phonology of the Nahualá. The dialect of Nahualá preserves sounds that have been lost in other Kʼicheʼ communities, including the Kʼicheʼ towns that are most associated with the administration of the pre-colonial Kʼicheʼ kingdom, such as Q'uma'rka'aaj (now Santa Cruz del Quiché) and Chwi' Meq'ina' (San Miguel Totonicapán). Nahualá's local dialect preserves an ancient Proto-Mayan distinction between five long vowels (aa, ee, ii, oo, uu) and five short vowels (a, e, i, o, u). It is for this conservative linguistic feature that Guatemalan and foreign linguists have actively sought to have the language called "Kʼicheeʼ," rather than Kʼicheʼ or Quiché.

Unlike the most prominent Kʼicheʼ dialects, the Nahualá dialect of Kʼicheʼ also has a phoneme /h/ and a phoneme /ŋ/, both of which occur only at the ends of words. Linguists have established firmly that the /h/ is a reflex of a proto-Mayan */h/. Linguists have not thoroughly investigated the origin of the /ŋ/ phoneme, which occurs only in a small number of words, and therefore is not believed to have enough "phonemic weight" to deserve official recognition.
