= Humberto Akʼabal =

Guatemalan poet (1952–2019)

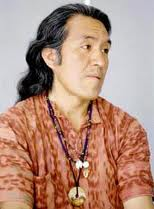
- Born: October 31, 1952; Momostenango, Totonicapán, Guatemala
- Died: January 28, 2019 (aged 66); Guatemala City, Guatemala
- Other names: Humberto Akʼabʼal, Humberto Akabal
- Occupation: Poet

Humberto Akʼabal, also Akʼabʼal or Akabal (31 October 1952 – 28 January 2019), was a Kʼicheʼ Maya poet from Guatemala. Akʼabʼal wrote in his native language of Kʼicheʼ, and then translated his poetry into Spanish. With the translations of his works into numerous languages and international recognition, Akʼabʼal is considered to be "the most renowned Maya K'icheʼ poet" in the world and one of the best known Guatemalan writers in Europe and Latin America.

== Early life ==
Akʼabʼal was born in 1952 in Momostenango, Totonicapán. His formal education ceased at age twelve, when he left school to help financially support his family. He worked in his village as a shepherd and weaver, until leaving to find work in Guatemala City as a street vendor and porter. Despite his grandfather's cautions that “books can make you lose your mind,” Akʼabʼal decided to venture into the world of poetry. His mother actually served as a source of support and influence in this choice, as she "planted in [him] an interest in the word" as a way to "continue [his] elders' tradition."

== Career ==
=== Translations ===
Akʼabʼal originally began writing his poetry in Spanish, "because he was 'illiterate' in his own mother tongue," but eventually started to write in Kʼicheʼ in the 1980s. Despite the fact that his own Spanish translations made his works available to a wider audience, Akʼabʼal was unable to find a publisher interested in printing his Kʼicheʼ work until 1993.

Since gaining popularity, Akʼabʼal's poetry has been translated into many different languages, including French, English, Estonian, Scots, German, Japanese, Dutch, Portuguese, Vietnamese, Hebrew, Hungarian, Arabic, and Italian.

=== Reception ===
Many scholars have praised Akʼabʼal's work as an expression of his indigenous tradition. Literary critic Carlos Montemayor said that "Writers like Ak'ab'al… require us to penetrate into that other reality that we do not know, understand that this culture, that this indigenous soul lives and breathes in our own reality at the same time as our time, with the same life as our life, loving and understanding the same continent that we love but do not understand." In describing Ak'bal's work, Spanish poet Antonio Gamoneda wrote: "I remain seriously impressed by Ak'abal's poetry, by its essential simplicity, by the elemental sacredness within which pulsating words reveal deeds, things, and directly natural beings." Chilean historian Miguel Rojas Mix wrote that "Akʼabal sings like the birds, speaks K'iche' Maya, and thinks as we'd wish most men thought."

== Awards ==
Akʼabʼal has been given many awards and honors from around the globe, including:

- (1993) the Quetzal de Oro from the Guatemalan Association of Journalists.
- (1995) a Diploma Emeretissimum from the Humanities faculty of University of San Carlos of Guatemala.
- (1997) the Swiss Blaise Cendrars prize.
- (1998) the Premio Continental Canto de América UNESCO prize.
- (2004) the "Pier Paolo Pasolini" international poetry prize.
- (2005) a Chevalier (Knight) membership of the Order of Arts and Letters (Ordre des Arts et des Lettres) from the French Ministry of Culture.
- (2006) the Guggenheim Fellowship by the John Simon Guggenheim Memorial Foundation, N.Y. USA.
- (2010) the dedication of the International Book Fair of Le Mans, France.
- (2017) the “Reconcimiento a la trayectoria” diploma from the state of Campeche, Mexico.

Akʼabal's book Guardián de la caída de agua (or "Guardian of the Waterfall" in English) was named book of the year by Association of Guatemalan Journalists and in 1993 received their Golden Quetzal award. In 1995 he received an honorary degree from the Department of Humanities of the Universidad de San Carlos de Guatemala. In 2004 he declined to receive the Guatemala National Prize in Literature because it is named for Miguel Ángel Asturias, whom Akʼabal accused of encouraging racism. He said Asturias' 1923 essay The Social Problem of the Indian, "Offends the indigenous peoples of Guatemala, of which I am part." The young Asturias proposed a program of eugenics —focused on the assimilation of Guatemala's Indians into its mestizo (in local usage “ladino”) population— as a remedy to the ills of the Guatemalan nation, a process he would promote by encouraging European immigration.

== Selected works ==
- (1993) Guardián de la caída de agua ("Guardian of the Waterfall" in English)
- (1999) Poems I Brought Down from the Mountain
- (2000) Con los ojos despues del mar (Vado ancho)
- (2001) Ovillo De Seda
- (2004) Chʼanalik
- (2005) Entre patojos / Among patojos
- (2010) Drum of Stone

== Personal life ==
After starting his career as a poet, Akʼabʼal moved back to his village. He lived in Momostenango, where he focused solely on his writing. He married Mayulí Bieri, with whom he had a son, Nakil Ak’abal Bieri.

Akʼabʼal died in a Guatemala City hospital on 28 January 2019.

== Sources ==
- "Humberto Ak´abal" (in Spanish). Ministerio de Cultura y Deportes. 2005-05-31. Archived from the original on February 14, 2006.
- "Humberto Akʼabal - Words Without Borders". Words Without Borders. Retrieved 2018-11-11.
- "Humberto Akʼabal (poet) - Guatemala - Poetry International". www.poetryinternationalweb.net. Retrieved 2018-11-11.
