= Santa Catarina Ixtahuacan =

Coordinates: 14°48′N 91°22′W

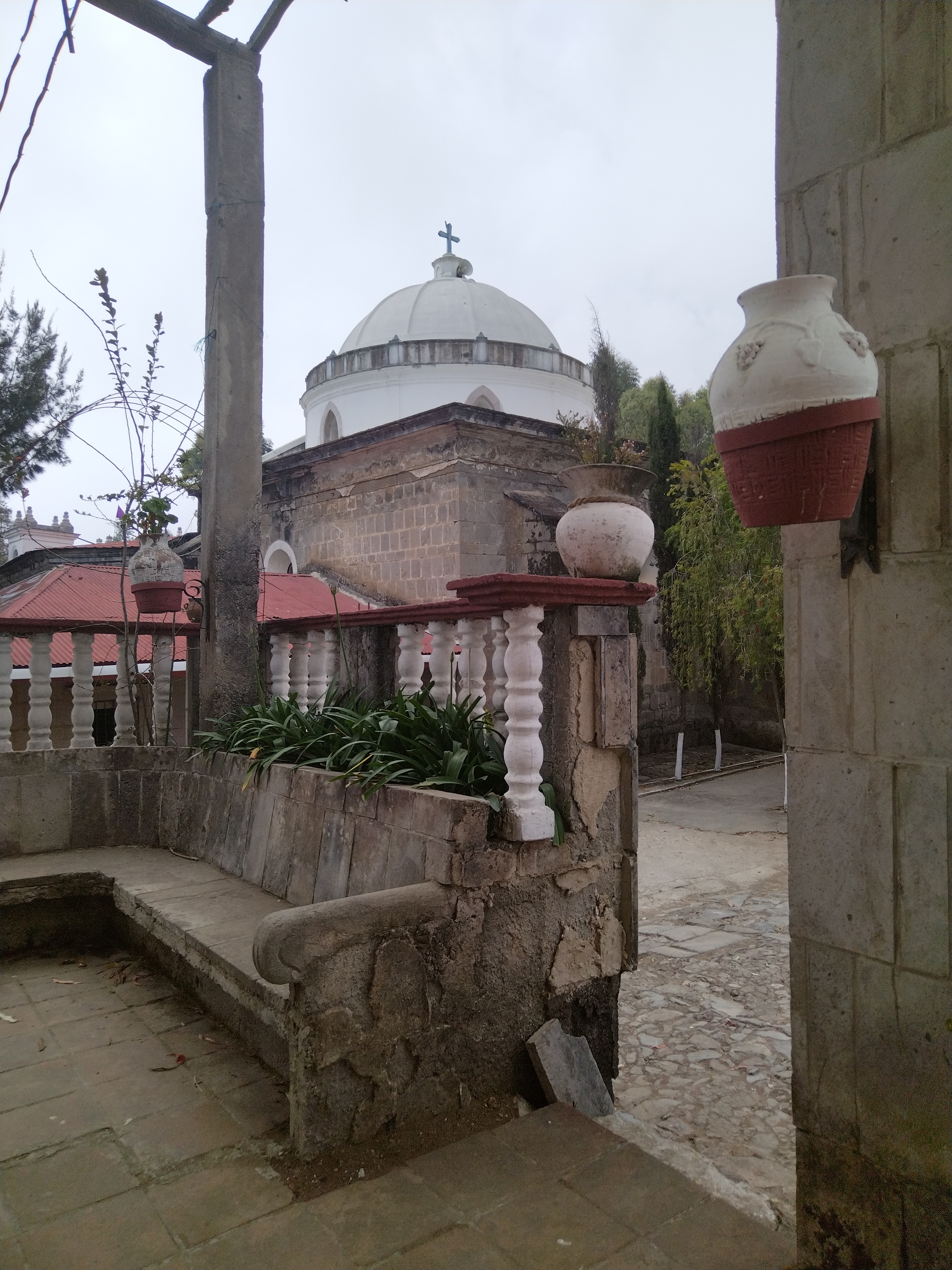
Iglesia colonial de Antigua Santa Catarina Ixtahuacán, parroquia de Santa Catalina Alejandría, Diócesis de Sololá-Chimaltenango.

Santa Catarina Ixtahuacan is a municipality in the Sololá department of Guatemala. It is located at about 2,300 metres (7,500 ft) in altitude in the steep mountains of the Sierra Madre range, descending from the western highlands to the southern coastal plain. The indigenous language is Kʼicheʼ. The town experienced large landslides during hurricane Mitch (1998); a year after this catastrophe, many residents moved to higher ground and founded the village of Nueva Santa Catarina Ixtahuacan, in territory called Chwi Pataan or “above the responsibility/duty,”within the independent township of Nahualá, and with private land plots owned principally by Nahualeños prior to 2005.

Ixtahuacanecos have claimed since at least 2000 that they had only re-settled highland territory that Ixtahuacan had owned since time immemorial, and where they claim Ixtahuacaneco ancestors had lived prior to the Spanish Invasion. Nonetheless, the Título Cristobal Ramirez, a land title written in Totonicapan in the 16th century, makes clear that the entire highland area south of Totonicapan, including Chwi Pataan, belonged to the "navalak tak vinak" (or "spirited / magical people") of Nahualá, who are identified as Kaqoj Tamub’ sub-nation of the Kʼicheʼ. The Kaqoj (lit. 'red lion') belonged to a different parcialidad from that which controlled Viejo Ixtahuacan prior to the Spanish invasion, according to paragraph 39 of the Annals of the Cakchiquels, which identifies the people living bear the mountain Kaqix Kan, which rises above Ixtahuacan Viejo, as "Iqomaq'i'", a name that surely corresponds to the Ekomaq' Tamub' sub-nation, who lived in the valley south of Nahualá, among other places.
