= Prudencio Cózar =

Spanish military officer and magistrate (1760 - 1824)

Prudencio de Cózar
- Born: c. 1760 Alcázar de San Juan, Ciudad Real
- Died: 6 April 1824 (aged 63–64) Quetzaltenango, Guatemala
- Allegiance: Spanish Empire (1780–1821); Mexican Empire (1821–1823); Central America (1823–1824)
- Spouse: Matilde Molina Barberena

Prudencio de Cózar (c. 1760 – 6 April 1824) was a Spanish military officer and magistrate active in Guatemala during the late 18th and early 19th century.

== Biography ==
Prudencio de Cózar was the firstborn legitimate son of Juan Antonio de Cózar and María Antonia Beldengullo, both of whom were members of hidalgo families in Ciudad Real, Spain. He was born sometime around 1760 and began his military career at the age of 16.

=== Military career ===
Cózar began his military career as a cadet in the Saboya infantry regiment. He was promoted to lieutenant shortly before being transferred along with his regiment to the Kingdom of Guatemala in 1780. Here he would participate in the ongoing war against Great Britain, taking part in the Battle of Roatán.

After the end of the war with Great Britain, he was assigned to the dragoon unit of Guatemala City and was later responsible for training and organizing militia regiments in Sacatepéquez, Verapaz, Totonicapán, and Tuxtla.

He would later be promoted to corregidor of Quetzaltenango in 1789 and serve as such until 1802. After serving as corregidor of Quetzaltenango, he would serve as Alcalde mayor for the neighboring province of Totonicapán until 1811.

Cózar's tenure as corregidor and alcalde were marked by institutional and cultural development in the region. He was responsible for establishing schools in rural indigenous areas. He was also noted for his fair treatment of the indigenous and ladino sectors of society, creating an alliance between K'iche' and criollo elite in Quetzaltenango.

In 1811, Cózar was responsible for recruiting and training a force that would cross the border between the Kingdom of Guatemala and New Spain in 1813, fearing advances from the Mexican rebel Mariano Matamoros into the kingdom after the fall of Antequera to the rebels. The Guatemalan expeditionary force would be defeated and routed by the rebels in battle, but Matamoros would be unable to pursue his victory into an invasion of the kingdom.

Cózar would be recalled as corregidor of Quetzaltenango in 1819 after the previous position holder retired. The following year he would lead an expeditionary force to Totonicapán in order to put down a rebellion headed by the local indigenous towns of the province.

After the independence of Guatemala in 1821, Cózar maintained loyalty to his adoptive country and continued to serve as a magistrate after its independence and annexation into Iturbide's empire in Mexico. After the collapse of the empire in 1823, Cózar would promote the membership of Los Altos as a state into the newly formed Federal Republic of Central America.

=== Death ===
Cózar married Matilde Molina Barberena in 1789, a daughter of famous surgeon Manuel Molina and doña Manuela Barberena, both members of prominent families in Antigua Guatemala.

Cózar died on 6 April 1824 in Quetzaltenango. He would be survived by his son José Gabriel, who would later become an important figure in the political and military society of Quetzaltenango.
