= San Andrés Xecul =

Coordinates: 14°54′N 91°29′W

- Municipality
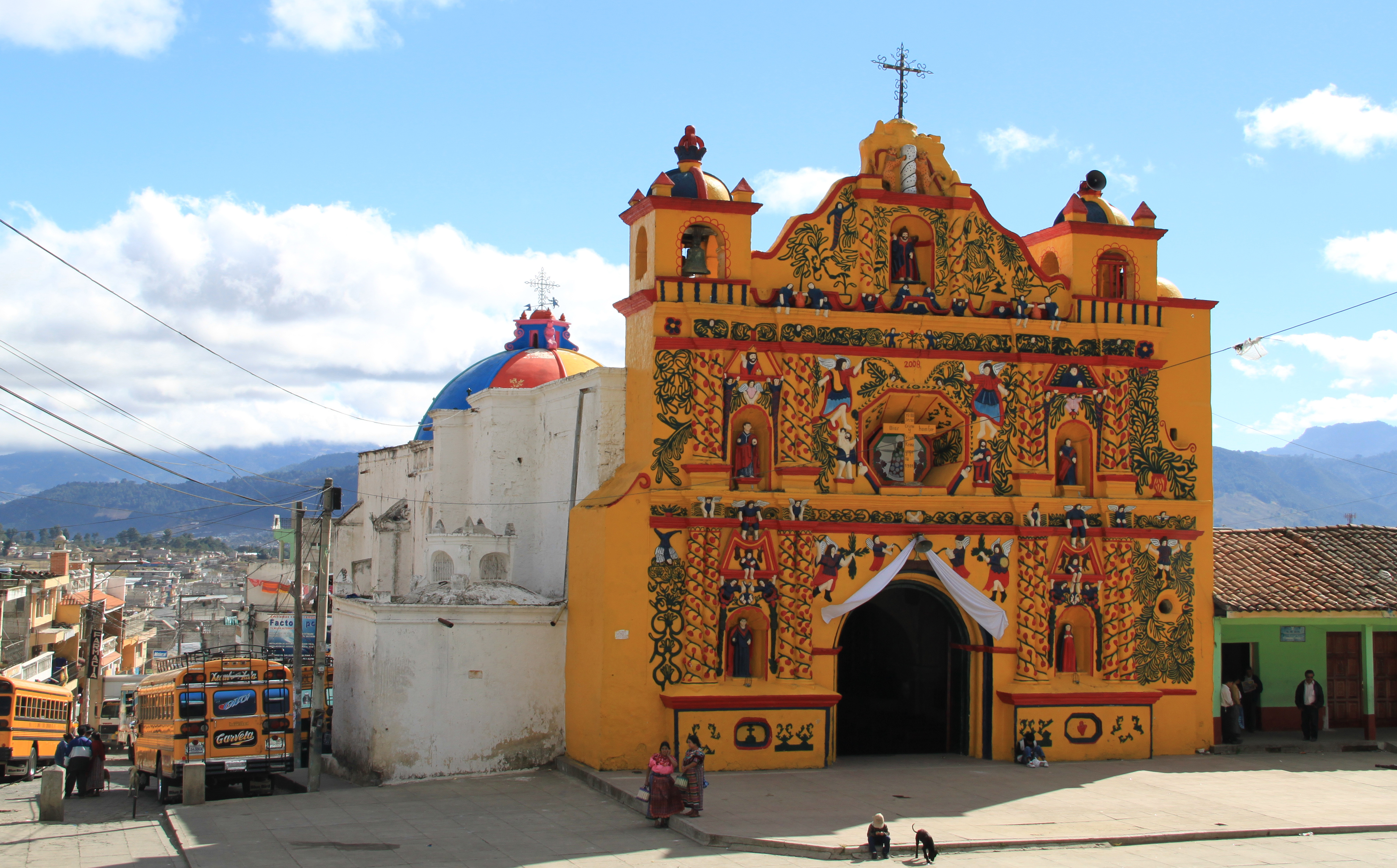
- Church of San Andrés Xecul, December 2009

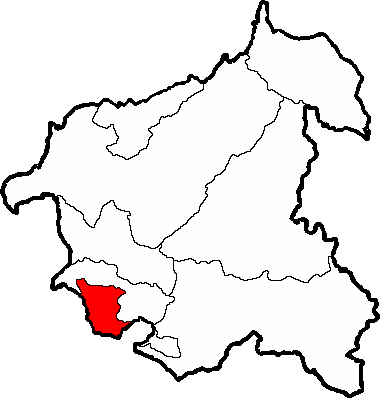
- San Andrés Xecul within Totonicapán

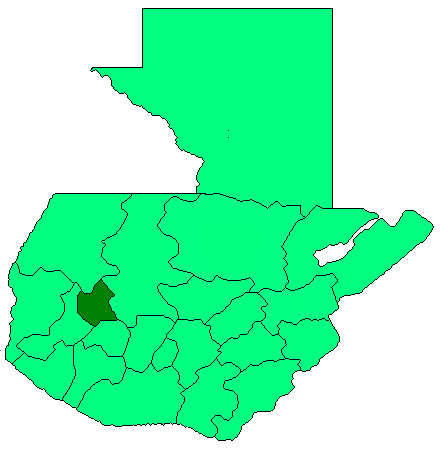
- Totonicapán within Guatemala
- Country: Guatemala
- Department: Totonicapán

Government
  - Type: Municipal

Area
  - Total: 25.6 km^{2} (9.9 sq mi)

Population (2018 census)
  - Total: 26,984
  - Density: 1,050/km^{2} (2,730/sq mi)
  - Ethnicities: K'iche' Ladino
  - Religions: Catholicism Evangelicalism Maya

San Andrés Xecul (Spanish pronunciation: [san anˈdɾes ʃeˈkul]) is a town, with a population of 15,074 (2018 census), and a municipality in the Totonicapán department of Guatemala.
