= Totonicapán Department =

Department of Guatemala

Totonicapán Department Departamento de Totonicapán
- Department of Guatemala
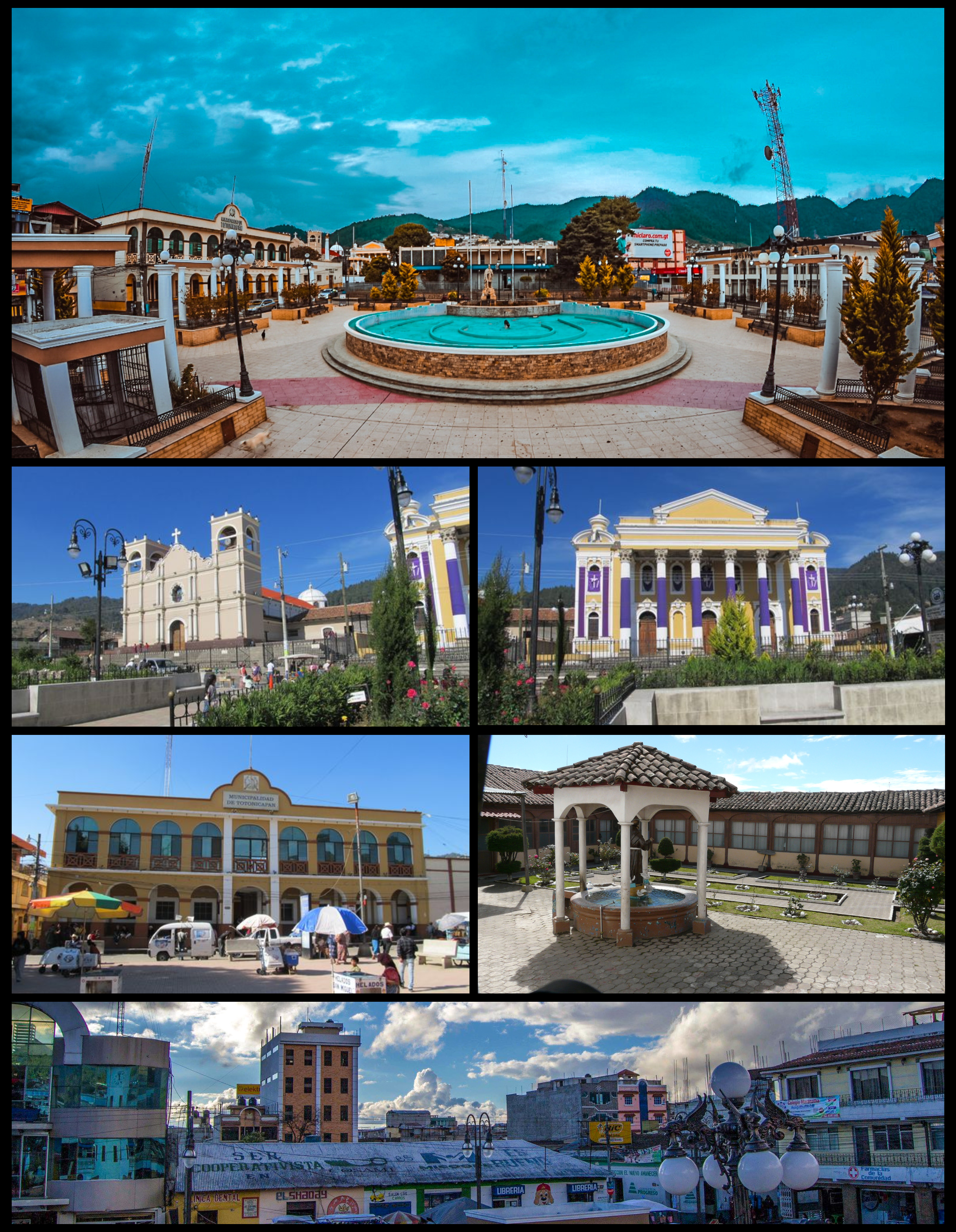
- From above and from left to right: Central park, San Miguel Church, Municipal Theater, Municipal Building, building interior in the historic center and urban panorama of Totonicapán.

- Flag Coat of arms

- Totonicapán
- Coordinates: 14°54′45″N 91°21′36″W
- Country: Guatemala
- Capital: Totonicapán
- Largest settlement: Momostenango
- Municipalities: 8

Government
  - Type: Departmental

Area
  - Department of Guatemala: 1,061 km^{2} (410 sq mi)

Population (2018)
  - Department of Guatemala: 418,569
  - Density: 394.5/km^{2} (1,022/sq mi)
  - Urban: 204,938
  - Ethnicities: Kʼicheʼ people Ladino
  - Religions: Roman Catholicism Evangelicalism Maya
- Time zone: UTC-6
- ISO 3166 code: GT-TO

Totonicapán is one of the 22 departments of Guatemala. The capital is the city of Totonicapán.

== History ==
Historical chronicler Francisco Antonio de Fuentes y Guzmán, described the municipalities of Totonicapán in his 1689 "Recordación Florida." This record confirms the area's pre-Columbian origins.

In July 1820, the indigenous residents of Totonicapán revolted against the government in response to excessive tributes imposed by the Spanish King Ferdinand VII. The Totonicapán Uprising of 1820 was led by Atanasio Tzul and Lucas Aguilar. After toppling the local government, Tzul declared himself king of the breakaway province, with Aguilar as president. The mayor of neighboring Quetzaltenango, Prudencio Cózar, along with hundreds of armed men, led an invasion to put down the rebellion. The rebel government lasted about 20 days. The rebels were captured, whipped, and imprisoned.

The rebellion is widely celebrated in Guatemala as the opening volley in the independence struggle, though more recent scholarship on the rebellion has suggested that its leaders were less concerned with breaking from the Spanish Crown than they were concerned with the unfair demands of the American born Spanish elite, or criollos.

== Geography ==
Totonicapán has an area of 1,061 km^{2} located in the western highlands. Its territory is crossed by ramifications of the Sierra Madre, and includes mountains as Cuxniquel, Campanabaj, and Cerro de Coxóm. Important rivers in Totonicapaán include the Samalá, Pachac, Las Palmeras, Sajcocolaj, Patzotzil, Huacol and Pajá.

The department is widely recognized in Central America for its extensive highland oak-pine forests with also fir and cypress stands, these hold some of the largest stands of the threatened Guatemalan fir, Abies guatemalensis, known locally as the pinabete. The forests cover extensive portions of the Sierra Madre, especially in the municipios of San Francisco el Alto and Totonicapán, and are held in a variety of communal arrangements, including village, clan (parcialidad) and municipio-wide ownership.

== Demographics ==
=== Population ===
The National Institute of Statistics of Guatemala estimated the population of Totonicapán to be 418,569 in 2018, down from 506,537 in 2013.

The male/female ratio of the department is 47.7/52.3, and as is true for Guatemala as a whole, Totonicapán has a relatively young population, with a median age of 16 (nationally it is only 17).

=== Ethnicity ===
Approximately 97% of the population of Totonicapán identify as indigenous (primarily Kʼicheʼ Maya), compared to only about 40% nationwide. The remaining 3% identifying as non-indigenous are primarily Ladino.

=== Language ===
Many of the Mayan inhabitants of Totonicapán speak Kʼicheʼ, though Spanish is also used throughout the department.

== Government ==
=== Municipalities ===
1. Momostenango
2. San Andrés Xecul
3. San Bartolo
4. San Cristóbal Totonicapán
5. San Francisco El Alto
6. Santa Lucía La Reforma
7. Santa María Chiquimula
8. Totonicapán

== Economy ==
As of 1850, the department produced wheat, maize, sugar, fruits, and vegetables. Livestock is raised the area.

== Transportation ==
Cuatro Caminos ("four roads") is a well-known intersection of roads that go to Quetzaltenango, Guatemala City, Huehuetenango and Totonicapán.
