= San Francisco El Alto =

- Municipality
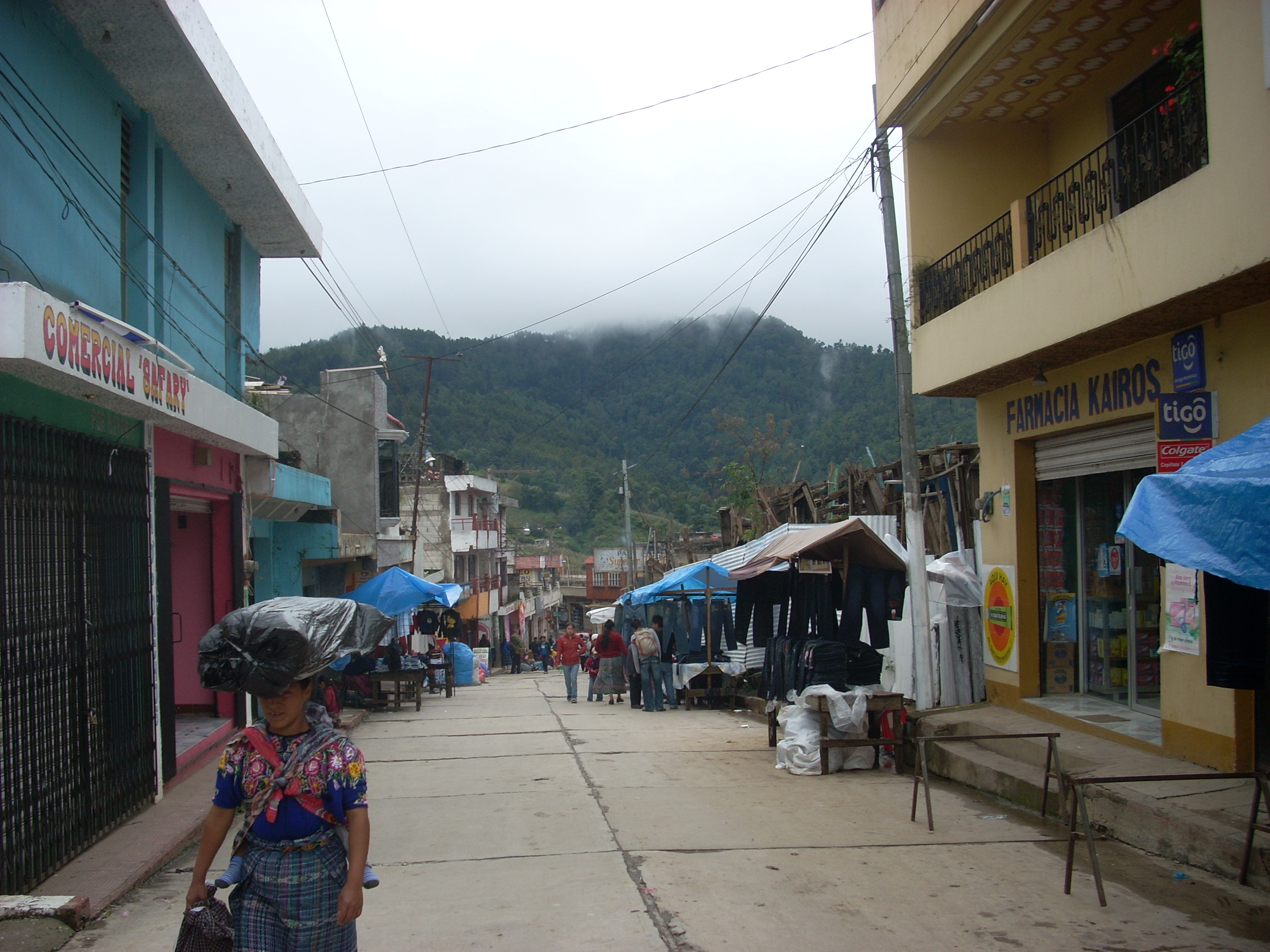
- Street in San Francisco El Alto, Totonicapan, Guatemala.

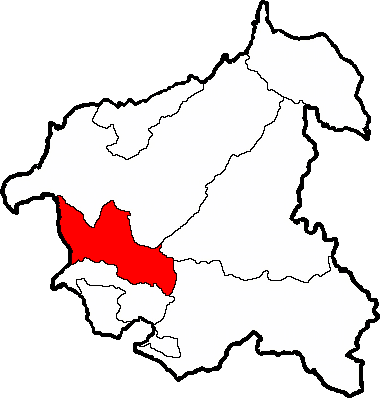
- San Francisco El Alto within Totonicapán

- >
- Coordinates: 14°57′N 91°27′W
- Country: Guatemala
- Department: Totonicapán

Government
  - Type: Municipal

Area
  - Total: 76.3 km^{2} (29.5 sq mi)

Population (2018 census)
  - Total: 57,894
  - Density: 759/km^{2} (1,970/sq mi)
  - Ethnicities: Kʼicheʼ Ladino
  - Religions: Catholicism Evangelicalism Maya

The countryside of Paxixil, an aldea (village) of the municipality of San Francisco El Alto.

San Francisco El Alto (Spanish pronunciation: [saɱ fɾanˈsisko el ˈalto]) is a town, with a population of 38,995 (2018 census), and a municipality in the Totonicapán department of Guatemala.

The municipality includes the villages or aldeas of: Chivarreto, Chirrenox, Pabatoc, Paxixil, Rancho de Teja, Pachaj, Sacmixit, San Antonio Sija, Saquicol Chiquito, and Tacajalbé. The Sacmixit community forest is located within the municipality.

The church on the central plaza of San Francisco El Alto

== History ==
Before the Spanish Conquest, Chuisiguán was a Kʼicheʼ language Mayan community at the site of San Francisco El Alto. Chuisiguán is Kʼicheʼ for "place on the precipice," apt for its location at the top of a steep hill.(account suspended)

Historical chronicler Francisco Antonio de Fuentes y Guzmán mentions the town in his 1689 Recordación Florida. This record confirms the town's pre-Columbian origins. He noted 2,880 Mayan inhabitants and 720 "tributarios."

Residents of San Francisco El Alto joined the revolt against excessive tributes that began on 1820-02-20 in Santa María Chiquimula.

Today the local economy thrives on the hundreds of small family-owned and operated clothing fabricators, with the result that clothing exports now exceeds the traditional 'Big Three' of coffee, sugar and bananas. One result of the Civil War was the mass-emigration of Indigenous Maya to the United States and a massive influx of 'remesas' (electronic remittances) to their families, with the result that for several years, over 50% of the country's economy was cash remittances to the Indigenous Maya.

Since people of purer Spanish descent were less likely to emigrate and receive refugee status, the balance of economical and political power has sharply shifted from Spanish domination to increased opportunities for the industrious Maya. This can be seen from the bustling textile market days that fill the entire urban area of San Francisco El Alto, making it a favorite tourist destination.

Transportation has also improved as flotillas of tricycle taxis (tuk-tuks) and passenger vans (micros) provide services to any location in the area. While the Maya remain suspicious of anyone from outside small rural communities, they are interested in foreign contacts and often invite travelers into their homes and festivals.

Since 1900, the Chivarreto boxing tournament has been held at the municipality.
