= Nueva Santa Catarina Ixtahuacan =

Guatemalan village with rich Mayan culture

Coordinates: 14°51.25′N 91°21.5′W

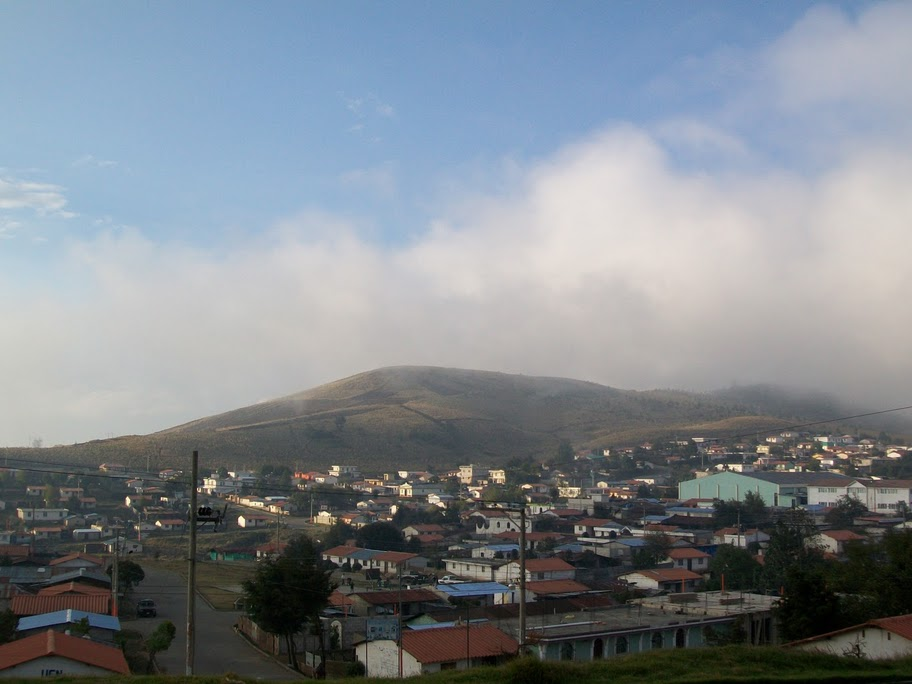
Nueva Santa Catarina Ixtahuaca

Nueva Santa Catarina Ixtahuacan is a village in the northwest corner of the Sololá department of Guatemala, about 169 km (105 mi) west of Guatemala City. The village (not be confused with Santa Catarina Ixtahuacan, see below) is along both Guatemalan Highway 3 and Central American Highway CA-1. The village has a population of around 4000 people and is approximately 3048 meters (10,000 feet) above sea-level. The village is known for its Mayan culture, including traditional Mayan weavings created with a back-strap loom.

== History ==
Nueva Santa Catarina Ixtahuacan is a relatively young village. The village was formed in 1998, when 60% of the village of Santa Catarina Ixtahuacan was destroyed by large landslides during Hurricane Mitch and residents decided to establish a new village on higher ground. Although the decision to move was made by the community, the federal government provided some assistance and infrastructure funding, including for houses and paved roads.

== Background ==
Although Guatemala as a whole is fairly tropical, Nueva Santa Catarina Ixtahuacan's location in the country's highlands give it a unique micro-climate. Depending on the season, temperatures can range from below freezing at night to over 35 °C (95 °F) during the day, with large swings in between. A lack of cloud cover can make temperature swings very pronounced during the day. The region receives almost no precipitation during the dry season.

Like much of rural Guatemala, the village suffers from chronic poverty and low rates of education. Many households lack reliable electricity, and running water is intermittent in the village (usually available for only 30 minutes per day), due to both high elevation and lack of infrastructure.

The primary language spoken in the village is Kʼicheʼ, although many villagers (adults and children) also know Spanish.

== International Involvement ==
Nueva Santa Catarina Ixtahuacan has attracted attention from numerous international non-profits in recent years. The Rutgers University branch of Engineers Without Borders is currently (2011) re-designing and repairing the village's water supply system, with scheduled completion by December 2011. Additionally, the Ann Arbor-based non-profit Appropriate Technology Collaborative has been leading student project teams from Rutgers, the University of Michigan, and Michigan State University to work on energy, water, and health issues in the village since 2007. All projects are available online at no cost.

== Photos ==
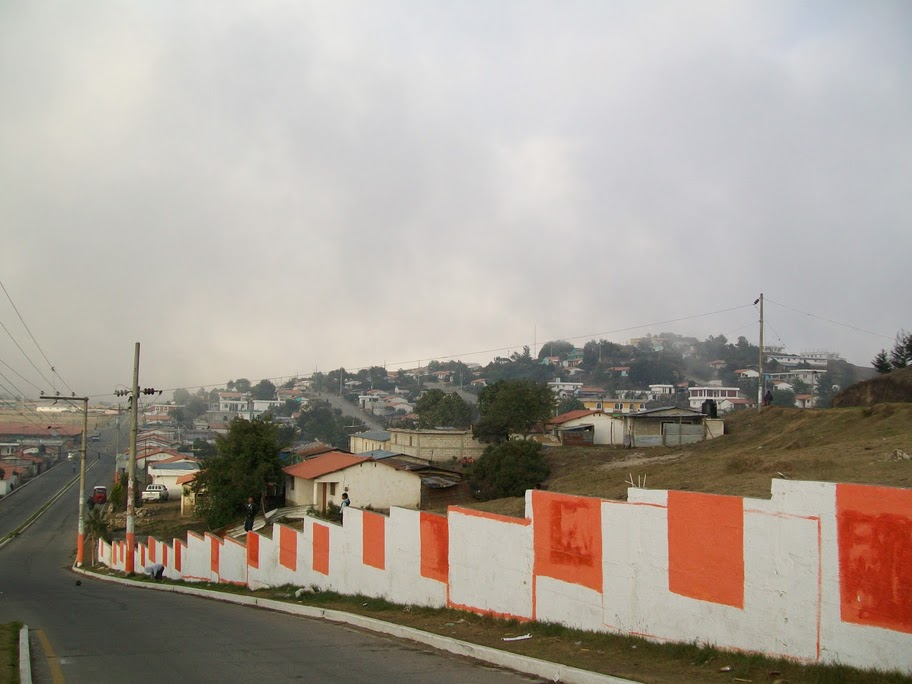

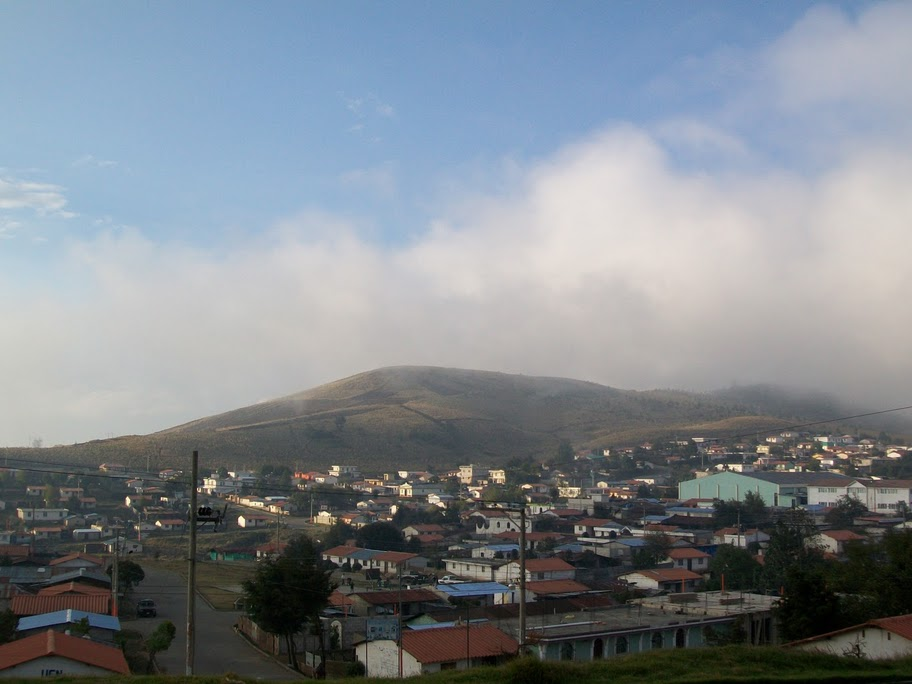

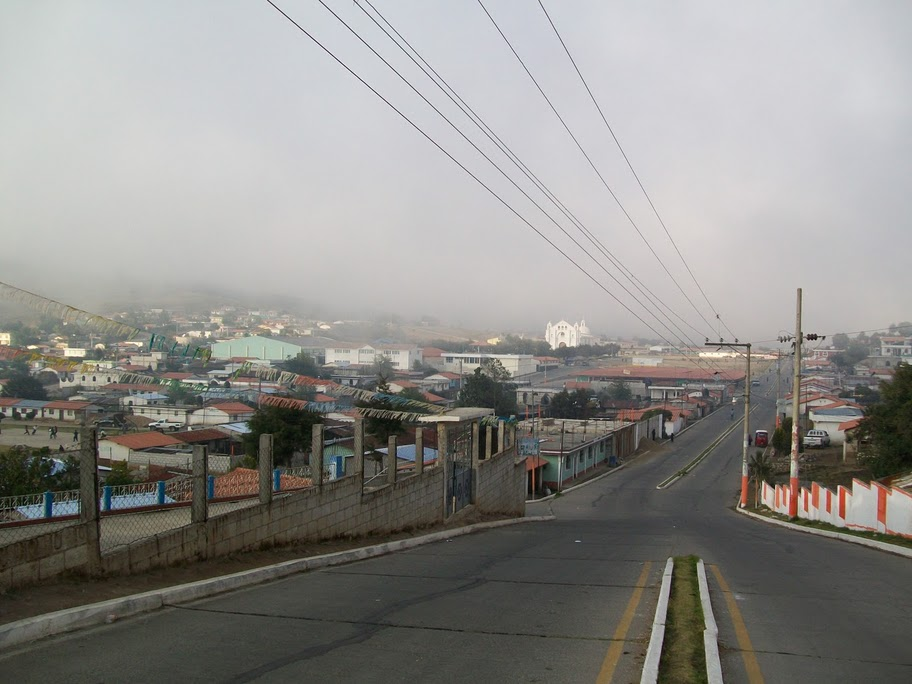

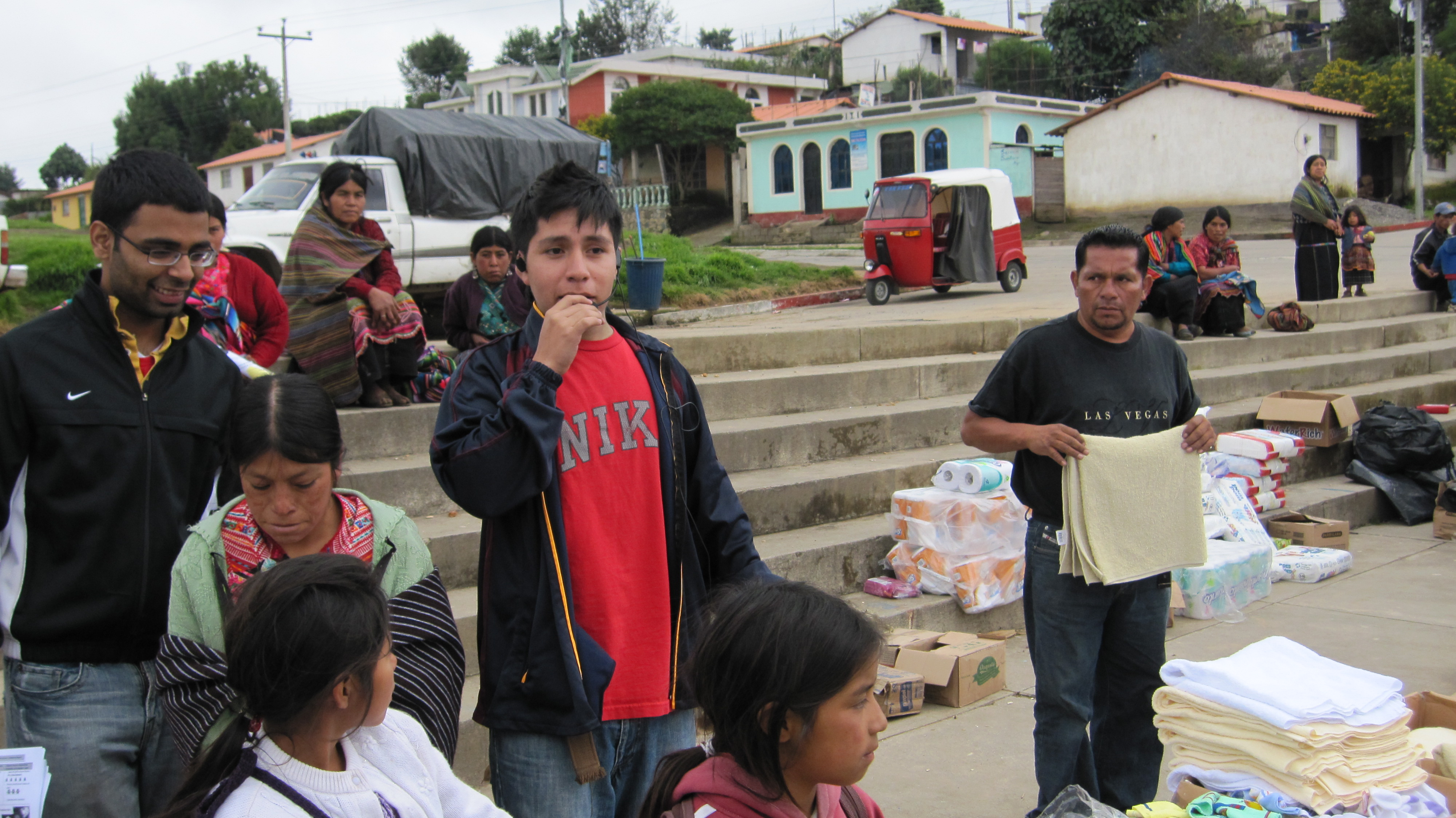
