= Chivarreto boxing =

Type of boxing practiced in Guatemala

Chivarreto boxing, also known as Boxeo a puño limpio, is a type of boxing that is practiced in the Chivarreto villa in San Francisco El Alto, Totonicapan, Guatemala. It is a popular activity in town and there is an annual tournament, held during Semana Santa every year, with fights held on Good Friday. The tournaments began as a punishment to criminals who'd then have to fight it out amongst themselves; since 1900, it developed into an open contest in which anyone can participate, and winners receive trophies.

== Rules ==
Chivarreto boxing rules differ from traditional, amateur or professional boxing rules in that, at Chivarreto, no boxing gloves are used, fighters instead fight bare-knuckled.

Typically, there are four referees present to enforce rules and protect fighters from unnecessary harm, instead of one as in other types of boxing. Bouts are held inside a ring, which is placed near Chivarreto's plaza in order so that all of Chivarreto's residents and also tourists from other areas can be spectators.

Unlike other types of boxing, knockouts are declared immediately after one contestant hits the floor due to a punch being connected on him or her. Knockouts are also declared if one of the contestants quits. If a knockout does not happen after a while, it is up to the contestants to decide when to finish their bout, after which the four referees decide upon a winner.
