= Malacatancito =

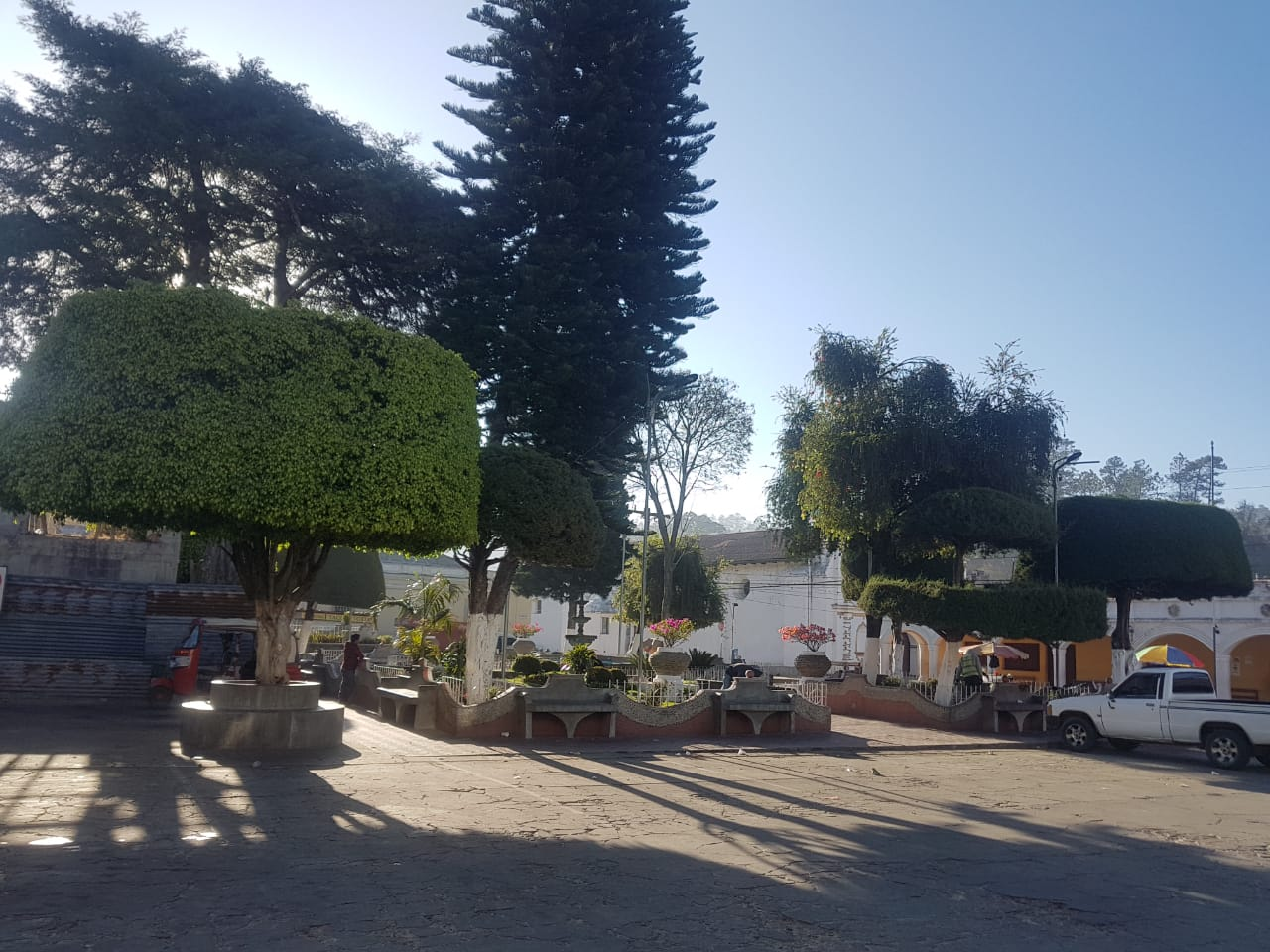

- Location in Guatemala
- Coordinates: 15°14′48″N 91°29′57″W
- Country: Guatemala
- Department: Huehuetenango

Government
  - Mayor: Irma Elizabeth Ávila Alvarado (Vamos)

Area
  - Total: 312.4 km^{2} (120.6 sq mi)

Population (2023 projection)
  - Total: 23,359
  - Density: 74.77/km^{2} (193.7/sq mi)
- Climate: Cwb

Malacatancito (Spanish pronunciation: [malakatanˈsito]) is a mostly rural municipality in the Guatemalan department of Huehuetenango, spanning 312.4 square kilometers with an estimated population of 23,359 as of 2023. Its residents are primarily of Ladino and Maya descent, speaking Spanish and Kʼicheʼ as their primary mother tongues. The municipality features a warm, low-humidity subtropical highland climate marked by extreme seasonal variations in precipitation and cloud cover between its distinct wet and dry seasons. The municipal government is led by Mayor Irma Elizabeth Ávila Alvarado of the Vamos party, who has served consecutive terms since her election in 2019.

== Demographics ==
According to data from the Guatemalan National Institute of Statistics, the population of the Malacatancito municipality has shown steady growth over recent decades. In mid-2008, the population was estimated at 19,177 residents, which increased to an estimated 20,846 by June 2018. Population projections for mid-2023 indicated a further increase to 23,359 inhabitants, representing an annual growth rate of 2.3%. Across the municipality's total area of 312.4 square kilometers, this population size yields a population density of 74.77 people per square kilometer.

The 2023 projections reveal a nearly equal gender distribution within the municipality, consisting of 11,731 males (50.2%) and 11,628 females (49.8%). The population structure is notably young. Children aged 0 to 14 years account for 34.1% of the population (7,972 residents), while the working age demographic between 15 and 64 years represents the majority at 58.7% (13,710 residents). Elders aged 65 and older make up the remaining 7.2% (1,677 residents).

Data from the 2018 census highlights that Malacatancito is almost entirely rural, with 95.6% of the population (18,320 people) living in rural areas compared to just 4.4% (835 people) residing in urban centers. The census also reflects a very localized population regarding birthplace, as 84.2% of residents (15,967 people) were born in Malacatancito. An additional 15.7% (2,972 people) migrated from other municipalities of Guatemala, while only 31 residents were born in another country.

In terms of ethnic composition, the 2018 census recorded Ladinos as the largest demographic group, comprising 69.8% of the population (13,362 people). The Maya population represents the second-largest group at 30% (5,752 people). Other ethnic populations registered in the municipality include 17 Garifuna, 11 Afro-Guatemalans, 1 Xinca, and 12 foreign residents.

Linguistic data from 2018 closely mirrors the ethnic breakdown, with Spanish being the predominant mother tongue spoken by 76.7% of the population (13,342 people). Among the Mayan languages spoken in the municipality, Kʼicheʼ is the most prevalent, serving as the mother tongue for 18.7% of residents (3,258 people), followed by Mam at 3.3% (582 people). Smaller linguistic groups include 11 Kaqchikel speakers, 5 Qʼeqchiʼ speakers, and 188 people (1.1%) who speak other languages. Educational metrics from the same census indicate a literacy rate of 83.7% among residents aged seven and older, representing 13,358 literate individuals, while 16.3% (2,601 people) were recorded as illiterate.

== Climate ==
The climate of Malacatancito is warm year-round, with temperatures typically ranging from 46 °F to 82 °F and rarely falling below 40 °F or exceeding 86 °F. The municipality features a brief warm season from 11 March to 10 May, peaking in May with an average high of 79 °F, and a cooler season from 16 September to 19 January, with January averaging a low of 47 °F. Due to its comfortable, humidity-free profile, which is highly comparable to the climates of Mbeya, Tanzania and Bonga, Ethiopia, the ideal time for outdoor tourism and warm-weather activities is from mid-February to late April.

Precipitation and cloud cover vary drastically by season, though perceived humidity remains at a constant 0% all year. The 5.6-month wet season runs from 10 May to 30 October, peaking in September with an average of 23.2 rainy days and 10.0 inches of accumulated rainfall, under skies that are 95% overcast in June. Conversely, the dry season spans from late October to May, with January serving as both the clearest month (74% clear or partly cloudy) and the driest, averaging just 0.2 inches of rain. Mild wind speeds peak in December at 4.2 miles per hour, while daylight ranges from roughly 11 to 13 hours without the observation of daylight saving time.

== Government ==
The current mayor of Malacatancito is Irma Elizabeth Ávila Alvarado, who was first elected in 2019. After representing the National Unity of Hope (UNE) party in her first term, she switched affiliation to the Vamos party and was re-elected in 2023.
