= Cerro de Coxóm =

Mountain in Guatemala

- Location within Guatemala

Highest point
- Elevation: 3,045 m (9,990 ft)
- Coordinates: 14°53′15″N 91°23′52″W

Geography
- Location: Totonicapán, Guatemala

Geology
- Mountain type: Stratovolcano
- Last eruption: Unknown

Cerro de Coxóm is a stratovolcano in Totonicapán in western Guatemala. The 3,045-metre-high (9,990 ft) volcano is located at the eastern edge of the valley of Quetzaltenango, in southwest Guatemala.

== See also ==
- List of volcanoes in Guatemala
