= Santa Lucía La Reforma =

Coordinates: 15°08′N 91°14′W

- Municipality
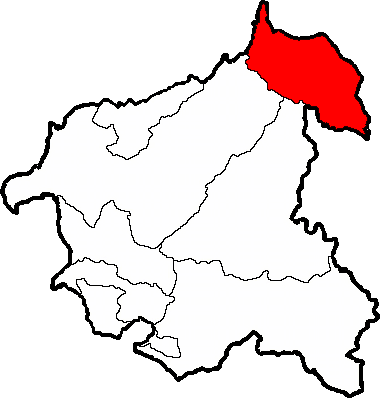
- Santa Lucía La Reforma within Totonicapán

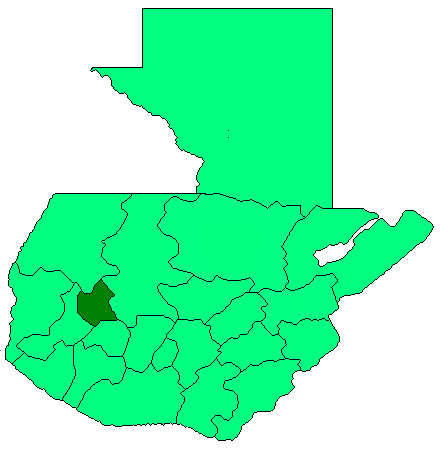
- Totonicapán within Guatemala
- Country: Guatemala
- Department: Totonicapán

Government
  - Type: Municipal

Population (2012)
  - Total: 22,296
  - Ethnicities: K'iche' Ladino
  - Religions: Catholicism Evangelicalism Maya

Santa Lucía La Reforma (Spanish pronunciation: [ˈsanta luˈsi.a la reˈfoɾma]) is a municipality in the Totonicapán department of Guatemala.
