= Santa María Chiquimula =

- Municipality
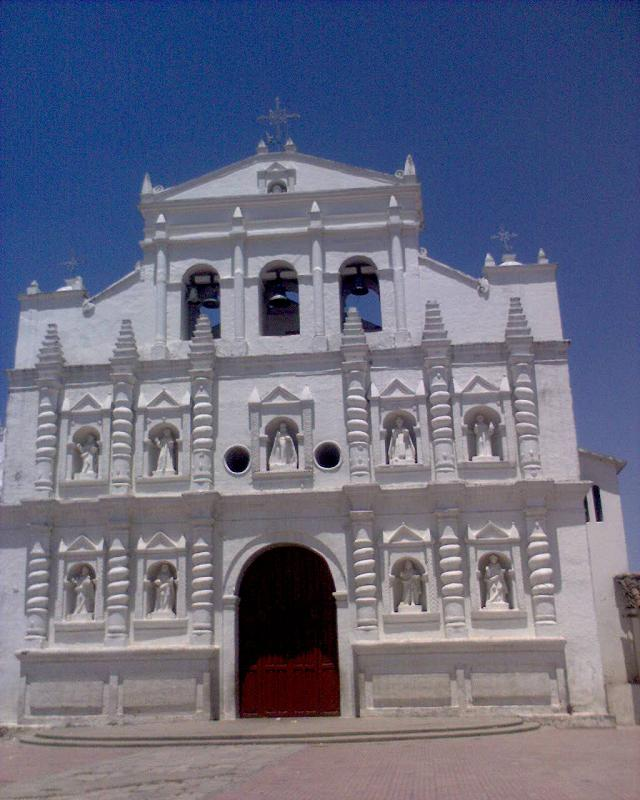
- Catholic church of Santa María Chiquimula

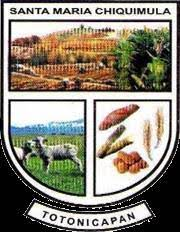
- Coat of arms

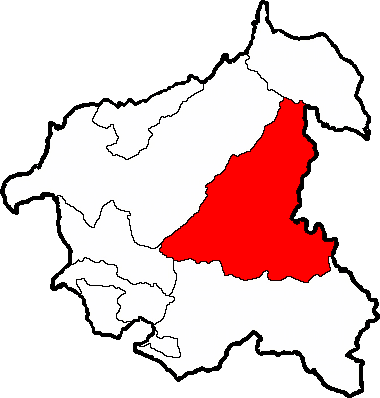
- Santa María Chiquimula within Totonicapán

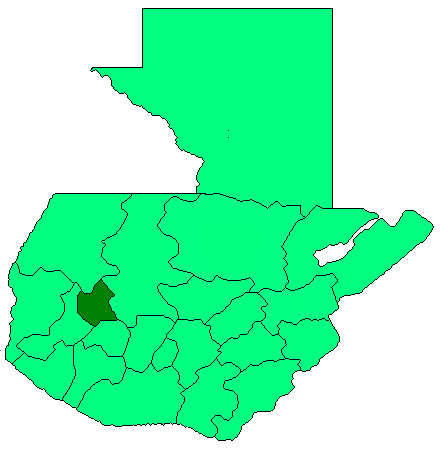
- Totonicapán within Guatemala
- Coordinates: 15°01′45″N 91°19′46″W
- Country: Guatemala
- Department: Totonicapán

Government
  - Type: Municipal

Area
  - Total: 236 km^{2} (91 sq mi)
- Elevation: 2,130 m (6,990 ft)

Population (2018 census)
  - Total: 55,013
  - Density: 233/km^{2} (604/sq mi)
  - Ethnicities: Kʼicheʼ Ladino
  - Religions: Catholicism Evangelicalism Maya
- Climate: Cwb
- Website: Official site

Santa María Chiquimula is a town, with a population of 15,919 (2018 census), and a municipality in the Totonicapán department of Guatemala. Located in the western highlands of Guatemala at an altitude of 2130 metres. The municipality has an area of 236 km^{2} (91 sq mi) and a population of 55,013 (2018 census). The Mayan Kʼicheʼ language is spoken among the indigenous people here, but Spanish is also widely spoken. The main products of the region are corn and black beans.

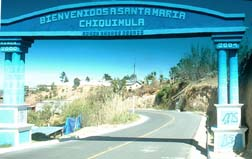
Welcome sign for Santa María Chiquimula, 2004-04-16

== Dialect ==
The Kʼicheʼ spoken in Santa María Chiquimula is marked by intervocalic /l/ transitioning into [ð], especially among women.
