= Totonicapán =

- Municipality
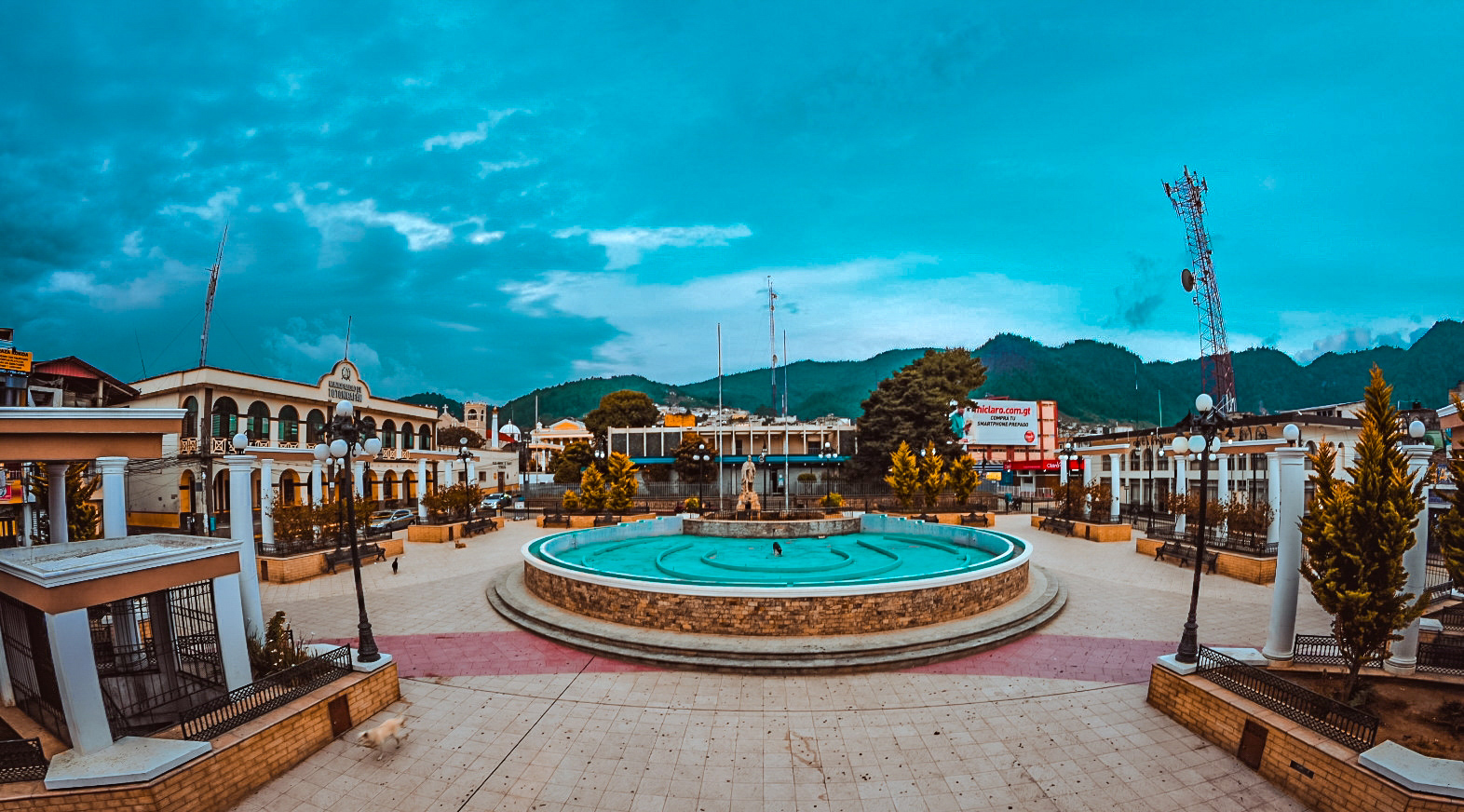
- Central park of Totonicapán
- Nickname: Toto
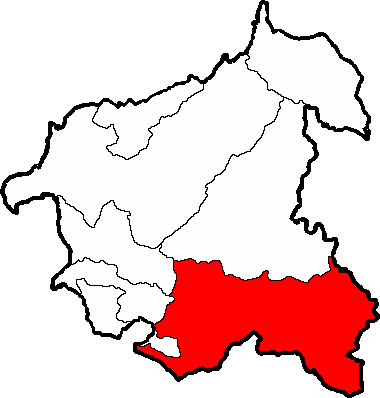
- Municipality of Totonicapán within the Department of Totonicapán

- Location within Guatemala
- Coordinates: 14°54′39″N 91°21′38″W
- Country: Guatemala
- Department: Totonicapán

Government
  - Type: Municipal

Area
  - Municipality: 274 km^{2} (106 sq mi)
- Elevation: 2,495 m (8,186 ft)

Population (2018 census)
  - Municipality: 103,952
  - Density: 379/km^{2} (983/sq mi)
  - Urban: 103,952
  - Ethnicities: K'iche' people Ladino
  - Religions: Roman Catholicism Evangelicalism Maya
- Climate: Cwb

Totonicapán is a city in Guatemala. It serves as the capital of the department of Totonicapán and as the administrative seat for the surrounding municipality of Totonicapán.

== History ==
In 1820, the city experienced an uprising of indigenous people led by Atanasio Tzul. The rebellion lasted 24 days, and was successfully suppressed by the Spanish.

In 1838 Totonicapán was declared an independent republic, in which the adjoining departments of Sololá and Quezaltenango were included. This state existed for two years, and was then again merged in the republic of Guatemala.

Totonicapán suffered greatly in the earthquake of April 18, 1902.

Historically, Totonicapán was known for its hot springs.

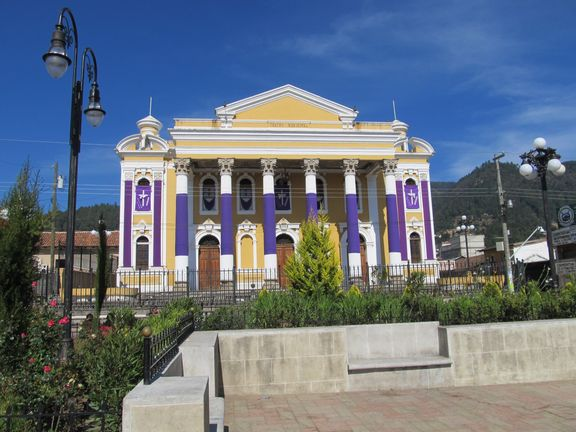
Municipal Theater of Totonicapán

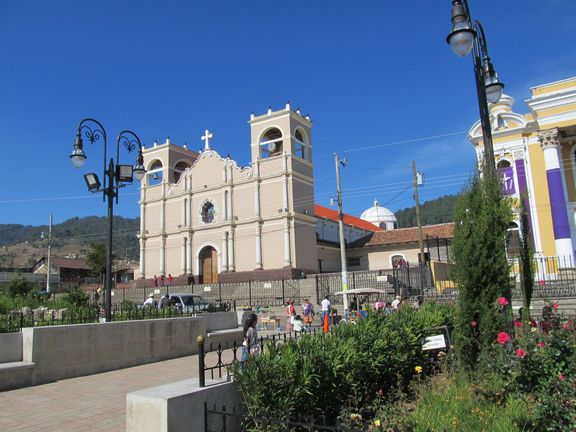
Central plaza in Totonicapán

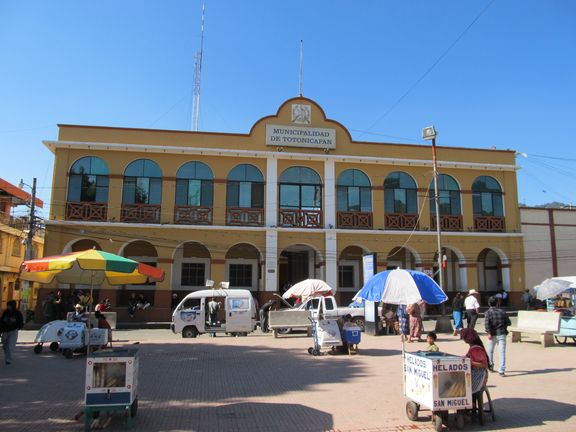
Municipal building of Totonicapán

== See also ==
- Los Altos (state), 19th-century state including Totonicapán
- Municipalities of Guatemala
