= Kʼicheʼ language =

Mayan language spoken by the Kʼicheʼ people

Kʼicheʼ
- Quiché
- Kʼicheʼ, Qatzijobʼal
- Pronunciation: [kʼiˈtʃeʔ]
- Native to: Guatemala, Mexico
- Region: Quetzaltenango, Quiché, Retalhuleu, Sololá, Suchitepéquez, Totonicapán, Chiapas
- Ethnicity: Kʼicheʼ
- Native speakers: 1.1 million (2019 census)
- Language family: Mayan: Eastern (Quichean–Mamean); Greater Quichean; Quichean; Quiché–Achi; Kʼicheʼ
- Early form: Classical Kʼicheʼ
- Dialects: Central; East; West; South; North
- Writing system: Latin

Official status
- Official language in: Mexico
- Recognised minority language in: Guatemala
- Regulated by: Instituto Nacional de Lenguas Indígenas; Academia de Lenguas Mayas de Guatemala

Language codes
- ISO 639-3: quc
- Glottolog: kich1262
- ELP: K'iche'
- Kʼicheʼ language area shown in teal

A Kʼicheʼ speaker

Kʼicheʼ (/kiːˈtʃeɪ/ kee-CHAY; natively [kʼiˈtʃʰeʔ], also known as Qatzijobʼal lit. 'our language' among its speakers), or Quiché, is a Mayan language spoken by the Kʼicheʼ people of the central highlands in Guatemala and Mexico. With over a million speakers (some 7% of Guatemala's population), Kʼicheʼ is the second most widely-spoken language in the country, after Spanish. It is one of the most widely-spoken indigenous American languages in Mesoamerica.

The Central dialect is the most commonly used in media and education. Despite a low literacy rate, Kʼicheʼ is increasingly taught in schools and used on the radio. The most famous work in the Classical Kʼicheʼ language is the Popol Vuh (Popol Wuʼuj in modern spelling). The second most important work is The Title of Totonicapán.

== Dialects ==
Kaufman (1970) divides the Kʼicheʼ complex into the following five dialects, with the representative municipalities given as well (quoted in Par Sapón 2000:17):

East

Guatemala:

- Joyabaj
- Zacualpa
- Cubulco
- Rabinal
- San Miguel Chicaj

Mexico:

- Las Margaritas
- La Trinitaria
- Marqués de Comillas

West

Guatemala:

- Nahualá
- Santa Clara La Laguna
- Santa Lucía Utatlán
- Aldea Argueta, Sololá
- Cantel
- Zunil
- San José Chiquilajá, Quetzaltenango
- Totonicapán
- Momostenango

Central

Guatemala:

- Santa María Chiquimula
- San Antonio Ilotenango
- Santa Cruz del Quiché
- Chichicastenango

Mexico:

- Marqués de Comillas
- Campeche
- Champotón

North

Guatemala:

- Cunén

South

Guatemala:

- Samayac
- Mazatenango

The Nahualá dialect of Kʼicheʼ shows some differences from other Kʼicheʼ dialects. It preserves an ancient Proto-Mayan distinction between five long vowels (aa, ee, ii, oo, uu) and five short vowels (a, e, i, o, u). It is for that conservative linguistic feature that Guatemalan and foreign linguists have actively sought to have the language called Kʼichee, rather than Kʼicheʼ or Quiché.

== Phonology ==
Kʼicheʼ has a rather conservative phonology. It has not developed many of the innovations found in neighboring languages, such as retroflex consonants or tone.

=== Stress ===
Stress is not phonemic. It occurs on the final syllable and on every other syllable before the final in an iambic pattern.

Unstressed vowels are frequently reduced (to [ɨ] or [ə]) or elided altogether, which often produces consonant clusters even word-initially. For example, sibʼalaj "very" may be pronounced [siɓlaχ] and je na laʼ "thus" [χenðaʔ].

=== Vowels ===
Ten-vowel
	Front		Central		Back	
	short	long	short	long	short	long
Close	i	iː			u	uː
Mid	e	eː			o	oː
Open			a	aː		

Six-vowel
	Front	Central	Back
Close	i		u
Mid	e	ə	o
Open		a	

Kʼicheʼ dialects differ in their vowel systems. Historically, Kʼicheʼ had a ten-vowel system: five short and five long. Some dialects (such as Nahualá and Totonicapán) retain the ten-vowel system. Others (such as Cantel) have reduced it to a six-vowel system with no length distinctions: short /a/ has become /ə/ in these dialects, and the other short vowels have merged with their long counterparts. Different conventions for spelling the vowels have been proposed, including by the Proyecto Lingüístico Francisco Marroquín, the Summer Institute of Linguistics, and the Academia de Lenguas Mayas de Guatemala. This table shows the two vowel systems and several of the spelling systems that have been proposed:

Phonemes		Spelling		
Ten-vowel	Six-vowel	PLFM	SIL	ALMG
/a/	/ə/	a	ä	a
/aː/	/a/	aa	a	a
/e/	/e/	e	ë	e
/eː/	/e/	ee	e	e
/i/	/i/	i	ï	i
/iː/	/i/	ii	i	i
/o/	/o/	o	ö	o
/oː/	/o/	oo	o	o
/u/	/u/	u	ü	u
/uː/	/u/	uu	u	u

Vowels typically undergo syncope in penultimate syllables, which allows for a wide array of complex onsets. Diphthongs are found in recent loanwords.

=== Consonants ===
		Bilabial	Alveolar		Palatal	Velar	Uvular	Glottal
		Bilabial	plain	sibilant	Palatal	Velar	Uvular	Glottal
Nasal		m ⟨m⟩	n ⟨n⟩					
Plosive/ Affricate	pulmonic	p ⟨p⟩	t ⟨t⟩	ts ⟨tz⟩	tʃ ⟨ch⟩	k ⟨k⟩	q ⟨q⟩	ʔ ⟨ʼ⟩
Plosive/ Affricate	glottalic	ɓ ⟨bʼ⟩	tʼ ⟨tʼ⟩	tsʼ ⟨tzʼ⟩	tʃʼ ⟨chʼ⟩	kʼ ⟨kʼ⟩	qʼ ⟨qʼ⟩	ʔ ⟨ʼ⟩
Fricative			(ð)	s ⟨s⟩	ʃ ⟨x⟩		χ ⟨j⟩	h ⟨h⟩
Approximant			l ⟨l⟩		j ⟨y⟩	w ⟨w⟩		
Vibrant			r ~ ɾ ⟨r⟩					

- /ɓ/ is a weak implosive while /tʼ tsʼ tʃʼ kʼ qʼ/ are ejectives.
- The pulmonic stops are typically aspirated.
- In West Quiche, /l j w r/ devoice and fricate to [ɬ], [ç], [xʷ] and [r̥] word-finally and often before voiceless consonants.
- In the dialect of Santa María Chiquimula, intervocalic /l/ alternates between [l ~ ð], a highly unusual form of allophony. [ð] is most common in the vicinity of the vowels /a(:) o(:)/.

=== Syllabic structure ===
Complex onsets are very common in Kʼicheʼ, partially because of the active process of penultimate syncope. Complex codas are rare except when the first member of the complex coda is a phonemic glottal stop, which is written with an apostrophe. The sonorants /m, n, l, r/ may be syllabic.

== Orthography ==
Historically, different orthographies have been used to transcribe the Kʼicheʼ languages. The classical orthography of Father Ximénez, who wrote down the Popol Vuh, is based on Spanish orthography and has been replaced by a new standardized orthography, defined by the ALMG (Academia de Lenguas Mayas de Guatemala). The ethnohistorian and Mayanist Dennis Tedlock uses his own transliteration system, which is completely different from any of the established orthographies.

The first line of Popol Wuj in different orthographies
Ximénez's classical orthography	Are v xe oher tzíh varal Quíche ubí.
ALMG orthography	Areʼ uxeʼ ojer tzij waral Kʼicheʼ ubʼiʼ.
Ximénez's Spanish translation	Este es el principio de las Antiguas historias aquí en el Quiché.
Tedlock's English translation	"This is the beginning of the ancient word, here in the place called Quiché."

== Morphology ==
Like other Mayan languages, Kʼicheʼ uses two sets of agreement markers, known to Mayanists as "Set A" and "Set B" markers, which can appear on both nouns and verbs. "Set A" markers are used on nouns to mark possessor agreement and on verbs to agree with the transitive subject (ergative case). "Set B" markers are used on verbs to agree with the transitive object or the intransitive subject (absolutive case).

Set A markers
		Before a consonant	Before a vowel
1st person	singular	nu- or in-	w- or inw-
1st person	plural	qa-	q-
2nd person	singular	a-	aw-
2nd person	plural	i-	iw-
3rd person	singular	u-	r-
3rd person	plural	ki-	k-

Set B markers
1st person	singular	in-
1st person	plural	oj- (uj- in some varieties)
2nd person	singular	at-
2nd person	plural	ix-
3rd person	singular	Ø-
3rd person	plural	e- (ebʼ- in some varieties)

Kʼicheʼ also has two second person formal agreement markers: la (singular) and alaq (plural). Unlike the informal agreement markers, the formal agreement markers occur after the verb and verb particles. The formal agreement markers are used on nouns to mark possessor agreement and on both transitive and intransitive verbs for subject and object agreement.

=== Pronouns ===
Kʼicheʼ distinguishes six pronouns classified by person and number. Gender and case are not marked on pronouns, which are often omitted since subject and object agreement are obligatorily marked on the verb.

Subject and object pronouns
		orthography	IPA
1st person	singular	in	/in/
1st person	plural	uj	/uχ/
2nd person	singular	at	/at/
2nd person	plural	ix	/iʃ/
3rd person	singular	areʼ	/aɾeʔ/
3rd person	plural	iyareʼ	/ijaɾeʔ/

Kʼicheʼ has two formal second person pronouns: lal (singular) and alaq (plural).

=== Verbs ===
Kʼicheʼ verbs are morphologically complex and can take numerous prefixes and suffixes, which serve both inflectional and derivational purposes. Agreement follows an ergative/absolutive pattern: subjects of transitive verbs are indexed with Set A markers, while intransitive subjects and transitive objects are indexed with Set B markers. Aspect and mood are also indicated via verbal morphology, as is movement: the prefix ul- in the movement slot indicates movement towards the speaker, and the prefix e- (or bʼe- in some varieties) indicates movement away from the speaker.

The table below shows the inflectional template of a Kʼicheʼ verb.

Example Kʼicheʼ verb inflection
Aspect/mood	Set B (absolutive)	Movement	Set A (ergative)	Stem	Status suffix	
k-	at-			bʼin	-ik	katbʼinik "You walk."
x-	at-		inw-	il	-o	xatinwilo "I saw you."
ch-	Ø-		a-	kʼam	-aʼ	chakʼamaʼ "Carry it!"
k-	Ø-	ul-		waʼ	-oq	kulwaʼoq "S/he comes and eats."

The last morpheme on a verb, the so-called "status suffix", is a portmanteau morpheme, the form of which is determined by a set of rules that includes factors such as:

- whether the verb is transitive or intransitive
- whether the verb's mood is indicative or imperative
- whether or not the verb contains a movement marker
- whether or not the verb falls at the end of an intonational phrase

==== Voice and derivation ====
The examples above involve verbs with simple stems. Verb stems may also be morphologically complex. Complex stems may involve voice suffixes:

- Causative (CA): -isa (-kam- "die", -kam-isa- "kill (someone)")
- Passive (PV): -x (-kuna- "cure (someone)", -kuna-x- "be cured")
- Completive passive (CP): -taj (-kuna- "cure (someone)", -kuna-taj- "be completely cured; recover")
- Absolutive Antipassive (AA): -n, -on or -un (-mes- "sweep (something) clean", -mes-on- "sweep up")
- Focus Antipassive (FA): -n, -ow or -uw (-mes- "sweep (something) clean", -mes-ow- "sweep up")

Also, derivational suffixes may be included, many of which form verb stems from other parts of speech. For instance, the versive suffix -ir or -ar forms verb stems from adjectives: utz "good", -utz-ir- "get good"; nim "big", -nim-ar- "get big." Multiple suffixes can appear within a single stem: -nim-ar- "get big", -nim-ar-isa- "enlarge (something)", -nim-ar-isa-x- "be enlarged."

== Syntax ==
As with all other Mayan languages, Kʼicheʼ has an ergative pattern of verb agreement and often uses verb-object-subject (VOS) word order. Most modern speakers use SOV, SVO, and VSO word orders interchangeably. Language purists have tried to preserve the traditional verb-initial word order, but influence from Spanish (an SVO language) promotes a subject-initial order.

=== Focus Antipassive ===
The Focus Antipassive (FA) is used in Kʼicheʼ when the ergative subject of a transitive verb is in focus. This occurs in several contexts:

{e: are:} ri: winaq k-e:-wok-ow ri: jah
FOC the people INC-ABS.3.PL-build-FA the house
"The people are the ones who build the house."

jachi:n x-0-paxi-n le: laq
who COM-ABS.3.SG-break-FA the bowl
"Who broke the bowl?"

x-0-pe: ri: achi: ri: k-in-toʔ-w-ik
COM-ABS.3.SG-come the man who INC-ABS.1.SG-help-FA-ST.INTR
"The man who helps me came."

This constraint only applies to the subjects of transitive verbs. Subjects of intransitive verbs can be extracted without adding the Focus Antipassive:

jachi:n x-0-pe:t-ik
who COM-ABS.3.SG-come-ST.INTR
"Who came?"

Mondloch (1981) provides an extensive discussion of the exceptions to the constraint on the extraction of ergative subjects. Further discussions of the Focus Antipassive in Kʼicheʼ appear in Larsen (1987), Pye (1989) and Hale (1998).

=== Verb Complementation ===
Kʼicheʼ has finite and non-finite types of verb complement clauses.

==== Finite complement clause ====
k-0-r-a:j k-0-u-ti:j ju:n saqmol.
INC-ABS.3.SG-ERG.3.SG-want INC-ABS.3.SG-ERG.3.SG-eat one egg
"S/he wants to eat an egg."

==== Non-finite complement clauses ====
Kʼicheʼ uses nominalized verbs in non-finite complement clauses. Nominalized verbs are nouns and are used as such, e.g. after a preposition. Mondloch claims that Kʼicheʼ does not have a way to nominalize transitive verbs directly. Transitive verbs must be converted to intransitive verbs by a passive or antipassive change in voice before they can be nominalized (1981:101).

x-0-a:-maji-j aq’an-e:m ch-u-wi: taq le: che:ʔ
COM-ABS.3.SG-ERG.2.SG-begin-ST.TR climb-NOM.INTR to-ERG.3.SG-top PL the tree
"You began to climb to the tree tops."

e:-b’e:-naq ri: winaq pa muq-un-ik
ABS.3.PL-go-PERF.INTR the people to bury-ABS-NOM.INTR
"The people have gone to bury."

== Baby talk ==
Contrary to how many other languages use high pitch in child directed speech (baby talk), Kʼicheʼ babytalk has been shown not to use high pitch. Mayans, in fact, lower their pitch slightly when they speak to children since in Quiche Mayan culture, high pitch is very often used to address people of high status.

== Child language ==
There is extensive documentation of child language acquisition for Kʼicheʼ. Overviews of language development in Kʼicheʼ can be found in Pye (1992, 2017) and Pye and Rekart (1990). Child language data for Kʼicheʼ have overturned most theories of language development and demonstrate the need for more extensive documentation of indigenous languages.

Kʼicheʼ children produce a higher proportion of nouns than children acquiring other Mayan languages. Twenty-six percent of words produced by a two-year-old Kʼicheʼ child were common nouns, while 7 percent were intransitive verbs and 6 percent were transitive verbs (Pye, Pfeiler and Mateo Pedro 2017). Fifteen percent of two-year-old children’s words have the form consonant vowel (CV), while two thirds of their words have the form CVC (Pye 1991).

Two-year-old Kʼicheʼ children produce the consonants /m, n, p, t, ch, k, ʔ, j, l/, and /w/. They produce the bilabial implosive consonant as /b/. Children produce /k/ and /ʔ/ in place of /q/, /x/ in place of /s/, /l/ in place of /r/, and /ch/ in place of /tz/. Kʼicheʼ children begin producing ejective consonants after they are three years old (Pye, Ingram and List 1987). The early production of /ch/ and /l/ in Kʼicheʼ, as well as the late production of /s/, overturns predictions that all children have similar phonologies due to articulatory development.

The acquisition of morphology in Kʼicheʼ is heavily influenced by prosody (Pye 1980, 1983). Primary stress is word-final in Kʼicheʼ and two-year-old children favor the production of word-final syllables with the form CVC. Children do not consistently produce inflectional prefixes on nouns and verbs before they are four years old, although they consistently produce the status suffixes on verbs by the time they are two years old. Their production of the status suffixes is evidence that two-year-old Kʼicheʼ children understand the complex grammatical constraints on the use of status suffixes. They distinguish between the use of the suffixes in phrase-final and phrase-medial positions, the forms of status suffixes for intransitive, root transitive and derived transitive verbs, as well as the distinction between the suffixes for indicative and imperative verbs.

The children’s utterances with the existential verb k’o:lik ("it exists") illustrate their status suffix expertise. The existential verb in Kʼicheʼ belongs to the positional verb class. In phrase-final contexts, it has the root k’o:, the positional suffix -l, and the intransitive status suffix -ik. Only the root is used in phrase-medial contexts, e.g. k’o: ta:j ("it doesn't exist"). For the most part, Kʼicheʼ children produce the phrase-medial and phrase-final forms of the existential verb in their appropriate contexts. They frequently produce the final, stressed syllable /lik/ of the existential in phrase-final contexts, omitting the root entirely (Pye 1991). The children’s facility in producing the status suffixes on verbs overturns predictions that children begin by producing lexical roots before they add inflectional morphemes. The alternation between the phrase-medial and phrase-final productions demonstrates the children’s use of distinct verb forms in their appropriate contexts rather than generalizing a rote verb form.

The children’s production of verb status suffixes also demonstrates their early recognition of the distinction between intransitive and transitive verbs in Kʼicheʼ. This distinction is a core feature of Kʼicheʼ grammar, and underpins the ergative morphology on the verbs and nouns. The semantic diversity of the verbs and positionals overturns the hypothesis that children use prototypical activity scenes as a basis for constructing grammatical categories. The children’s grammatical acumen is best seen in their use of the ergative and absolutive agreement prefixes on verbs. Although three-year-old Kʼicheʼ speakers produce the ergative and absolutive person markers on verbs in 50 percent or less of their obligatory contexts, they do not use the ergative markers on intransitive verbs or vice versa (Pye 1990, 1991). The children’s production of ergative morphology overturns proposals that children begin language acquisition with a single grammatical category of subject.

Kʼicheʼ adults rarely produce utterances with both subject and object using the unmarked verb object subject (VOS) word order. The children likewise frequently omit one or both verb arguments. Two-year-old children omit the subject in 90 percent of utterances with transitive verbs, in 84 percent of utterances with intransitive verbs, and omit the object in 60 percent of utterances with transitive verbs. The children most frequently produced VSO utterances in the few instances in which they produced overt subjects and objects (Pye 1991, 2017).

Although the majority of the children’s utterances have verbs in the active voice, they begin producing verbs in the other voices by the time they are two years old. The children produce a variety of verbs in a variety of voices, which is evidence of their productive use of voice alternation as a grammatical resource. They use verbs in the active, passive and antipassive voices. Three and four-year-old children responded appropriately in a pointing task that tested their comprehension of Focus Antipassive questions (Pye 1991; Pye and Quixtan Poz 1988).

The acquisition data for Kʼicheʼ and other Mayan languages have profound implications for language acquisition theory (Pye, Pfeiler and Mateo Pedro 2017). Children demonstrate an early proficiency with verb inflection in languages with a rich morphology and where the language’s prosodic structure highlights the morphology. The Kʼicheʼ children’s use of status suffixes shows that two-year-olds are capable of using semantically abstract affixes appropriately. This morphology accounts for the language-specific look of the children’s early utterances and guides its development in later stages.

== Loanwords in other languages ==
The UTZ label for sustainable farming got its name from utz kapeh ("good coffee").
