= Kʼicheʼ people =

Ethnic group, one of the Maya peoples

Kʼicheʼ
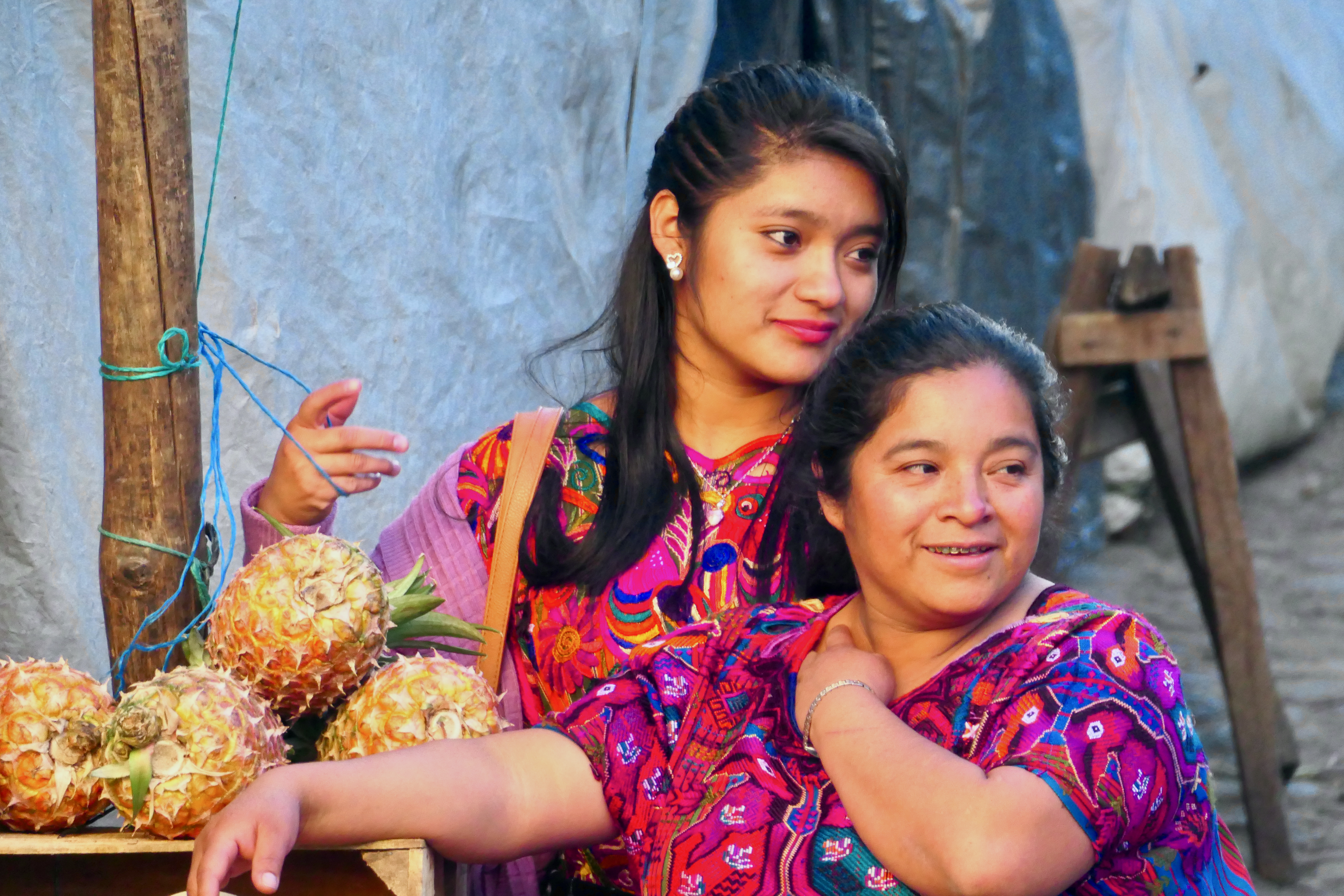
- Kʼicheʼ women at the market in Chichicastenango

Total population
- 1,680,551 (11.28% of the Guatemalan population)

Regions with significant populations
- Guatemala: 1,680,551
- Quiché: 570,985
- Totonicapán: 405,765
- Quetzaltenango: 227,663
- Sololá: 180,488
- Suchitepéquez: 143,396
- United States

Languages
- Kʼicheʼ, Spanish

Religion
- Roman Catholic, Evangelical, Maya religion

Related ethnic groups
- Kaqchikel, Tzutujil, Uspantek, Sakapultek

The Kʼicheʼ (pronounced [kʼiˈtʃeʔ]; Spanish spelling: Quiché) are an Indigenous people of the Americas and one of the main Maya peoples. They are primarily found in the highlands of Guatemala. The eponymous Kʼicheʼ language is a Mesoamerican language in the Mayan language family. The highland Kʼicheʼ polities in the pre-Columbian era are associated with the ancient Maya civilization, and reached the peak of their power and influence during the Mayan Postclassic period (c. 950–1539 AD). This language is used as an official language in Guatemala with Spanish.

The meaning of the word Kʼicheʼ in the Kʼicheʼ language is "many trees". The Nahuatl translation, Cuauhtēmallān "Place of the Many Trees (People)", is the origin of the word Guatemala. Quiché Department is also named after them. Rigoberta Menchú Tum, an activist for Indigenous rights who won the Nobel Peace Prize in 1992, is perhaps the best-known Kʼicheʼ person.

== People ==
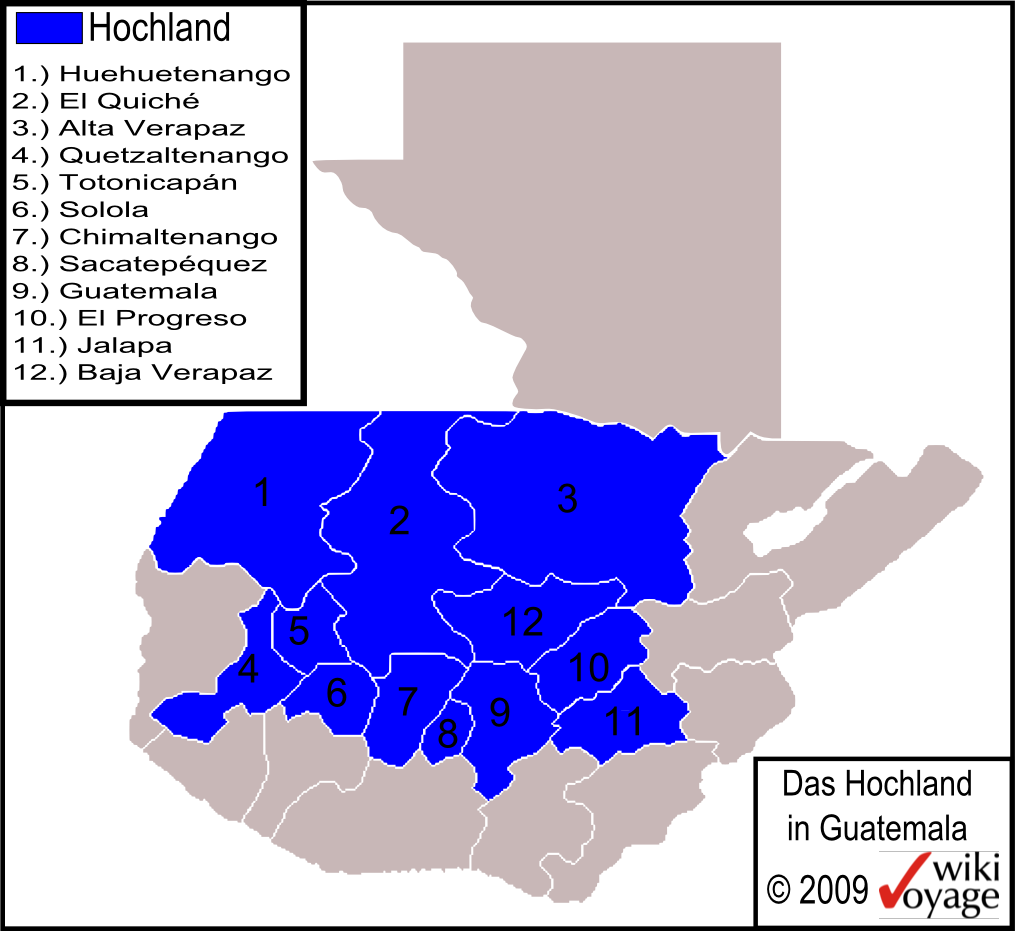
The departments labeled 2, 4, 5, and 6 are where many Kʼicheʼ live

According to the 2018 census, Kʼicheʼ people constituted 11% of the Guatemalan population, accounting for 1,610,551 people out of a total of 14,901,286 people. The large majority of Kʼicheʼ people live in the western highlands of Guatemala, a region roughly corresponding to the former state of Los Altos. In Guatemala, they primarily live in the departments of Totonicapán (97% Kʼicheʼ), El Quiché (60% Kʼicheʼ), Quetzaltenango (28% Kʼicheʼ), Sololá (43% Kʼicheʼ), and Suchitepéquez (26% Kʼicheʼ).

El Quiché forms the heartland of the Kʼicheʼ people. In pre-Columbian times, the Kʼicheʼ settlements and influence reached beyond the highlands, including the valley of Antigua and coastal areas in Escuintla.

Most Kʼicheʼ speak their native language and have at least a working knowledge of Spanish. Exceptions are in some remote and isolated rural communities, where the people speak only Kʼicheʼ. Maya languages closely related to Kʼicheʼ are Uspantek, Sakapultek, Kaqchikel and Tzutujil.

== History ==
The history of the Kʼicheʼ people can be divided into two main historical periods, pre-conquest and post-conquest. Conquest occurred in 1524 with the arrival of the conquistador Pedro de Alvarado, who conducted war against this people.

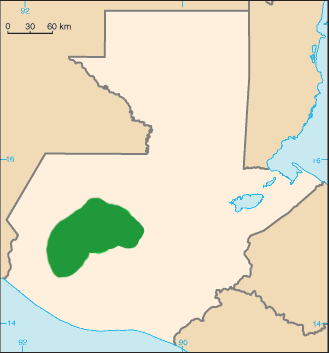
Location of the Kʼiche population in Guatemala

=== Pre-conquest ===
In pre-conquest times, the Kʼicheʼ Kingdom of Qʼumarkaj was one of the most powerful states in the region. Kʼiche' was an independent state that existed after the decline of the Maya Civilization with the Classic collapse (c.300 – c.950 AD). Kʼicheʼ lay in a highland mountain valley of present-day Guatemala; during this time they were also found in parts of El Salvador.

The major city of the Kʼicheʼ in the western highlands of Guatemala was Qʼumarkaj. It was the political, ceremonial and social center of the Kʼicheʼ people. The city covered an estimated area of 3.25 km^{2} across the Resguardo plateau. There is also evidence for a large degree of cultural exchange between the Kʼicheʼ and the people of Central Mexico. Linguists have found Nahuatl influences in the Kʼicheʼ language. Up until the 16th century before conquest K'iche were a literate civilization, creating glyphs and pictographs which helped preserve their culture.

=== Post-conquest ===
The Kʼicheʼ were conquered by the conquistador Pedro de Alvarado in 1524. Their last military commander, Tecun Uman, led the Kʼicheʼ armies against the combined forces of Alvarado and his allies, the Kaqchikel. The battle took place in the valley of Xelajú (Quetzaltenango) where the Kʼicheʼ armies were defeated and close to 10,000 Kʼicheʼ died, including Tecún Umán. Tecún has since been an important legendary figure in the Kʼicheʼ oral tradition. After the battle, the Kʼicheʼ surrendered and invited Alvarado to their capital, Qʼumarkaj. However, Alvarado suspected an ambush and had the city burned. The ruins of the city can still be seen, just a short distance from Santa Cruz del Quiché.

One of the main missions of the Spanish clergy during the conquest was to convert the Mesoamerican people to Catholic Christianity. Though they never fully converted the people, they did affect their language. The Kʼicheʼ people were one of the first groups studied by the Catholic missionary religious order known as the Dominicans. The Franciscans established Theologia Indorum, a Christian theology text written in the Kʼicheʼ native language and adapting K'iche' concepts to Catholicism. The text was meant to be a tool for converting the Kʼicheʼ and other Mesoamerican groups to Christianity. To accomplish this, the Dominicans attempted to change the meaning of some native words to better reflect their Catholic concepts. They also used similar word, sentence, and rhythmic structure to the Popol Vuh to create similarities between the texts.

=== Twentieth century ===
In the early 1980s, the government of Guatemala, under the leadership of Efraín Ríos Montt, carried out a massive campaign to quell both the rebellions largely organized by the Mayan people and the spread of liberation ideas inspired by the Catholic church. Because the K'iche' are the largest Maya group within Guatemala, they became a major target of the counterinsurgency programs, which developed into what is now known as the Guatemalan genocide. The tactics of the Guatemalan army to fight the insurgency ranged from desecrating sacred symbols and burning crops, to raping Mayan women, mutilating and displaying Mayan bodies, and coercing Mayan men into Civil Defense Patrols. According to the Guatemalan Historical Clarification Commission, Maya people in Southern Él Quiché were 98.4% of total victims.

Because of the disproportionate targeting of native peoples, the K'iche' people who inhabit Southern Él Quiché continue to be affected by the government's counterinsurgency programs. However, scholars have pointed out the differences between Western ideas of trauma and the Mesoamerican understanding. The Guatemalan Historical Clarification Commission has emphasized the need for mental health solutions that highlight community development and human rights. Previous efforts to provide relief have included encouraging natives to provide testimonies on Ríos Montt's actions, reburying family members who were previously thrown in mass graves, and training community volunteers to accompany affected people and provide support.

=== Twenty-first century ===
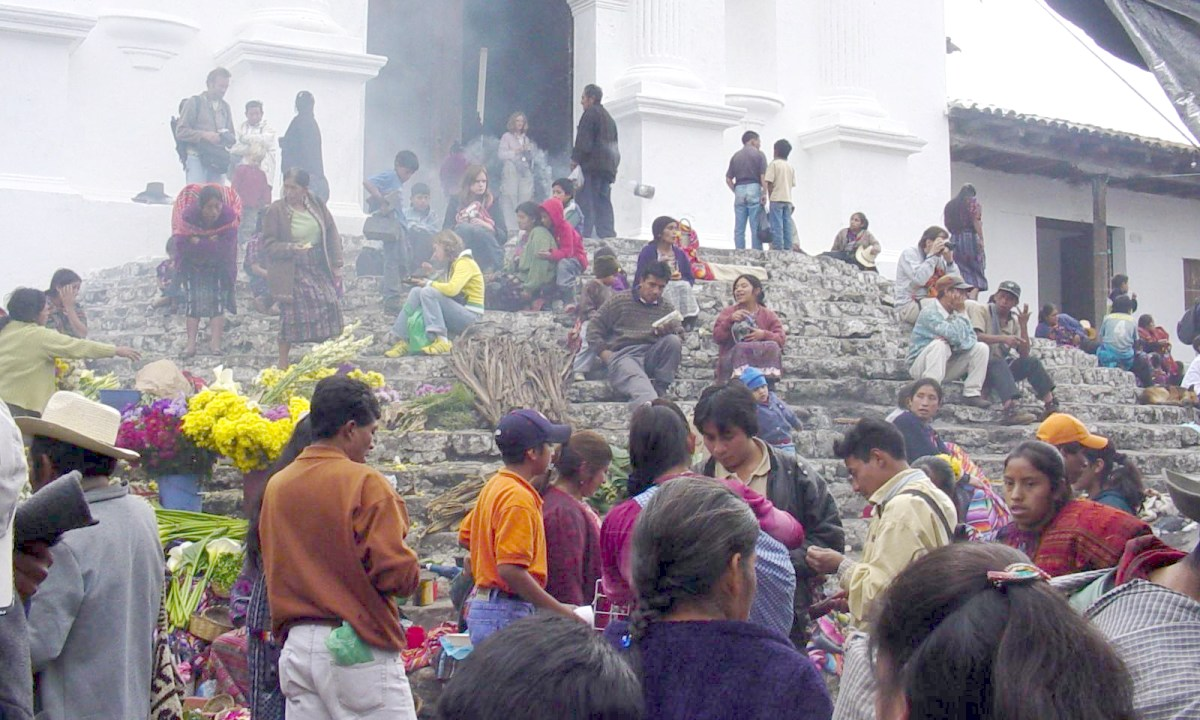
Market day in the Kʼicheʼ town of Chichicastenango

Up until 2012, Ríos Montt served in Congress, which granted him immunity from prosecution. In 2013, Ríos Montt and his armed forces were charged with the massacres of 15 villages in the K'iche' area. Ríos Montt declared innocence throughout the trial, and was convicted for crimes against humanity and sentenced to 80 years in prison. Ríos Montt's conviction was overturned by Constitutional court due to lobbying by the country's business elite, issuing a retrial that was delayed when a judge recused herself. Eventually in 2017, the retrial began but since Ríos Montt was diagnosed with dementia, the trial was closed to the public, and Ríos Montt was not required to be there. He died in his home while the trial was ongoing, in April 2018.

== Notable figures ==
=== Kʼicheʼ rulers ===
The origin of the elite Kʼicheʼ rulers is debated but scholars widely believe that the warlords traveled to the Guatemalan highlands in AD 1225. They began their migration after the collapse of the Yucatàn Maya center of Chichén Itzá, which is believed to have taken place around AD 1200. The elite warlords followed the Río Usumacinta drainage, the Río Negro, and Río Agua Caliente until they crossed into the San Andres Basin, where they began early Kʼicheʼ settlements. These warlords were in small groups that were very mobile and consisted mostly of men. They began to intermingle with the local Kʼicheʼ populations soon after their arrival. A chronological list of the rulers can be made by using generation lengths from the first ruler and so on.

Kʼicheʼ rulers
Dates (AD)	Name
1225–1250	Bʼalam Kitze
1250–1275	Kʼokʼoja
1275–1300	E Tzʼikim
1300–1325	Ajkan
1325–1350	Kʼokaibʼ
1350–1375	Kʼonache
1375–1400	Kʼotuja
1400–1425	Quqʼkumatz
1425–1475	Kʼiqʼabʼ
1475–1500	Vahxakʼ iKaam
1500–1524	Oxib Kej

=== Tecun Uman ===
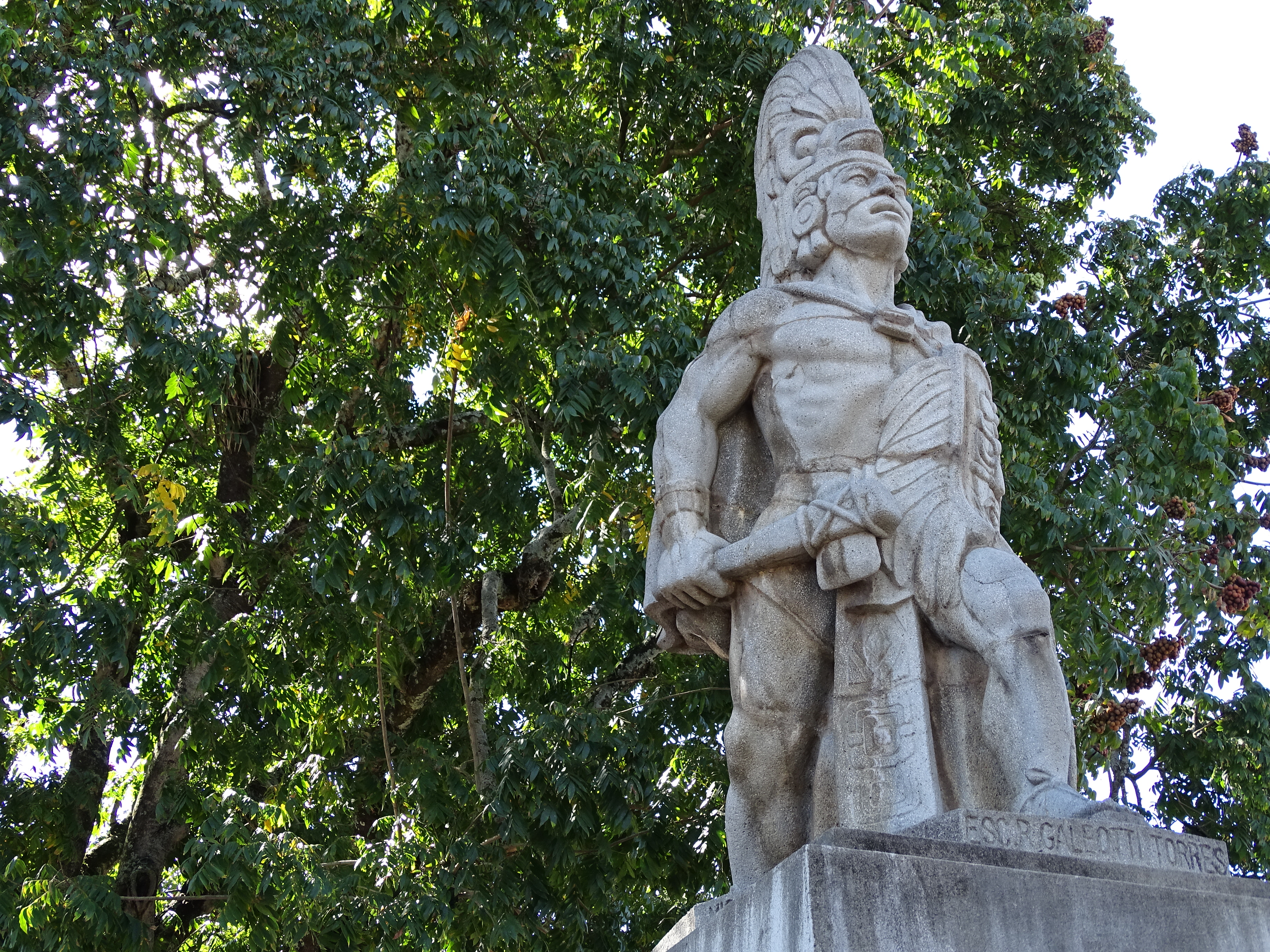
A statue of Tecun Uman in the central plaza of Santa Cruz del Quiche, Guatemala

Declared Guatemala's national hero in 1960, Tecun Uman was the last of the K'iche' rulers. His death on February 20, 1524 is memorialized each year by the Guatemalan people. This is done, in part, through the Dance of the Conquest, which tells the story of the natives' conversion to Christianity following the Spanish Conquest. K'iche' documents, such as the Título Xecul, detail his immense wealth, stating that he wore quetzal feathers, rare gems, and abundant jewelry.

Some scholars doubt the existence of Tecun Uman as a historical figure, citing stories of the leader flying as a quetzal or an eagle in K'iche' stories. Other scholars claim that, instead, Tecun Uman's legacy is the result of a mythologized version of a historical figure.

=== Rigoberta Menchú Tum ===
Rigoberta Menchú Tum is an Indigenous rights activist who was awarded the Nobel Peace Prize in 1992. As a young woman, Menchu began advocating for the women's rights movement through the Catholic Church in Guatemala. She later joined the Committee for Peasant Unity (CUC) along with her father to advocate for better labor conditions for farmers. During the rule of General Efrain Rios Montt, Menchú protested the government's counterinsurgency programs with her family, claiming that they were the result of cultural and socioeconomic tensions. After her father, mother, and brother were murdered by the Guatemalan government for their involvement in these protests, Menchú fled to Mexico. While in exile, she published her autobiography, which highlighted the Guatemalan Civil War and the violence committed against her family and the K'iche' people.

In 1996, Rigoberta Menchu became a UN Ambassador for the world's Indigenous peoples and helped promote the first International Decade of the World's Indigenous People. Since then, she has run for President of Guatemala in both 2007 and 2011 as a member of the left-leaning Winaq party but lost both elections by a large majority.

=== Luis Enrique Sam Colop ===
Luis Enrique Sam Colop is a K'iche'an writer who is most known for his accomplishment in translating the Popol Vuh from K'iche' into modern Spanish while bringing back the original poetry element. Sam was born a native K'iche' speaker and also learned Spanish. He attended Rafael Landivar University in Guatemala, graduating with a degree in law. He holds a doctorate in English from the State University of New York with a dissertation on Mayan poetry. For his work on the Popol Vuh, he received a grant from the John Simon Guggenheim Memorial Foundation for advanced professionals.

=== María Telón ===
María Telón is a film and stage actress. She made her debut in the film Ixcanul in 2015, receiving the Best Actress award at the Bratislava International Film Festival and other international film festivals. Telón also appeared in Marvel's Black Panther: Wakanda Forever, playing an elderly Maya woman.

=== Irma Alicia Velásquez Nimatuj ===
Irma Alicia Velásquez Nimatuj is a renowned anthropologist and university professor who became the first Guatemalan indigenous woman to earn a PhD. In 2002, she filed the first racial discrimination complaint after being refused entry to a tavern in Guatemala City because she was wearing a regional clothing, which sparked a political debate on racial discrimination that culminated in the criminalisation of racial discrimination. Subsequently, she has been an advisor to UN Women in Latin America and the Caribbean and has been a witness Tribunal of Conscience against Sexual Violence against Women during the Armed Conflict.

== Literature ==
=== Popol Vuh ===
One of the most significant surviving Mesoamerican literary documents and primary sources of knowledge about Maya societal traditions, beliefs and mythology is a product of the 16th-century Kʼicheʼ people. This document, known as the Popol Vuh ("Pop wuj" in proper Kʼiche – "the book of events") and originally written around the 1550s, contains a compilation of mythological and ethno-historical narratives known to these people at that time. These were drawn from earlier pre-Columbian sources (now lost) and also oral traditions. This sacred narrative includes their creation myth, relating how the world and humans were created by the gods, the story of the divine brothers, and the history of the Kʼicheʼ from their migration into their homeland up to the Spanish conquest.

The Popol Vuh, from its creation to present day, has developed as an important symbol of Indigenous culture for both present-day Guatemalans and people of Mayan descent. This sacred text has been used in religious and spiritual ceremonies, university studies, political movements and protests, and historical research into the lives of the Mayans and, more specifically, the Kʼicheʼ people. In 1971 it was declared the official book of Guatemala. The Popol Vuh has been used by people of Mayan descent in present-day Guatemala to defend their traditional lands and political rights in order to preserve their Indigenous culture. To this day, the Popol Vuh continues to be analyzed and studied to better understand the spiritual beliefs and practices of the Maya, and how these have shaped present-day cultures.

== See also ==
- Maya Hero Twins
- Spanish conquest of the Maya
- Spanish conquest of Guatemala

== Bibliography ==
- Carmack, Robert M. (1973). Quichéan Civilization: The Ethnohistoric, Ethnographic and Archaeological sources. Berkeley and Los Angeles: University of California Press. ISBN 0-520-01963-6. OCLC 649816.
- Carmack, Robert M. (1981). The Quiché Mayas of Utatlán: The Evolution of a Highland Guatemala Kingdom. Civilization of the American Indian series, no. 155. Norman: University of Oklahoma Press. ISBN 0-8061-1546-7. OCLC 6555814.
- Coe, Michael D. (1999). The Maya. Ancient peoples and places series (6th edition, fully revised and expanded ed.). London and New York: Thames & Hudson. ISBN 0-500-28066-5. OCLC 59432778.
