= Baile de la Conquista =

Traditional Guatemalan dance

The Baile de la Conquista or Dance of the Conquest is a traditional folkloric dance from Guatemala. The dance reenacts the invasion led by Spanish conquistador Pedro de Alvarado and his confrontation with Tecun Uman, ruler of K'iche' kingdom of Q'umarkaj. Although the dance is more closely associated with Guatemalan traditions, it has been performed in early colonial regions of Latin America at the urging of Catholic friars and priests, as a method of converting various native populations and African slaves to the Catholic Church.

== The dance ==
=== Origins ===
The dance is based upon the Spanish Baile de los Moros ("Dance of the Moors") which recounts and commemorates the expulsion of the Moorish rule from Spain. The Baile de la Conquista borrows its structure directly from the Baile de los Moros.

=== Baile de la Conquista in Guatemala ===
The dance begins in Q'umarkaj (also known by its Nahuatl translation, Utatlán), the capital of the kingdom, where the Rey K'iche' ("King K'iche'") receives word of the Spaniards' approach from Aztec ruler Moctezuma II in Tenochtitlan. The king then sends his sons and daughters to Xelajuj Noj (now Quetzaltenango) to recruit Tecun Uman to lead the army against the approaching foes. Following scenes depict the K'iche' chieftains and then the Spanish officers swearing allegiance to their respective leaders. Soon after, a battle ensues between the Spanish and native troops, culminating with the battle between Alvarado and Tecún Umán. The K'iche' army is soon defeated, and echoing the Baile de los Moros, the dance concludes as the K'iche' warriors submit peaceably to Spanish rule and embrace Christianity.

The confrontation between Tecun Uman and Pedro de Alvarado is the central theme of the Guatemalan version of the Baile de la Conquista.

=== Tecun Uman ===
The true existence of a historical Tecun Uman is subject of ongoing debate. One piece of evidence to suggest he lived comes from a letter written by Alvarado to Hernán Cortés. However, the letter is quite sparing in details, with Alvarado only mentioning of the battle that ensued: "in this affair one of the four chiefs of the city of Utatlán was killed, who was the captain general of all this country." Alvarado did not provide a name for the K'iche' general, nor did he mention how or by whose hand the man was killed.

Several other indigenous documents describe the arrival of Alvarado in what would become Guatemala, including the Título C'oyoi which describes the battle in terms similar to the modern legend. This document also contains the earliest known reference to the K'iche' leader as Tecum Umam.

The Popol Vuh confirms the observations of Bartolomé de las Casas and the Título de Totonicapán, which record that four lords ruled the K'iche' at the time of the Spanish conquest. The first-born son of the Keeper of the Mat (the most powerful of the lords) was expected to prove himself by leading the K'iche' army and was given the title "nima rajpop achij", the same title given to Tecun Uman in the Título K'oyoi. This is all tied together by the genealogy of the K'iche' lords that is given near the end of the Popul Vuh and a section of the Título de Totonicapan, which both refer to the son of the Keeper of the Mat as "Tecum" at the time of Alvarado's arrival.

A second explanation for the absence of greater detail in Alvarado's letter is that Tecun Uman actually did battle with one of Alvarado's subordinates by the name of Argueta. This suggestion is based on the claim of Argueta's descendants that the lance they keep as an heirloom of their predecessor is stained with the blood of the K'iche' hero.

Since there is little documentation to prove the existence of a lord named Tecun Uman, it has been suggested that his name was created in order to replace the role of the "Moorish prince", the central antagonist of the Baile de los Moros.

This theory has yet to be proven, and is given little attention in light of pre-existing documents speaking of a historical Tecun Uman long before the first performances of Baile de la Conquista.

=== Variations ===
The Baile de la Conquista is not unique to Guatemala; variations of the dance have been performed throughout Latin America with differences based on local folklore. The one constant in all forms of the dance is the resolution, a religious conversion of the native or "pagan" population. Surviving dances outside of Guatemala are usually performed to honor a town’s patron saint.

== See also ==
- Maya dance
