= Chitinamit =

Archeological site in Guatemala

Coordinates: 15.2892°N 91.0892°W

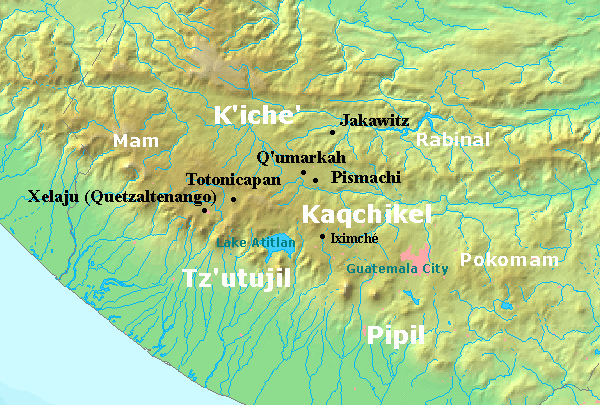
Chitinamit is marked as Jakawitz on this map of the Postclassic Maya highlands

Chitinamit (or Chitinamit-Chujuyup) is an archeological site of the Maya civilization in the highlands of Guatemala. It has been identified as Jakawitz, the first capital of the K'iche' Maya. The site is located in the El Quiché department, in the municipality of Uspantán. Chitinamit dates from the Early Classic through to the Late Postclassic periods and covers approximately 2 hectares (220,000 sq ft), making it the largest site in its region.

== Site description ==
The site overlooks the Queca River in a rugged region that is considered particularly poor for agriculture, it is therefore likely that the mountain-top location was selected because it was readily defensible. The site is located on the mountain of Chujuyup, on the western edge of the Chuyujup Valley and was excavated in 1977 by Kenneth Brown of the University of Houston. It is defended by a stone rampart and possesses stone terraces, together with a ballcourt and a temple to the K'iche' patron god, also named Jakawitz. Its occupation seems to have come to a violent end, with many projectile points being found together with evidence of the burning of buildings.

Chitinamit includes residential structures measuring roughly 3 by 7 metres (9.8 by 23.0 ft) with the walls marked out with vertical schistose slabs measuring approximately 15 centimetres (5.9 in) high. These structures differ from the architectural style of the original Maya population and are presumed to represent the style of intrusive K'iche' lineages. The site is arranged around an enclosed plaza.

== See also ==
- Cerro Quiac
- Chojolom
- K'iche' Kingdom of Q'umarkaj
- Q'umarkaj
