= Spanish conquest of the Kingdom of Q'umarkaj =

Part of the Spanish conquest of Guatemala

The Spanish conquest of the Kingdom of Q'umarkaj took place in the K'iche' Kingdom of Q'umarkaj in 1524 between the Spanish and K'iche'. In 1524, conquistador Pedro de Alvarado arrived in Guatemala with 135 horsemen, 120 footsoldiers and 400 Aztec, Tlaxcaltec and Cholultec allies, and were offered help by the Kaqchikels. Tecun Uman prepared 8,400 soldiers for the Spanish attack, which they had discovered because of their network of spies. After several defeats over the K'iche' people, the Spanish entered Q'umarkaj and the Lords of Q'umarkaj were burnt alive by Alvarado. Following the war, two Spanish noblemen were put in charge of Q'umarkaj, although some fighting continued until 1527.
