= Kiche =

Kiche may refer to:

- Kʼicheʼ (disambiguation), several uses
- Kiche, village in Dagestan

== See also ==
- Quiche (disambiguation)
