= Kʼicheʼ (disambiguation) =

Kʼicheʼ, Kʼicheeʼ or Quiché may refer to:

- Kʼicheʼ people of Guatemala and Mexico, a subgroup of the Maya
- Kʼicheʼ language, a Maya language spoken by the Kʼicheʼ people
  - Classical Kʼicheʼ, the 16th century form of the Kʼicheʼ language
- Kʼicheʼ kingdom of Qʼumarkaj, a pre-Columbian state in the Guatemalan highlands

== See also ==
- Quiche (disambiguation)
