= Tecun Uman =

Mayan emperor of Guatemala (1500-1524)

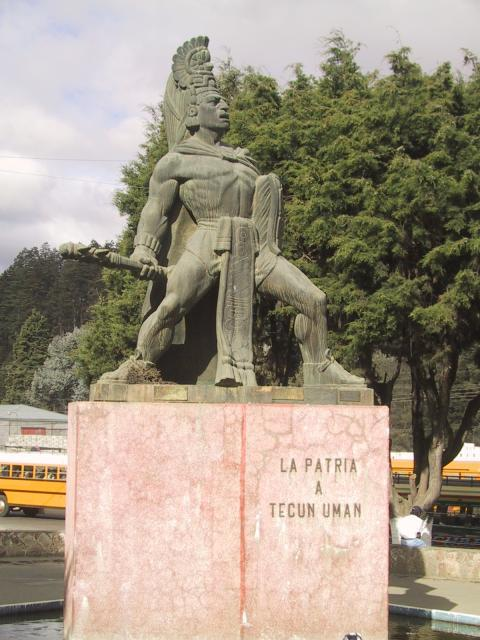
- A statue of the last Quiché Maya ruler, Tecún Umán, in Quetzaltenango, Guatemala.
- Born: 1499; Totonicapán, Guatemala
- Died: February 20, 1524 (aged 24–25); Quetzaltenango

Tecun Uman (1499 – February 20, 1524) was one of the last rulers of the K'iche' Maya people, in the Highlands of what is now Guatemala. According to the Kaqchikel annals, he was slain by Spanish conquistador Pedro de Alvarado while waging battle against the Spanish and their allies on the approach to Quetzaltenango on 12 February 1524.

Tecun Uman was officially declared Guatemala's national hero on 22 March 1960, and is commemorated annually on 20 February, the popular anniversary of his death.

== Battle of El Pinar ==
In 1522, Hernán Cortés sent Mexican allies to scout the Soconusco region of lowland Chiapas, where they met delegations from Iximche and Q'umarkaj at Tuxpán; both of the powerful highland Maya kingdoms declared their loyalty to the King of Spain. But Cortés' allies in Soconusco soon informed him that the K'iche' and the Kaqchikel were not loyal, and were instead harassing Spain's allies in the region. Cortés despatched Pedro de Alvarado with 180 cavalry, 300 infantry, crossbows, muskets, 4 cannons, large amounts of ammunition and gunpowder, and thousands of allied Mexican warriors from Tlaxcala, Cholula and other cities in central Mexico. They arrived in Soconusco in 1523.

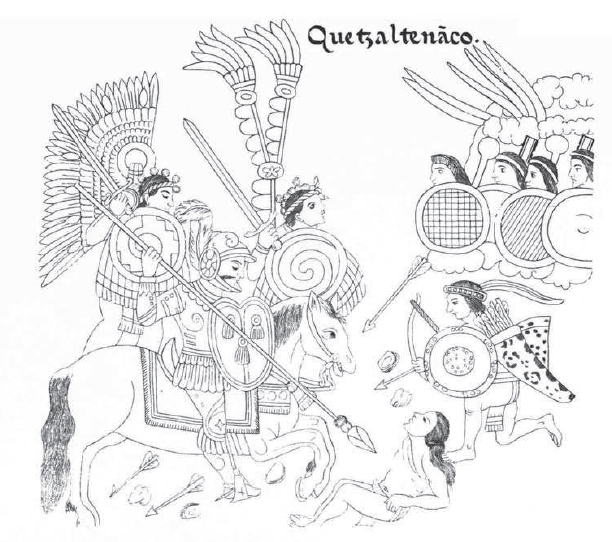
Page from the Lienzo de Tlaxcala showing the conquest of Quetzaltenango

Pedro de Alvarado and his army advanced along the Pacific coast unopposed until they reached the Samalá River in western Guatemala. This region formed a part of the K'iche' kingdom, and a K'iche' army tried unsuccessfully to prevent the Spanish from crossing the river. Once across, the conquistadors ransacked nearby settlements in an effort to terrorise the K'iche'. On 8 February 1524 Alvarado's army fought a battle at Xetulul (called Zapotitlán by his Mexican allies, now San Francisco Zapotitlán). Although suffering many injuries inflicted by defending K'iche' archers, the Spanish and their allies stormed the town and set up camp in the marketplace. Alvarado then turned to head upriver into the Sierra Madre mountains towards the K'iche' heartlands, crossing the pass into the fertile valley of Quetzaltenango.

On 12 February 1524, Alvarado's Mexican allies were ambushed in the pass and driven back by K'iche' warriors but the Spanish cavalry charge that followed was a shock for the K'iche', who had never before seen horses. The cavalry scattered the K'iche' and the army crossed to the city of Xelaju (modern Quetzaltenango), only to find it deserted. Although the common view is that the K'iche' prince Tecun Uman died in the later battle near Olintepeque, the Spanish accounts are clear that at least one and possibly two of the lords of Q'umarkaj died in the fierce battles upon the initial approach to Quetzaltenango. The death of Tecun Uman is said to have taken place in the Battle of El Pinar, and local tradition has his death taking place on the Llanos de Urbina (Plains of Urbina), upon the approach to Quetzaltenango near the modern village of Cantel. Pedro de Alvarado, in his third letter to Hernán Cortés, describes the death of one of the four lords of Q'umarkaj upon the approach to Quetzaltenango. The letter was dated 11 April 1524 and was written during his stay at Q'umarkaj.

=== The legend ===
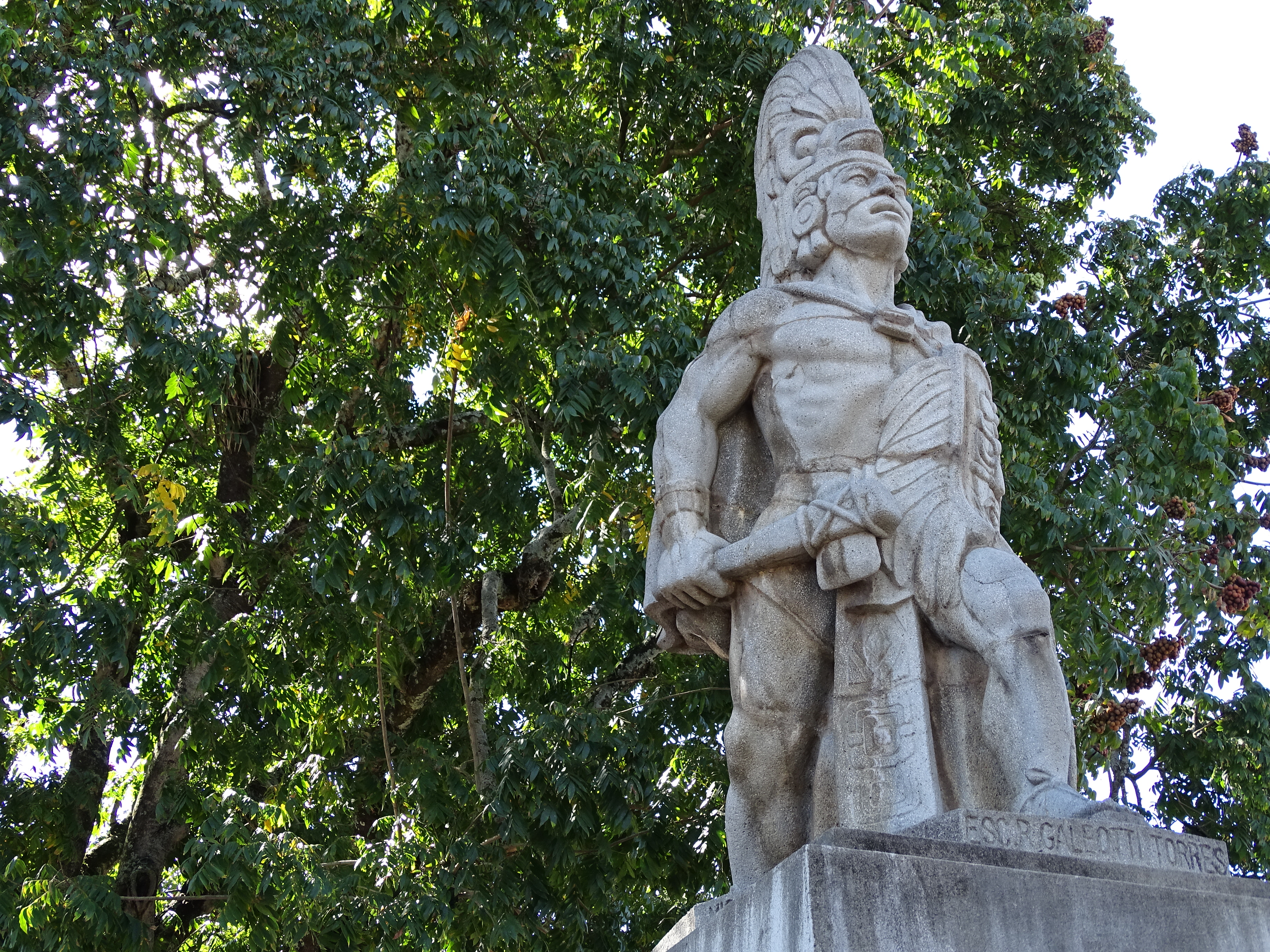
Statue dedicated to Tecún Umán in Quiché

The legends relate that Tecun Uman entered battle adorned with precious quetzal feathers, and that his nahual (animal spirit guide), also a quetzal bird, accompanied him during the battle. In the midst of the battle, Alvarado and Tecun Uman met face to face, each with weapon in hand. Alvarado was clad in armor and mounted on his warhorse. As horses were not native to the Americas and the peoples of Mesoamerica had no beasts of burden of their own, Tecun Uman assumed they were one being and killed Alvarado's horse. Another version says he merely attacked the horse in an attempt to knock Alvarado down, having no prior illusion that man and animal were one and the same. Tecun Uman quickly realized his error and turned for a second attack but Alvarado thrust his spear into his opponent's heart. The K'iche' prince's nahual, filled with grief, landed on the fallen hero's chest, staining its breast feathers red with blood, and thereafter died. From that day on, all male quetzals bear a scarlet breast and their song has not been heard since. Further, if one is to be placed in captivity, it would die, making the quetzal a symbol of liberty.

Another account claims a much more complex confrontation of religious and material forces. In this version Tecun Uman himself literally transformed into a quetzal or, in some variations, into an eagle adorned with three crowns – one of gold, one of diamonds and one of emeralds. Other natives had attempted to kill Alvarado, but he was protected by a powerful maiden, commonly associated with the Virgin Mary. Tecun Uman called upon his own magic, and in the intention of killing Alvarado, struck Alvarado's horse dead. Upon learning he had killed only the beast and not the man, he attempted to correct his mistake, but was quickly impaled by Alvarado's spear.

A different version states Tecun Uman had an opportunity to kill Alvarado but ultimately failed and was slain by one of Alvarado's subordinates, a soldier known by the name of Argueta.

Local folklore from the area around the former K'iche' capital of Q'umarkaj preserves the belief that he was buried at the small archaeological site of Atalaya, 600 metres (660 yd) from Q'umarkaj itself.

== Historical evidence ==
The true existence of a historical Tecun Uman is a subject of ongoing debate. One piece of evidence that suggests he actually lived comes from a letter written by Alvarado to Hernán Cortés. However, the letter is quite sparing in details, with Alvarado only mentioning of the battle that ensued: "in this affair one of the four chiefs of the city of Utatlán was killed, who was the captain general of all this country." Alvarado did not provide a name for the K'iche' general; nor did he mention how or by whose hand the man was killed. Several other indigenous documents describe the arrival of Alvarado in what would become Guatemala, including the Título C'oyoi which describes the battle in terms similar to the modern legend. This document also contains the earliest known reference to the K'iche' leader, as Tecum Umam.

The Popol Vuh confirms the observations of Bartolomé de las Casas and the Título de Totonicapán, which record that four lords ruled the K'iche' at the time of the Spanish conquest. The first-born son of the Keeper of the Mat (the most powerful of the lords) was expected to prove himself by leading the K'iche' army and was given the title "nima rajpop achij", the same title given to Tecun Uman in the Título K'oyoi. This is all tied together by the genealogy of the K'iche' lords that is given near the end of the Popul Vuh and in a section of the Título de Totonicapán, which both refer to the son of the Keeper of the Mat as "Tecum" at the time of Alvarado's arrival.

A second explanation for the absence of greater detail in Alvarado's letter is that Tecun Uman actually did battle with one of Alvarado's subordinates, by the name of Argueta. This suggestion is based on the claim of Argueta's descendants that the lance they keep as an heirloom of their predecessor is stained with the blood of the K'iche' hero.

=== Name ===
It is believed that "Tecun Uman" was more than likely not the ruler's name at all but may have functioned as a sort of title. The earliest recorded appearance of the name is in the Título C'oyoi in which he is referred to as "nima rajpop achij adelantado Tecum umam rey k'iche' don k'iq'ab'." Translated, this phrase means: "great captain-general Tecum, grandson of the K'iche' king Don K'iqab'." Therefore, the word "uman" or "umam" simply means "grandson of" and is not part of Tecun's name at all. It has been suggested that "umam" may have been a reference to his genealogy, or the name may have originally been derived from another title given to the hero, q'uq'umam, meaning "ancient one of quetzal feathers", or it might have come from the indigenous name for a prominent local volcano: "Teyocuman."

=== Baile de la Conquista ===
The Guatemalan Baile de la Conquista ("Dance of the Conquest") is a traditional dance borrowing its structure from the Spanish Baile de los Moros ("Dance of the Moors"), which commemorates the expulsion of the Moors from Spain. The dance is known to have been performed throughout certain regions of colonial Latin America during a time when Catholic priests encouraged its use to aid them in the conversion of various native populations.

In Guatemala, the dance recounts the early events of the conquest, centering on the confrontation between Tecun Uman and Pedro de Alvarado, which in turn serves as a symbol for the much larger conflict in which they were involved. The dance reenacts the invasion led by Alvarado and the conquest of Guatemala. To fit the traditions of the Baile de los Moros, the role of the Moorish prince is replaced with that of Tecun Uman. It has therefore been suggested that the structure of the dance forced them to create a leader for the native armies, with Tecun Uman created specifically for that purpose. This theory is generally given little credence, in light of the observation that such documents as the Título K'oyoi appeared long before the first performances of the Baile de la Conquista.

== National hero ==
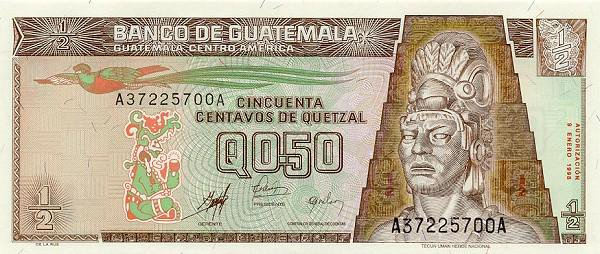
Discontinued 0.50 quetzal banknote of Tecún Umán

Tecun Uman was declared a national hero of Guatemala on March 22, 1960, and is celebrated annually on February 20 for the bravery and dignity he demonstrated in opposition to the Spanish conquistadors. Tecun Uman's namesakes include a small town in the department of San Marcos on the Guatemala–Mexico border (Ciudad Tecún Umán) as well as countless hotels, restaurants, and Spanish schools throughout Guatemala. He is also memorialized in a poem by Miguel Ángel Asturias that bears his name. In contrast to his popularity, he is at times rejected by Maya cultural activists who consider his status as a national hero a source of irony, considering the long history of mistreatment of Guatemala's native population.

== See also ==
- Cerro Quiac
- Kaibil Balam
- Tecunumania, which is a genus of flowering plants belonging to the family Cucurbitaceae, named after the King.
