= Maya dance =

Ceremonial dance in pre-Columbian Maya civilization

In pre-Columbian Mayan civilization, ceremonial dance had great importance. However, since dance is a transient art, it is inherently difficult for archeologists to find and evaluate evidence of its role. There is little material information left behind, beyond a few paintings on murals and vases. This lack of direct evidence leads to several different archaeological interpretations.

Dance was a central component of social, religious, and political endeavors for the ancient Maya. The entire community danced, including kings, nobles, and common people. Dance served many functions such as creating sacred space, closing the gap between here and the otherworld, and releasing the dead from the grasp of the Xibalbans (see Xibalba).

== Overview ==
Dance from pre-Columbian Maya culture still exists in various altered forms today. However, dancing in the ancient world carried a much deeper significance in their sophisticated culture. Records of these dances have come to light through various murals, codices, and especially the Spaniards who first recorded their observations.

Spirits of the super-natural world and their relationship with Maya culture played an important role in ritual dance. Just as well, beasts were usually mimicked in ceremonial dance. The attire worn to some dances as depicted in murals show the links Maya dancers make to the natural world and to their worshipped gods who often took the form of animals. This is evident especially in the frescoes of Bonampak.

The elements as well were worshipped through Maya dance. In the Tzutujil Maya culture, it was believed that a spirit controlled the power of volcanoes. When the mountain began to grumble and shake, the Tzutujil priests would pick young women and girls who would partake in a large dance ceremony before being sacrificed into the burning mountain. Maya dance rituals often included sacrifice. For instance, the Tun-teleche¬ dance included victims whose hearts were removed before they died as a gift to underworld demons. On the other hand, some public ritual dances were even erotic in nature. Common throughout most all dances though was the importance of deities and the relationship between man and god.

Dancing includes many different aspects of other rituals into the moves and actions they do during them. Blood-letting was used to help demonstrate the bravery of the warriors. They would also put their captives in their dances; the captives would be killed in a public ritual normally after the bloodletting. Ball games were also involved in dances. Some ball players would be in similar positions as dancers' sometimes confusing people analyzing them . Instruments were also including in depictions of ball games further supporting the connection of dancing, ball games, and warfare are connected in the life style as they all share very similar depictions of what they are.

In the book of creation, Popol Vuh, it is recounted that the dances of the Twin Brothers were part of a miracle ceremony. Just as well, the dances of 'The Armadillo', 'the Poorwill', and 'the Weasel' pleased the lords of death immensely.

Dance in Maya culture has also acted as a bridge between the ancient and post-Columbian eras. Spanish missionaries and lords as late as the 18th century were trying to eliminate the practice of ancient dance; however, natives maintained roots with their ancestors by practicing in secret. Even after the relatively complete conversion to Catholicism after the Spanish influence arrived, Maya people still respect their ancient deities through ceremonial dance, which has persisted through the generations since the golden age of ancient Maya.

== Research ==
In 1966, Michael D. Coe and Elizabeth P. Benson described a dancing scene showing several important lords standing with one heel raised. In 1992, Nikolai Grube deciphered the glyph for "dance" (read as akʼot) in Maya script. Some interesting depictions of Maya dance of the Classic era are found on Maya ceramics and in the famous murals of Bonampak.

The word was in a picture that depicts Bird Jaguar IV, a Yaxchilan ruler, in a pose that would be described as dancing holding a writhing snake. The words around the man read chan chan or "celestial snake". Many of the texts or stelae would be installed on places that the performance the picture had captured would be ideally done at like platforms, plazas or stairways.

Dancing on designs has been hard to find at first. It has been discovered that pictures of people dancing have been found to be standing still in the pictures or with a leg raised and just barely touching the ground. The physical location of where the image is gives hints to its reason. Symbols around and in the image also give helpful hints to the decoding of the image. Some depictions of dances come in a story like format around temples, like the 40 days after Bird Jaguar IV's accession which spans many panels and includes a few different temples.

Maya dance is depicted in murals in the northwestern highlands of Guatemala. For example, inside a home in Chajul, an Ixil Maya town, a mural likely dating to the late 18th century depicts dancers in elaborate costumes, including long strips attached to their wrists, as a repeated motif. Local families describe specific dances such as Baile de Vaqueros (Cowboys Dance), Baile de la Conquista (Dance of the Conquest), and Baile de Tz'unun (Hummingbird Dance).

In another house, a mural shows three pairs of dancers, each in single file. Researcher Jarosław Zrałka describes their dress: "They all wear the same outfit: long capes, rich headdresses adorned with flowers and plumes, caftans, trousers, and heeled shoes". Each dancer also holds a long black object whose purpose is unknown. Similarly, a third house in Chajul shows "a procession of richly attired dancers with long capes, pants, heeled shoes and long props" but with simpler headdresses. In the same region, dancers appear in murals dating to 1250-1550 CE in palaces of the K'iche' Maya of Q'umarkaaj.

Mexican choreographer Rodolfo Reyes, who specializes in re-creating live performances of Maya rituals with archaeological and ethnological accuracy, uses several sources of evidence to guide his dance choreography. For example, dozens of ancestral dances survive in the Maya highlands, and are still performed today. Reyes studies these living dances, as well as many more across Mexico. He also combines evidence from murals and stone glyphs to guide the performances.

== Technique ==
Ancient Maya dance is often characterized by transformations of human beings into supernatural (god like) beings by means of visionary trance. Some think that hallucinogenic drugs or medicines were used to put the performer into an altered state of mind. Once in this state of mind the participants were transformed into their wayob or soul companions. These soul companions were depicted through the masks and the costumes people wore in the dance. Some scenes are painted on pottery such as that from the myriad ritual meals of Classic festivals. These vessels depict humans, both kings and nobles, dressed in costumes. Their human faces are shown in cutaway view inside the costumes of the fantastic creatures they have become through the transformation of the dance. Some of these wayob are recognizable as animals like jaguars and birds of prey, but others just look like strange monsters.

For the Maya, dance was a very public affair. It induced visionary trances where either individuals or groups went into an altered state of mind that allowed them to communicate with the other world. Those who were strong enough to travel there, told stories about how the land had things like rivers and trees in this world. Some of the great lords depicted themselves dancing out over the abyss that leads into the otherworld.

The distinction between the humans and supernatural beings was never sharply made. Through dance, people became gods and gods became people even if it were only for a moment. These were more than just acts of civic pride or piety. They were considered to be direct connections to the otherworld.

With the written form of dance poses play a big part on how they describe and depict the dance. The gesture of holding the double headed serpent would be described as a gesture of concentration, calm and tranquility. The pose to dancing was discovered to be a lifted heel while still touching the ground. This was discovered in 1911 but was not brought to questions till 1981 by Virginia Miller who defined the pose. This pose was started in the Early Classic period on a small scale while in the eight century started to appear in large scale depiction. This pictures show one heel raised, very rarely is both raised, and the arms in a dynamic pose with the body gazing outwards.

== Writing of dance ==
The "stepping" pose is also closely connected to dance. This pose is a profile of the person with their right foot on the ground while the left is bent with the ball if the foot on the ground. This pose uses much context to discover the meaning. This pose could also be used for walking but the presence of instruments and dance costumes distinguish the two from each other.

The legs are not the only part of the body that mattered when it comes to dance poses. The arm and elbow were used while the hand and fingers are not always shown while almost all people are shown with arms. One dance position of the arms is the arms out towards the way the person is facing or next to the face while another one is a hand by the head with the other on the hip. The arms would be used of the artist did not want to raise the heel of the person while still giving the symbol of dance. The use of just arms as a form of dance is used to show the dancing of someone who is not normally a dancer, like a baby or a god.

With all things there are situations that break the pattern. If the poses for dance are used without certain contexts the meanings of these poses changes. A lifted heel without instruments or dance costumes could be used to describe drunkenness. Warriors and battles also use this pose as a sign to capture enemies as well as to signal a spear being thrown.

== Meanings within dances ==
The Snake Dance was also celebrated by the lords of Palenque. This time the dance was done with a male who has an ax in one hand and a serpent in the other, and a woman who is grasping the lower body of the snake. These dancers wore costumes of First father and First Mother, the deities whose actions enabled the final creation and the birth of all the gods. This depiction is thought to point toward the role of dance in the story of Creation.

The most important instrument of Mayan music is the rain stick.

The story of the Popol Vuh exhibits examples of this idea. After the Hero Twins are killed they come back to life as vagabonds and quickly enchant the people of Xibalba with their dancing and magic. The Twins danced such dances as the Dance of the Poorwill, the Weasel and the Armadillo and they are able to bring things back to life. All of this fame caught the attention of the Lords of Death who command the Twins to perform. As the twins perform, the Lords are amazed by their powers and finally ask the Twins to sacrifice them. The Twins do, but this time they do not bring them back to life, limiting the Xibalbans power over humans forever.

Dancers are very specific on where they do their rituals. Certain dances are more private while other are public events that fill stadiums. One Spanish explorer describes a performance he watched as eight hundred heavy warriors danced in a giant stadium. Not one of the warriors were off beat as they danced all day with food and drink brought to them as they danced. Diego Garcia de Palacio compared a courtyard enclosed by stairways in Copan to the Colosseum in Rome. Dances were mostly public rituals showing community by people being different social classes on stage. These stages were normally large centers, public zones or palace compounds which the elites would use more.

Much of Mayan ceremonial architecture contains pieces of art containing figures doing ritual dances. The architect of these building holds figures of what the rooms are normally used for. Some set of staircase contain pictures of captives walking down them giving the idea the rooms here were used to store prisoners. The East Court of the Acropolis in Copan is believed to have been used for dance rituals. The room was used by a dictionary of colonial Yucatec described the acropolis as a community house where they learned to discuss public interest and well as learn to dance.

== See also ==
- Baile de la Conquista

== Bibliography ==
- Looper, Matthew G. (2009). To be like Gods. Austin, Texas: University of Texas Press. ISBN 978-0-292-70988-1. OCLC 690595806.
- Krystal, Matthew. (2012) Indigenous Dance and Dancing Indians: Contested Representation in the Global Era. University Press of Colorado.
- Castillo, Victor; Źrałka, Jaroslaw (2025). "DANCING BODIES IN THE MAYA HIGHLANDS". The Routledge Companion to Race in Early Modern Artistic, Material, and Visual Production.
- Reyes, Rodolfo (2008). "Ancient Maya Dance". Archaeology. 61 (3): 16.
- Zrałka, Jarosław; Banach, Monika; Castillo, Víctor (2025). "Recent investigations on the unique Maya wall paintings from Chajul (Guatemala)". Estudios de cultura maya. 65: 119–153.
