= Cantel, Guatemala =

Cantel
- Municipality and town
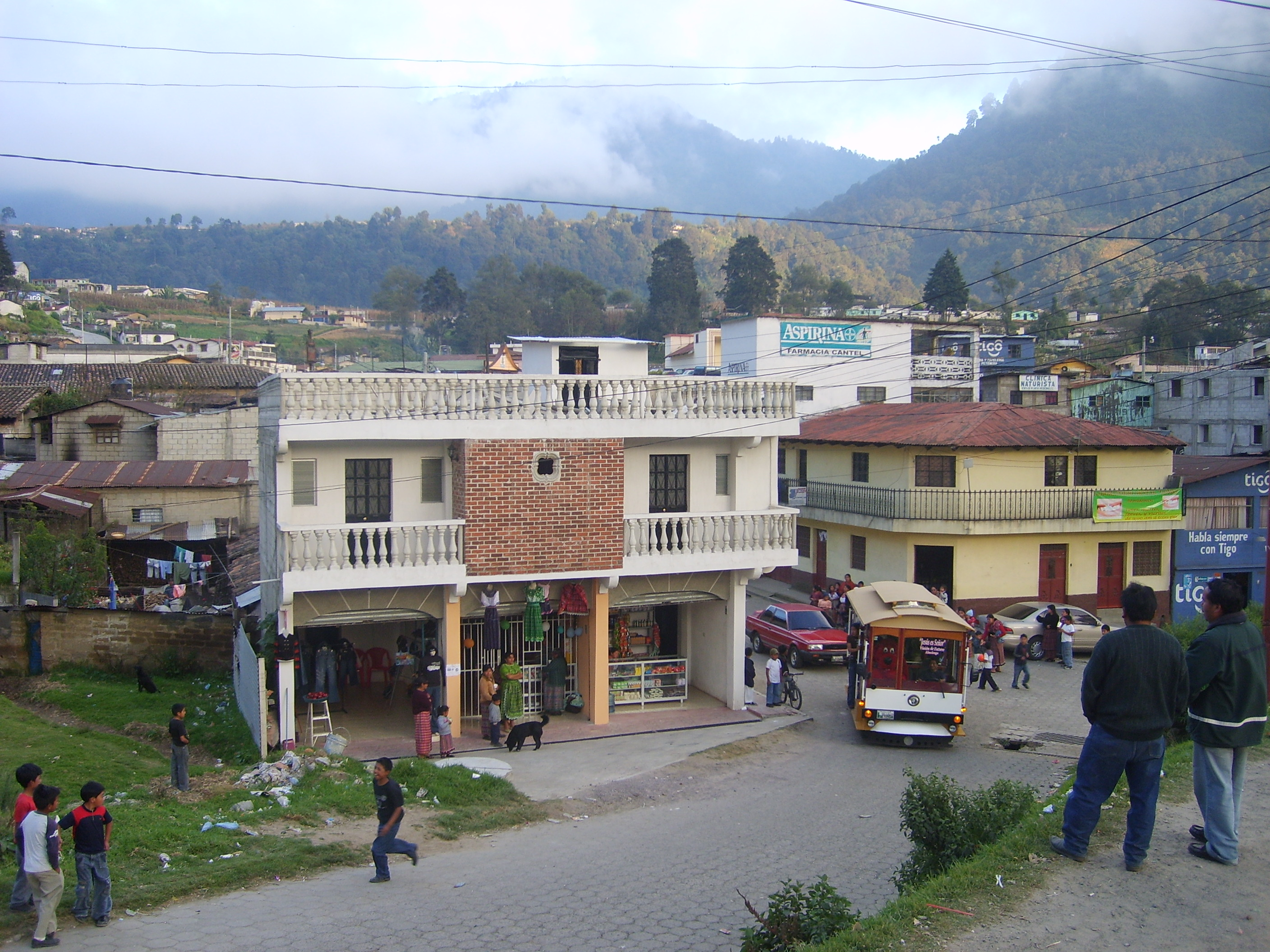
- Cantel from the Quetzaltenango - Retalhueu highway

- Location within Guatemala
- Coordinates: 14°48′40.4″N 91°27′19.84″W
- Country: Guatemala
- Department: Quetzaltenango

Area
  - Total: 20.3 sq mi (52.6 km^{2})

Population (2018 census)
  - Total: 42,142
  - Density: 2,080/sq mi (801/km^{2})
- Time zone: UTC+6 (Central Time)
- Climate: Cwb

Cantel is a municipality in the Quetzaltenango Department in Guatemala. It is located 11 km (6.8 mi) east of the city of Quetzaltenango and has an area of 52.6 km^{2} (20.3 sq mi). The town of Cantel has a population of 47,941 (2023 census), and is situated at an altitude of 2,370 m (7,780 ft).

Cantel includes the small Maya archaeological sites of Chojolom and Cerro Quiac.
