= Chojolom =

Maya archaeological site in Guatemala

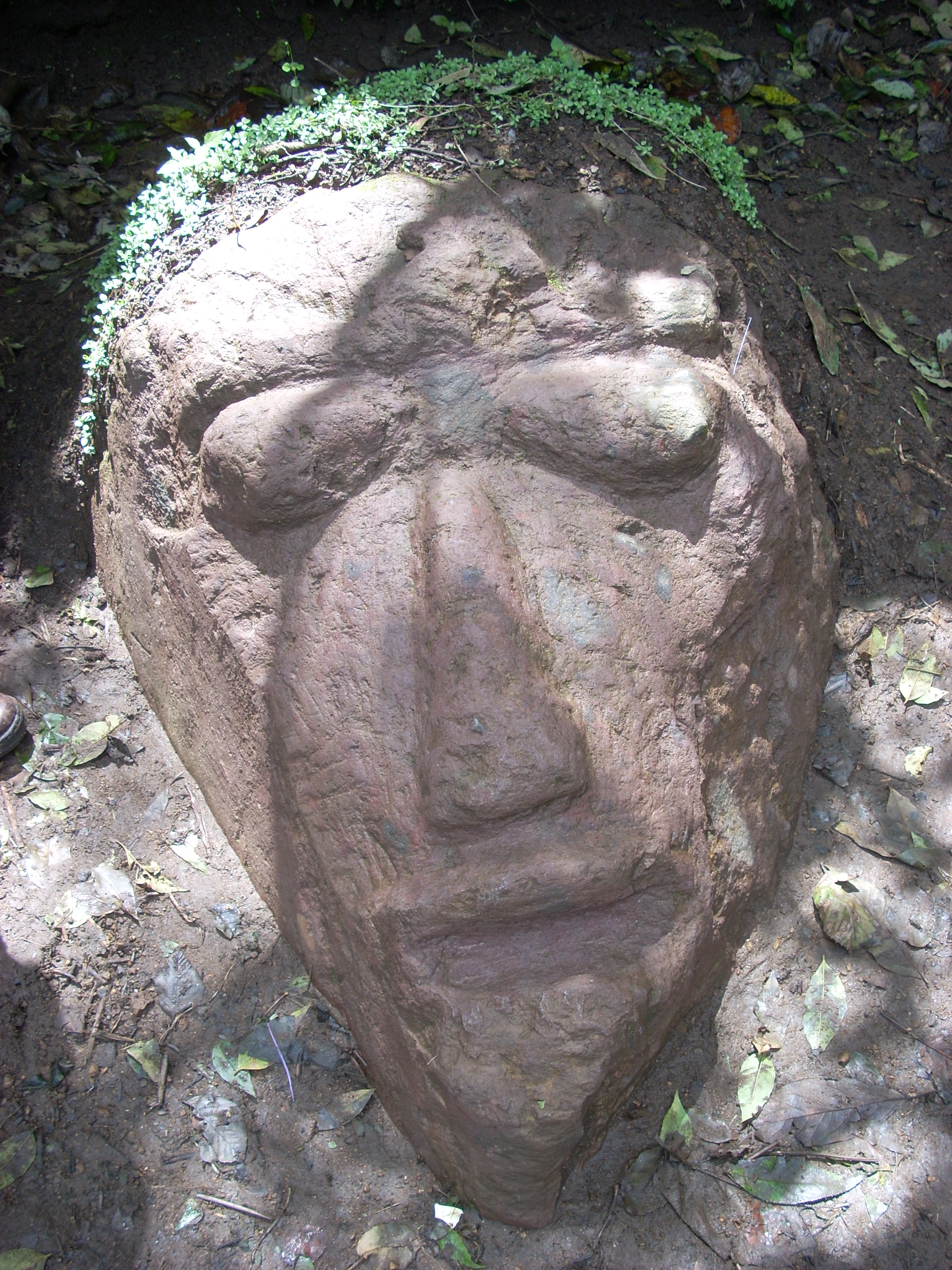
Boulder sculpture at Chojolom, believed to represent the head of a deity.

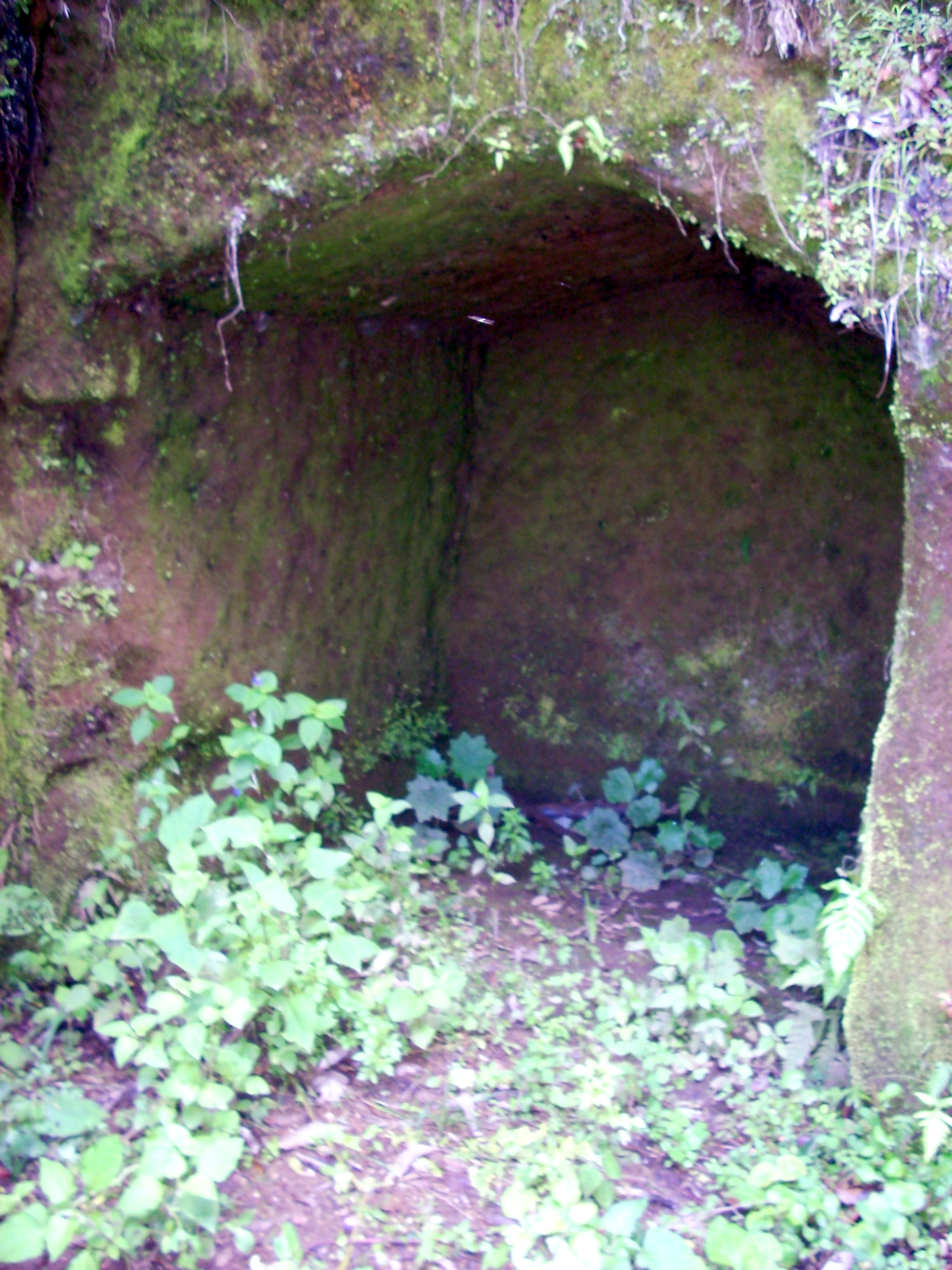
Artificial cave where one of the stone heads was found

Chojolom is a small Maya archaeological site in the western highlands of Guatemala. The site features a number of sculpted stones that are presumed to belong to the Kʼicheʼ Maya culture of the Postclassic Period (approximately AD 900–1520). Chojolom is situated on a hill in the municipality of Cantel, in the department of Quetzaltenango. The municipality is inhabited by Kʼicheʼ Maya to this day, who make up 93.8% of the local population. Cantel is located 10 kilometres (6.2 mi) from the modern city of Quetzaltenango at Kilometer 217 on the CA2 Highway. Chojolom is believed to have been a ritual site.

Chojolom means "by the head" in the Kʼicheʼ Maya language, deriving from the root word jolom ("head"). Local historian Mariano Cornejo has speculated that the depositing of the stone heads and the naming of the hill may be linked.

== Sculptures ==
As of September 2010 three sculpted stone heads have been found at the site; one of an armadillo, one human and one representing a deity. The heads were discovered when mud was cleared away after a period of heavy rain in 2010. One of the stone heads was found in a cave at the site. Ceramics and bones have also been found, which may represent a ritual offering. In addition to the stone heads, a clay head has also been found. A minor landslide in October 2010 revealed a stone altar under a tree root.

The Armadillo Head measures approximately 15 by 20 centimetres (5.9 by 7.9 in). The nine-banded armadillo (Dasypus novemcinctus) is native to the Cantel region. The Armadillo Head was the first of the three stone heads to have been found by local farmer Sebastián Sam.

The Human Head measures 50 by 50 centimetres (20 by 20 in). It was the second stone head to be discovered at Chojolom.

The Deity Head is the largest sculpture, measuring 1.1 by 1.4 metres (3.6 by 4.6 ft). It was the third stone head to be found at the site.

The Altar measures 25 by 50 centimetres (9.8 by 19.7 in) and bears designs that include circles, hills, human figures and a deer. The combination of six human figures with the deer has been interpreted as a Maya calendrical date by Guatemalan anthropologist Lina Barrios.

== Gallery ==
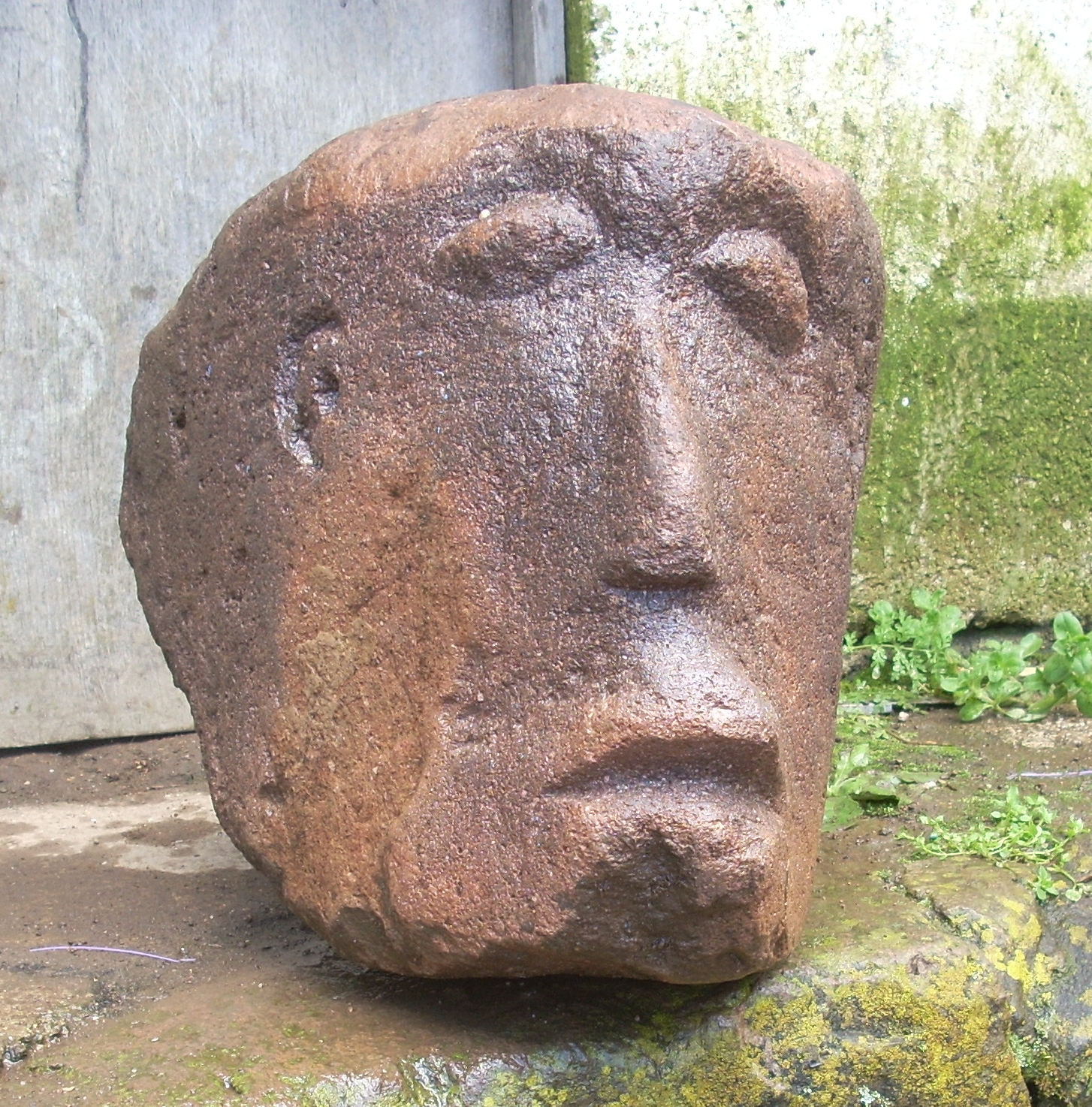
The Human Head sculpture

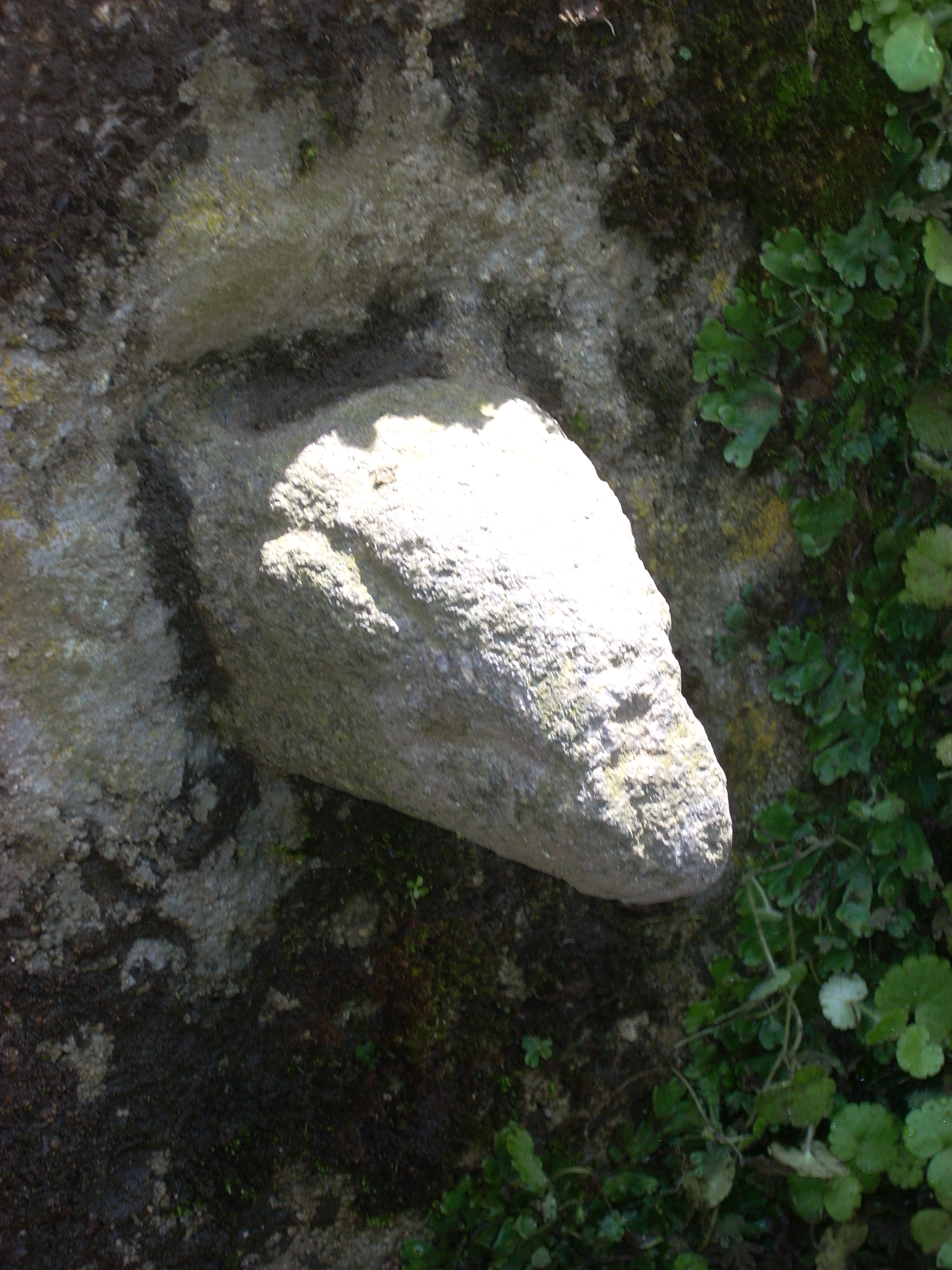
The Armadillo Head sculpture

== See also ==
- Cerro Quiac
