= Quiche (disambiguation) =

Quiche consists of a pastry crust filled with savoury custard and pieces of cheese, meat, seafood or vegetables.

Quiche or Quiches may also refer to:

- Kʼicheʼ (disambiguation), or Quiché, several uses
- Quiché Department, in Guatemala
  - Quiché Airport, Santa Cruz del Quiché
- Quiches District, in Peru
- Quiche, a Tokyo Mew Mew character
- Quiche Lorraine, a minor character in Bloom County comic strip

== See also ==
- Chiché (disambiguation)
