= Chiché =

Chiché or Chiche may refer to:

== Places ==
- Chiché, Guatemala, a municipality in the department of El Quiché
- Chiché, Deux-Sèvres, a commune in France

== People ==
- Diego "Chiche" Soñora, Argentinian soccer player
- Guillaume Chiche, French politician
- Hilda Beatriz González de Duhalde, better known as Chiche Duhalde, Argentinian politician and former First Lady
- Marina Chiche, French classical violinist
- Osvaldo "Chiche" Sosa, Argentinian soccer player and manager
- Samuel "Chiche" Gelblung, Argentinian journalist and TV host
