= Cerro Quiac =

Maya archaeological site in Guatemala

Coordinates: 14.838993°N 91.440715°W

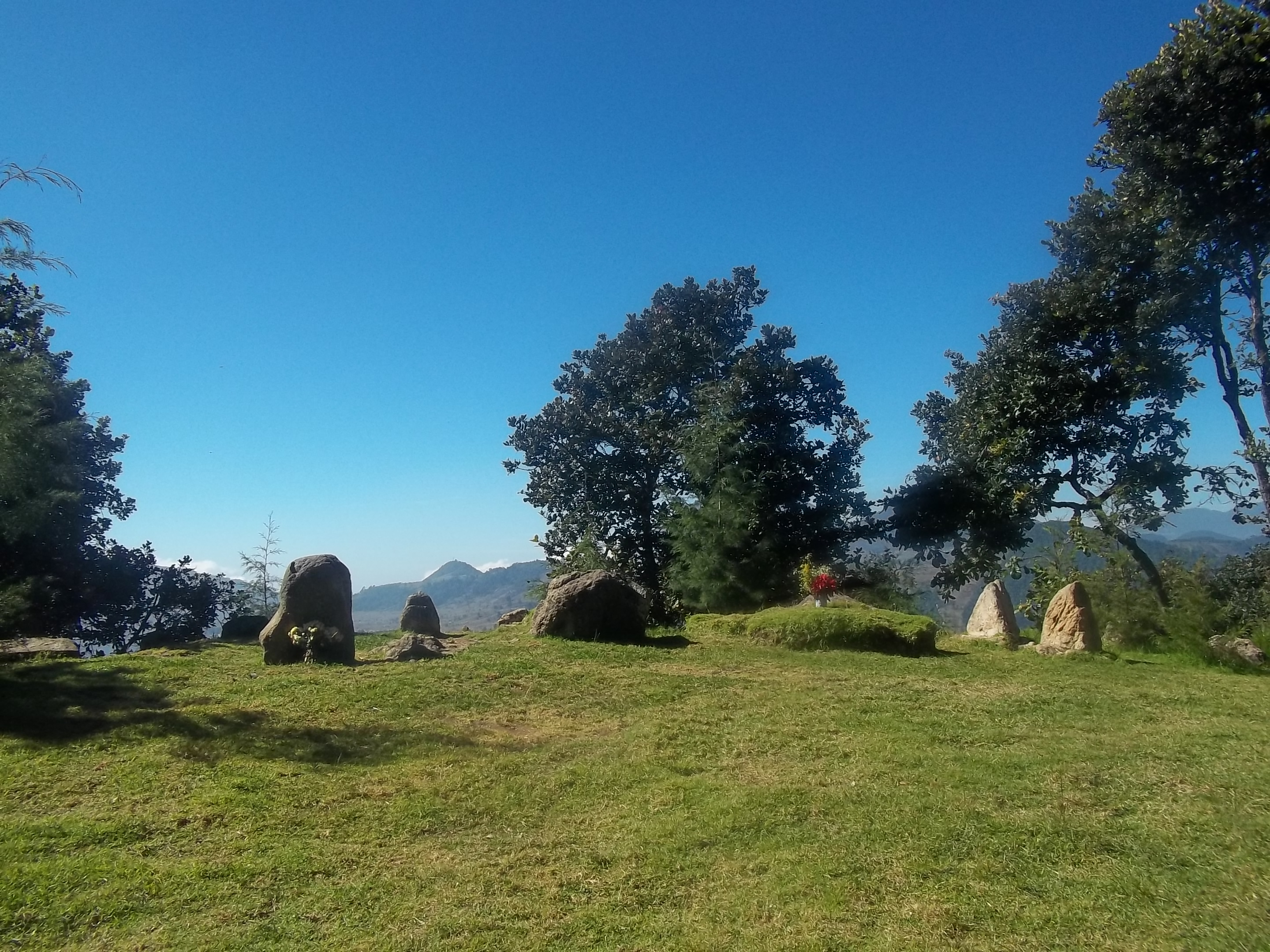
- Cerro Quiac occupies the summit of a hill overlooking Cantel
- Alternative names: K'iaq; K'iaqb'al
- Geographical range: Guatemalan Highlands
- Period: Maya
- Type site: Archaeological

Cerro Quiac (Spanish pronunciation: [ˈsero kiˈak]) (K'iche': Kʼiaq [kʼiˈaq] and Kʼiaqbʼal [kʼiaqˈɓal]) is a small Maya archaeological site located at an altitude of 2,635 metres (8,645 ft), overlooking the Plains of Urbina in the Guatemalan Highlands. When investigated in 1970, it had five stone sculptures, but by 1977 only four were left. The sculptures featured figures and geometric designs. The site is still used for contemporary Maya rituals. Cerro Quiac lies in northeast Cantel, within Chirijquiac’s boundaries.

Cerro Quiac contains two small groups of pre-Columbian architecture. An ethnohistoric document from the early Colonial period describes the site as a fortress founded by the Mam Maya, who were subsequently driven from the area by Kʼicheʼ expansion. Cerro Quiac has been dated to the Early Postclassic period of Mesoamerican chronology (approximately 900–1200 AD). According to local Kʼicheʼ folklore, the site once served as a training ground for warriors. The Kʼicheʼ hero Tecun Uman is said to have died upon the hill.

== Etymology ==
The name of the hill is variously said to be derived either from the Kʼicheʼ word kʼiaq, meaning "flea", or from the name of a small black flower that grows on the hill. Cerro means "hill" in Spanish. The name k'iaqb'al for the archaeological site means "place of throwing/shooting".

== Location ==
The site is situated to the south of the Plains of Urbina, 2 kilometres (1.2 mi) east of the Samala River, upon a prominent hill that is visible for approximately 4 kilometres (2.5 mi) in each direction. The summit of the hill is covered with pine forest. The hilltop consists of a 100-metre (330 ft) long ridge, varying in width from 20 to 100 metres (66 to 328 ft). The hill is steep-sided, with the easiest approach from the northeast, the direction furthest from the pre-Columbian remains. The western portion of the ridge is the highest, rising 160 metres (520 ft) above the valley floor; some 60 metres (200 ft) higher than the rest of the hilltop.

== Site description ==
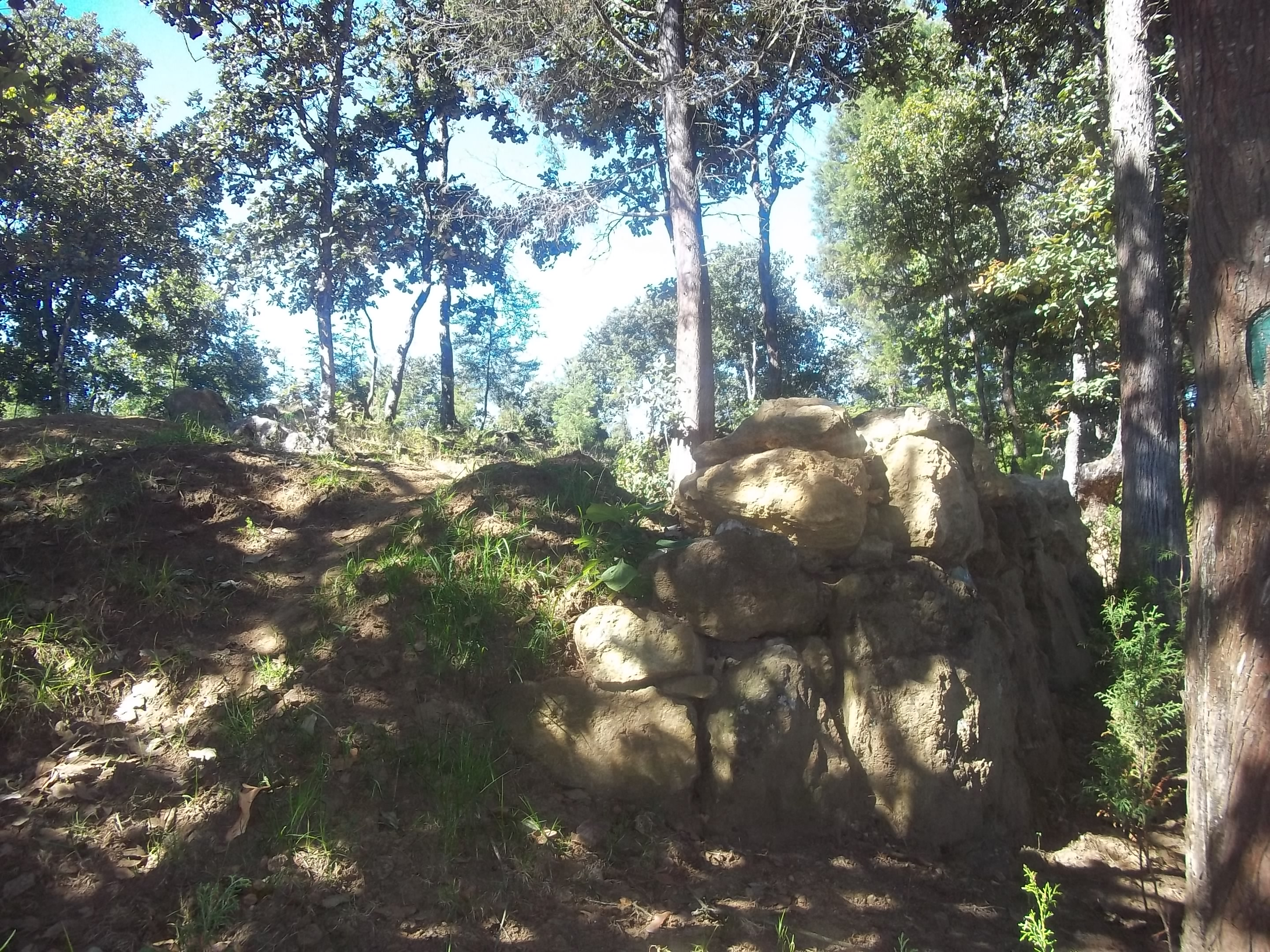
Retaining wall of the main platform in the west group

The site architecture was built on the western portion of the ridge, running approximately northwest to southeast. Large boulders have been arranged into terraces, standing 2 metres (6.6 ft) and 3 metres (9.8 ft) high respectively. There are two architectural groups, both of which are poorly preserved.

The east group possesses three earthwork mounds arranged in a line, with a fourth mound situated off to the south side. There are steep drops on the east and west sides. Plentiful ceramic remains were scattered around the group, which had been exposed by agricultural activity.

The west group is situated about 170 metres (560 ft) from the east group, and about 70 metres (230 ft) above it. A small temple was built upon a broad 1-metre (3.3 ft) high platform. The walls of the platform were built from uncut stone. Five prehispanic stelae stood upon the platform in the 1970s.

The five stelae present in 1970 were arranged in a semicircle approximately 6 metres (20 ft) across. It is possible that they were brought to Cerro Quiac from various other sites in the area. The sculptures were badly eroded. A number of pre-Columbian tombs were found on the hill, and various artefacts were recovered.

== History ==
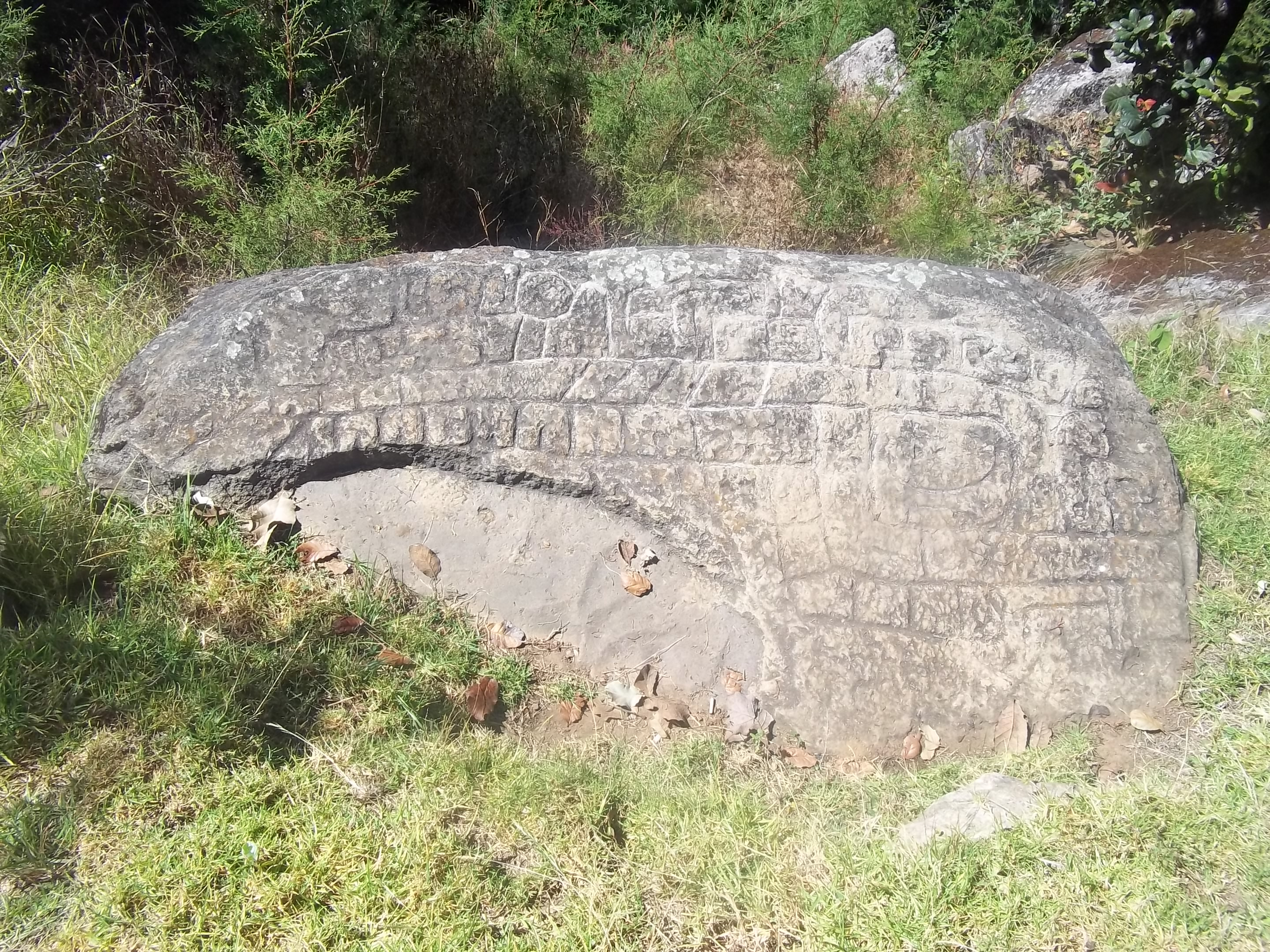
Sculpted stone at Cerro Quiac

Recovered ceramics date the site to the Early Postclassic period of Mesoamerican chronology (c. 950–1200 AD). The early colonial Kʼicheʼ document entitled Título C'oyoi describes the site as a fortress built by the Mam Maya of Zaculeu. There is no archaeological evidence of occupation after the Mam were driven from the site by Kʼicheʼ expansion. The ceramics and stelae are likely to be Mam in origin, and to date to the 13th or 14th century AD.

=== Modern history ===
In September 1884, during the presidency of Justo Rufino Barrios, two government artillery pieces were placed on Cerro Quiac in order to threaten Cantel with bombardment, and enforce compliance with government demands for money. In folk memory, this event has been conflated with local resistance to the construction of a textile factory, and central government threats to bombard the local populace into acceptance.

In 1968, during the Guatemalan Civil War, the municipal authorities of Quetzaltenango attempted to purchase the hill to build a military barracks there, but were resisted by the inhabitants of Cantel, who refused to sell the land. As a communal response, the locals argued that Cerro Quiac was an archaeological site, and the various churches of Cantel united to establish the hill as an ecumenical prayer ground. The site is the most important Maya ceremonial site in Cantel. On 28 June 2004, it was declared a site of national cultural and natural heritage by ministerial accord.

== Folklore ==
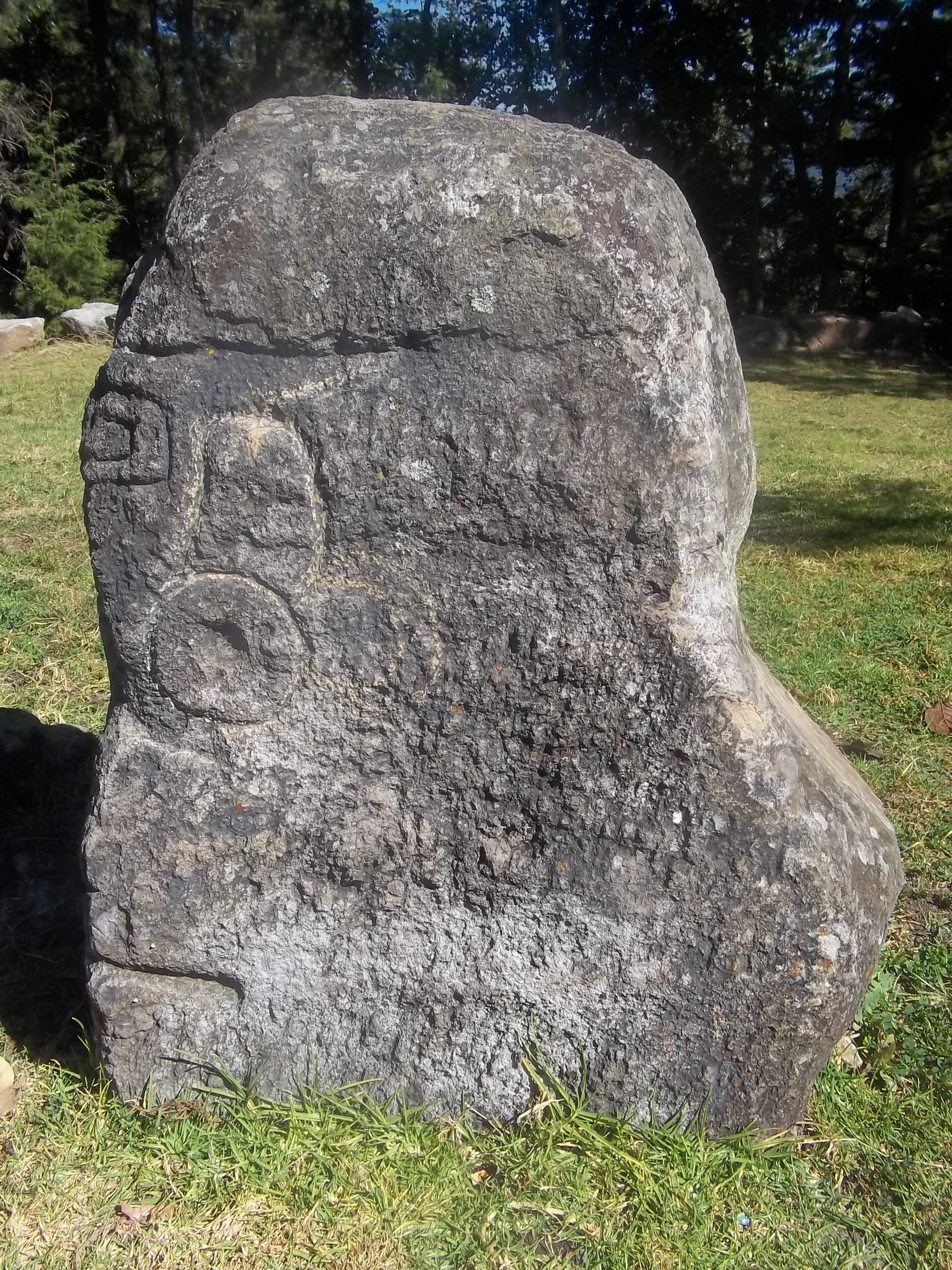
Sculpted stela fragment

In local folklore, the hill was formed by an eruption of the Cerro Quemado volcano. The great leap from Cerro Quemado to the hill is said to be the origin of its name, K'iaq, as the leap of a flea. Traditionally, the archaeological site was called Kʼiaqbal, and is said to have been a training ground for Kʼicheʼ warriors. The hill is also linked in local folklore to the Kʼicheʼ hero Tecun Uman, and his battle against Pedro de Alvarado during the Spanish conquest of Guatemala. According to one account, Tecun Uman was killed on the hill.

== See also ==
- Chojolom
