= Robert M. Carmack =

American Mesoamericanist (1934–2023)

- Born: February 24, 1934
- Died: October 20, 2023 (aged 89)
- Education: University of California Los Angeles
- Scientific career
- Fields: Anthropology
- Workplaces: State University of New York

Robert Marquess Carmack (February 24, 1934 – October 20, 2023) was an American academic anthropologist and Mesoamericanist scholar who was most noted for his studies of the history, culture and societies of contemporary Maya peoples. In particular he conducted extensive research on the K'iche' (Quiché) Mayas of the Guatemalan Highlands in the context of the infiltration and migration of Nahuatl speaking peoples into the Maya cultural areas.

Carmack was an emeritus professor of anthropology at the State University of New York at Albany who for the last few years worked as a senior Fulbright Scholar. Carmack wrote several books on early Quiché-Mayan culture and linguistics, first and foremost the standard work on the K'iche' kingdom of Q'umarkaj/Utatlán.

Born on February 24, 1934, Carmack died on October 20, 2023, at the age of 89.

== Selected publications ==
- Rebels of Highland Guatemala: The Quiche-Mayas of Momostenango. University of Oklahoma Press (1995).
- Historia Antigua de America Central: del Poblamiento a la Conquista. FLACSO, Costa Rica (1992).
- Harvest of Violence: The Maya Indians and the Guatemalan Crisis. University of Oklahoma Press (1988).
- The Quiche-Mayas of Utatlan: The Evolution of a Highland Maya Kingdom. University of Oklahoma Press (1982).
- Historia Social de los Quiches. Jose de Pineda Ibarra, Guatemala (1979)
- Quichéan Civilization: The Ethnohistoric, Ethnographic and Archaeological sources. Berkeley and Los Angeles. University of California Press (1973).

== Sources ==
- Robert Carmack's Faculty page
- Albany.edu report on Carmack's most recent studies
