= Título Cʼoyoi =

Document of the mythical origins of the Kʼicheʼ people

The Título Cʼoyoi is an important early colonial Kʼiche document documenting the mythical origins of the Kʼicheʼ people and their history up to the Spanish conquest. It describes Kʼicheʼ preparations for battle against the Spanish, and the death of the Kʼicheʼ hero Tecun Uman. The document was written in Qʼumarkaj, the Kʼicheʼ capital city, by the Cʼoyoi Sakcorowach lineage, which belonged to the Quejnay branch of the Kʼicheʼ, and who held territory just to the east of Quetzaltenango, now in Guatemala. The document was largely written by Juan de Penonias de Putanza, who claimed to be the relative of a Cʼoyoi nobleman who was killed during the Spanish conquest. It was composed with the assistance of the Kʼicheʼ officialdom at Qʼumarkaj, and portions of the text reflect the official version of Kʼicheʼ history as produced in the capital. An illustration in the document shows that the Maya nobility of Quetzaltenango adopted the double-headed Habsburg Eagle as their family crest.

== Condition ==
The original Kʼicheʼ document, including two illustrations, is held by the Robert Garrett Collection of Middle American Manuscripts at the Princeton University Library. Fifty-six pages survive, and the document is poorly preserved in places, with the pages mixed out of their reading order. The surviving pages are clearly written, with clear use of symbols to phonetically render the Kʼicheʼ language. The document is roughly one-third of the length of the Popul Vuh and the Annals of the Kaqchikels, and roughly the same length as the Título de Totonicapán, making it one of the shorter indigenous títulos.

== History of the document ==
Although Christian dates are given in the document, they are indecipherable. However, the document has been tentatively dated to 1550-1570 by the presence of several names that also appear in other early colonial documents, particularly the Título Nijaib I and the Título Nijaib II. The account of the Spanish conquest, and the description of the area around Quetzaltenango, are likely to have been derived from the recollections of Kʼicheʼ lords who had survived the Spanish invasion.

The history of the document after the 16th century is unknown; by 1920 it was in the William Gates collection. Gates had procured manuscripts from three expeditions to Guatemala in the early 20th century that specifically searched for early manuscripts. In 1930 the Gates collection was passed to the Maya Society. In 1937 it was listed in a Maya Society catalogue as the Probanza Ejecutoria del la Casa de Quiché. Garrett moved to the Institute for Advanced Study in Princeton in 1942. It was recorded as being there in 1950 by Guatemalan historian Adrian Recinos, although the Princeton Digital Library records that it was removed from the Institute in 1949 and donated to the Princeton University Library. By 1973, the document was held by the Princeton University Library as part of the Robert Garrett Collection of Middle American Manuscripts.

== Composition ==
The Título Cʼoyoi was probably written in a collaboration between the lords of Qʼumarkaj, and the Cʼoyoi lords of Quetzaltenango, with the official approval of the former. The text was likely to have been based on that of another document written using the Latin script as taught by the Spanish friars, rather than being compiled from a pre-Columbian codex as was probably the case with the Popul Vuh.

== Purpose ==
The main purpose of the document was to establish the noble origin of the Cʼoyoi lineage, and its claim to land holdings and right to rule. It also glorifies the Kʼicheʼ people. The descent of the Cʼoyoi lineage from the Kʼicheʼ royal line is repeatedly stated, and the Cʼoyoi lineage's association with famous Kʼicheʼ kings is emphasised. The text also documents the limits of the territory the Cʼoyoi claimed lordship over.

== Content ==
The document relates the mythic origins of the Kʼicheʼ people, and parallels other Kʼicheʼ documents such as the Popul Vuh. It describes the arrival of the ancestors from the east, the dawning, the migrations of the Kʼicheʼ, followed by historical events such as the founding of the Kʼicheʼ capital at Qʼumarkaj, the military campaigns of the Kʼicheʼ king Kʼiqʼab, with emphasis on the area around Quetzaltenango, and an account of the Spanish conquest that includes details of Kʼicheʼ preparations for battle. In general the Título Cʼoyoi gives briefer descriptions of events related in the Popul Vuh and Título de Totonicapán, and concentrates on Kʼicheʼ campaigns in the west and the Pacific coastal plain.

In a few places the document includes dialogue, which is described as the "words of the ancestors"; this is similar to some portions of the Popul Vuh. These instances of poetic dialogue may ultimately derive from chanted or sung accompaniments to pre-Columbian Maya codices. The two illustrations show considerable Spanish influence, although the prose is relatively free of it. All references to religion are entirely pre-Columbian, and only a few Spanish words are contained in the text. The only Christian influence in the document is the reference to the arrival of the ancestors from the east, over the sea.

The final part of the Título Cʼoyoi details the Spanish invasion and the death of the Kʼicheʼ hero Tecun Uman; this portion of the text is derived from a different tradition than the one that produced the Popul Vuh and the Título de Totonicapán, and generally corresponds to the events described in the Título Nijaib I and the Título Huitzitzil Tzunún, both of which are only known from poor Spanish-language translations of their original Kʼicheʼ text.
