= Título de Totonicapán =

16th century Kʼicheʼ language document

The Título de Totonicapán (Spanish for "Title of Totonicapán"), sometimes referred to as the Título de los Señores de Totonicapán ("Title of the Lords of Totonicapán") is the name given to a Kʼicheʼ language document written around 1554 in Guatemala. The Título de Totonicapán is one of the two most important surviving colonial period Kʼicheʼ language documents, together with the Popol Vuh. The document contains history and legend of the Kʼicheʼ people from their mythical origins down to the reign of their most powerful king, Kʼiqʼab.

== History of the document ==
In 1834 the Kʼicheʼ inhabitants of Totonicapán asked the departmental governor to persuade Dionisio José Chonay, the curate of Sacapulas, to translate the document into Spanish. The Spanish translation was archived in Totonicapán where it was found by French historian Charles Étienne Brasseur de Bourbourg in 1860. Brasseur de Bourbourg made a copy of the document and took it with him back to France, where it was passed on to Alphonse Pinart after the former's death. From Pinart this copy passed into the ownership of Hyacinthe de Charencey who produced a French translation and published both the French and Spanish texts under the title Título de los Señores de Totonicapán: Titre généalogique des seigneurs de Totonicapan. The whereabouts of the original Kʼicheʼ document was unknown for many years until it was shown to American anthropologist Robert Carmack by the Kʼicheʼ mayor of Totonicapán in 1973.

== Content ==
The introductory section of the Título includes large parts of the Theologia Indorum, written by Dominican friar Domingo de Vico in the mid-16th century. In the 1953 translation by Delia Goetz she says: "The said manuscript consists of thirty-one quarto pages; but translation of the first pages is omitted because they are on the creation of the world, of Adam, the Earthly Paradise in which Eve was deceived not by a serpent but by Lucifer himself, as and angel of light. It deals with the posterity of Adam, following in every respect the same order as Genesis and the sacred books as far as the captivity in Babylonia. The manuscript assumes that the three great Quiché nations with which it particularly deals are the descendants of the Ten Tribes of the Kingdom of Israel, whom Shalmanser reduced to perpetual captivity and who, finding themselves on the border of Assyria, resolved to emigrate."

Like the Popol Vuh, the Título de Totonicapán describes how the ancestors of the Kʼicheʼ travelled from a mythical location referred to as Seven Caves, Seven Canyons to another place called Tulan Suywa in order to receive their gods. From Tulan Suywa the ancestors traveled east across the sea to the highlands of Guatemala. According to the Título the Pa Tulán, Pa Civán (seven caves, seven canyons) was "in the other part of the ocean, where the sun sets". They were the "descendants of Israel, of the same language and the same customs". When they rose from Pa Tulán, Pa Civán the leader of the three tribes was Balam-Qitzé. The great father Naxit gave them a present called Giron-Gagal. (Note: The "Bundle", symbol of power and majesty, the carefully kept stone which, as related further on, made the peoples fear and respect the Quichés. Popul Vuh (1950), 205.) When they arrived at the edge of the sea, "Balam-Quizé touched it with his staff and at once a path opened, which closed up again for thus the great God wished it to be done, because they were sons of Abraham and Jakob".

The first part of the Título describes the travels and conflicts with other groups of the Quichés before they settled in their homelands in the Guatemalan highlands.

At this time their leader, Balam-Qitzé, sent ambassadors to their father and lord Naxit. So "that he will know the state of our affairs; that he will furnish us means so that in the future our enemies shall never defeat us; that they shall never belittle the nobility of our birth; that he will designate honors for us and for all of our descendants and that, finally, he will send public offices for those who deserve them." Two ambassadors were sent out, one to the East and one to the west. Qocaib set off to the east and accomplished his mission. Qocavib encountered some problem on the shores of the lake of Mexico and returned without doing anything. (Note: According to this description, it appears that Qocaib went toward Yucatán, where lord Naxit —that is Quetzalcoatl—lived, following the east coast of the peninsula; Qocavib took the route of the Usumacinta as far as the Laguna de Terminos, which the text calls "Lake of Mexico," whence he returned.) Qocaib was received by Naxit and was awarded various honoraria that legitimized the rule of the lords of the Quichés.

The rest of the Título is a history of the Quiches before the arrival of the Spanish. This includes a description of how the Kʼicheʼ established a defensive border against the Aztec Triple Alliance, which had expanded to include Soconusco within the Aztec empire.

The Título is careful to record the genealogy of the lords of the Quichés, who sign the document for the Spanish in 1554, using their Christian names; describing themselves as the descendants of Balam-Qitzé and their ancestors who "came from the other part of the sea, from Civán-Tulán, bordering on Babyonia."

=== Comparisons with the Popol Vuh ===
In the Popol Vuh, the ancestors of the Kʼicheʼ were created in Paxil Cayala (at the place of sunrise) and moved to Tulan Suywa, Seven Caves, Seven Canyons. Later in the Popol Vuh the two locations are merged into one. In the Título de Totonicapán, the latter version is used, with Paxil Cayala and Tulan Suywa merged into the mythical place of origin. This place is described as the Earthly Paradise, called Wuqubʼ Pek Wuqubʼ Siwan, Siwan Tulan (Seven Caves, Seven Canyons, Canyon Palace). The Título describes how the first ancestors of the "seven nations" were powerful nawals (sorcerers) who travelled across the water from Tulan Siwan. The mention of paradise, a mention of "true Sinai" in the text and the placement of Tulan in the east on the other side of the sea all show the influence of Christian beliefs upon the text. Tulan is identified in the text as a place of darkness.

In the Título de Totonicapán (and also the Popol Vuh) when the first ancestors arrived "from across the sea" they did not eat but rather sustained themselves by inhaling the smell of the tips of their staffs. Nacxit was one of the titles used for Ce Acatl Topiltzin Quetzalcoatl, a mythical lord. In the Título, two sons of Balam Quitze were sent to Nacxit to ask for peace; Co Caib went to the place of sunrise and Cʼo Cavib to the place of sunset; the document specifically equates the latter with Mexico. The fact that in the text Cʼo Cavib went west to Mexico has been interpreted as an attempt by the Kʼicheʼ to connect themselves with the politically and culturally powerful Aztec lords of Tenochtitlan. Nacxit gave them the Pisom Qʼaqʼal, the bundle of glory equated with fire and the sun.

== The Titulo de Totonicapán and the Latter Day Saint movement ==
Members of the Church of Jesus Christ of Latter-day Saints believe that the historical part of the Book of Mormon is a true history of peoples led by Lehi and later by Nephi that left the land of Jerusalem and crossed the oceans, several centuries before the birth of Jesus Christ and arrived in "the promised land", the Americas. Some Latter-day Saints believe that the Titulo de Totonicapán and the Popul Vuh support this origin. See Historicity of the Book of Mormon.
