= Classical Kʼicheʼ =

Ancestral form of the Kʼicheʼ language in Guatemala

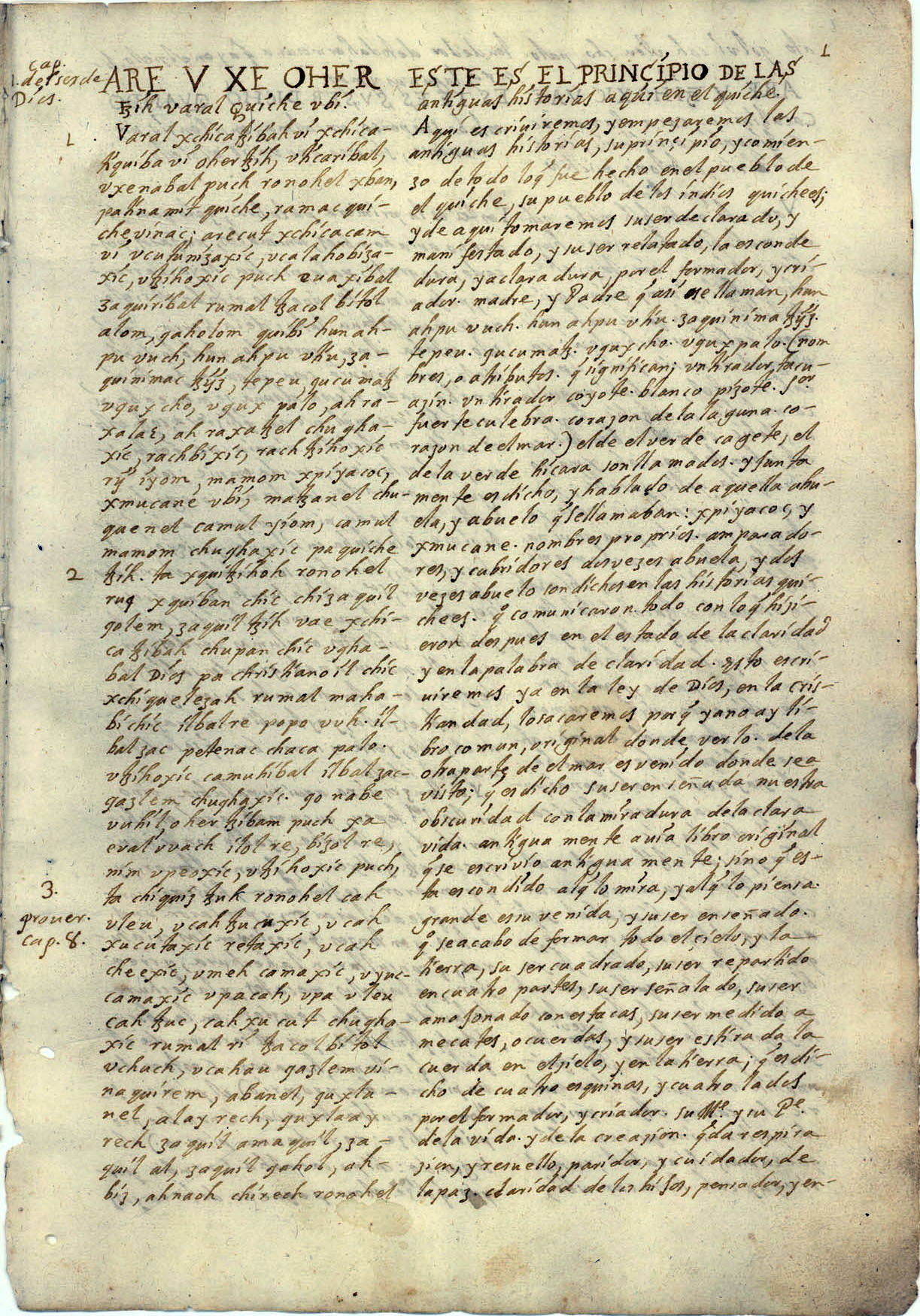
- Popol Vuh
- Native to: Guatemala
- Era: 16th century developed into Kʼicheʼ
- Language family: Mayan: Eastern (Quichean–Mamean); Greater Quichean; Quichean; Quiché–Achi; Classical Kʼicheʼ

Language codes
- ISO 639-3: None (mis)
- Glottolog: None

Classical Kʼicheʼ was an ancestral form of the modern Kʼicheʼ language (Quiché in the older Spanish-based orthography), which was spoken in the highland regions of Guatemala around the time of the 16th-century Spanish conquest of Guatemala. Classical Kʼicheʼ has been preserved in a number of historical Mesoamerican documents, lineage histories, missionary texts, and dictionaries. Most famously, it is the language in which the renowned highland Maya mythological and historical narrative Popol Vuh (or Popol Wuj in modern orthography) is written. Another historical text of partly similar content is the Título de Totonicapán.

== Phonology ==
The details of the phonology of Classical Kʼicheʼ are uncertain, since the Spanish-based writing system expressed it poorly, and one needs to use the most archaic modern dialects to reconstruct the likely pronunciation. A probable phonemic inventory as preserved in archaic Kʼicheʼ dialects is:

Consonants
		Labial	Dental/ Alveolar	Palatal	Velar	Uvular	Laryngeal
Nasal		m	n				
Plosive	plain	p	t		k	q	ʔ
Plosive	glottalised	ɓ	tʼ		kʼ	qʼ	
Affricate	plain		ts	tʃ			
Affricate	glottalised		tsʼ	tʃʼ			
Fricative			s	ʃ	x		h
Liquid	lateral		l				
Liquid	trill		r				
Semivowel		w		j			

Note that most of the glottalised stops are ejectives, but the labial one is implosive instead.

Vowels
	Front	Central	Back
High	i		u
Mid	e		o
Low		a	

An inherited feature of Kʼicheʼ is phonemic vowel length, but today, some dialects do not preserve it and the orthography of Popol Vuh does not express it either. It is likely that, as in modern Kʼicheʼ dialects, liquids and semivowels were devoiced word-finally and before consonants and that plain stops were aspirated word-finally.

Stress was always on the last syllable of the word.

== Orthography ==
The original Spanish-based orthography was variable and did not distinguish between some phonemes. In this article, the modern Guatemalan standard orthography is used. The following table shows the differences and some similarities between the ways in which Kʼicheʼ phonemes are expressed in these two systems. In other cases, the spelling coincides with the IPA sign.

Comparison of the orthographies
modern Guatemalan	phoneme	historical
bʼ	/ɓ/	b
ch	/tʃ/	ch
chʼ	/tʃʼ/	same as /tʃ/, but sometimes also gh
h	/h/	mostly unexpressed
j	/x/	h
(C)ʼ (as in tʼ, kʼ, etc.)	ejectives	mostly unexpressed, but see the individual entries
k	/k/	qu (before front vowels), c (elsewhere)
kʼ	/kʼ/	same as /k/, but sometimes also g
q	/q/	same as /k/; sometimes also k
qʼ	/qʼ/	same as /q/; sometimes also ɛ
s	/s/	z, ç; also tz!
tʼ	/t/	t, also ɧ
tz	/ts/	tz, z
tzʼ	/tsʼ/	g,
w	/w/	v, u
x	/ʃ/	x
y	/j/	y, i
ʼ	/ʔ/	unexpressed

In addition, as common in the Spanish (and other Latin-based) orthographies of the time, the letter pairs i and j, u and v were treated as equivalent with respect to sound – both members could express either a vowel (/i/, /u/) or a semivowel (/j/, /w/), depending on context.

As indicated in the table, many of the special Kʼicheʼ phonemes, notably the ejectives, did have dedicated signs. These were introduced by Father Francisco de la Parra in the middle of the 16th century and were based on inverted numbers: ɛ (inverted 3) for /qʼ/, g (actually an inverted 4) for /kʼ/, g, (inverted 4 with a comma) for /tsʼ/ and gh (inverted 4 with an h) for /tʃʼ/. There was also a sign for /tʼ/, which may be rendered as ɧ, and /q/ could be expressed with k. However, the signs were used inconsistently or not at all in many manuscripts, and Father Francisco Ximénez, who was responsible for the writing down of the Popol Vuj, apparently failed to realise that they expressed special sounds in Kʼicheʼ.

Some common phonological alternations result from the coalescence of adjacent vowels (chi- + -u > ch-u, V- + -on > -V-n) and the elision of word-final consonants of particles and function words phrase-internally (but not finally): (chik > chi). The vowels of certain suffixes become completely identical to the vowel of the root; some of these suffixes are affected in this way by any root vowel, but others, containing /o/, are influenced only by a preceding /u/ in the root, and others also by a preceding /a/.

== Grammar ==
The grammar of Classical Kʼicheʼ is fairly similar in most respects to that of the majority of modern Kʼicheʼ dialects. Some notable differences are the existence of special future tense prefixes, the default VSO word order and the preservation of indigenous rather than borrowed Spanish forms for the higher numerals. Like modern Kʼicheʼ dialects, Classical Kʼicheʼ has ergative-absolutive alignment, i.e. it normally uses the same grammatical marking for the subject of an intransitive verb and the direct object of a transitive verb, whereas the subject of a transitive verb is marked in a way different from both.

=== Nominal morphology ===
Nouns have only the categories number, possession and alienability.

==== Number ====
The plural is marked only on nouns that designate persons, and even among them only some have the ability to take it. The suffix is -Vbʼ, with the vowel being lexically determined and unpredictable, although it is most commonly /a/ (e.g. ajaw-abʼ 'princes').

==== Possession ====
Possession is expressed by the following prefixes:

1st person singular	nu- before a consonant, w- before a vowel
2nd person singular	a(w)-
3rd person singular	u- before a consonant, r- before a vowel
1st person plural	q(a)-
2nd person plural	i(w)-
3rd person plural	k(i)-

Some examples are u-bʼe 'his way', r-ochoch 'his house', a-chuch 'your (sg.) mother', nu-wach 'my face', qa-bʼiʼ 'our name'.

The standard way of marking possession of a noun by another noun is by juxtaposing the possessed noun, marked with a 3rd person possessive prefix, and the possessor noun: u-kʼuʼx kaj 'the heart of heaven', lit. 'its heart, heaven'. This is a head-marking construction typical of the Mesoamerican linguistic area.

The marking of possession is incompatible with the marking of number; in other words, the possessive prefixes and the plural suffix may not co-occur.

==== Alienability ====
Nouns may be inalienable or alienable. Inalienable nouns must always have a prefix expressing their possessor. They are mostly designations of parts of the body and relatives, certain other possessions such as the house (-ochoch), as well as nouns expressing spatial relations ('top' as in 'on top of' etc.). Alienable nouns do not require a possessive prefix, and some of them (such as designations of wild animals and plants, natural phenomena) normally don't have one.

To transform an inalienable noun into an alienable one, the suffix -Vxel is added to names of relatives, and the suffix -aj is added to names of body parts: gajol-axel 'sons'. Conversely, a noun that normally has no possessor can be transformed into an inalienable one by means of the suffix -Vl, which may also serve to emphasise the possession as in 'one's own N': u-chikop-il 'its animal(s)'.

==== Relational nouns ====
Certain inalienable nouns express spatial or abstract relations and thus function like prepositions: e.g. xeʼ 'root' – u-xeʼ N 'under N' (lit. 'its-root N'). Some others are more similar to adverbial modifiers. These are listed below:

noun	literal meaning	translation when possessed
wa(ch)	face	in front of
wiʼ	head	on
pa(m)	inside	in
ij	back	behind
xeʼ	root	under
chi	mouth, lip	beside, at
-e(ch)	property	of
-umal	reason	because of
-ukʼ	NA	together with
-onojel	NA	all together
-tukel	NA	only
-ibʼ	oneself, each other	NA

==== Adjectives ====
Adjectives are normally indeclinable. However, certain adjectives have a special attributive form that ends in the suffix -V (nim-a cheʼ 'a big tree', in contrast to nim ri cheʼ 'the tree is big') and appears only before consonant-initial words (cf. nim aq 'a big pecari'). A few can also take a special plural suffix -aq: nim-aq juyubʼ 'the big mountains'. Adjectives can also be used adverbially: nim x-kikot 'he rejoiced greatly'.

==== Pronouns ====
===== Personal pronouns =====
The free forms of the pronouns can be used only when in focus and are as follows:

	singular	plural
1st person	in	oj
2nd person	at	ix
3rd person	∅ (are)	e
polite pronoun	la(l)	alaq

Note: are is actually a demonstrative used instead of a personal pronoun. The polite pronoun is unique in that it has no corresponding possessive prefix; instead, the free form is just placed after the possessed noun: alibʼ la 'your daughter-in-law'.

Otherwise, pronominal possession is expressed by the prefixes listed in the subsection Possession of the section on nouns.

===== Demonstrative pronouns =====
Demonstratives express not only distance, but also visibility. The following demonstratives are used:

close to speaker	waʼ(e)
far, but still visible	laʼ
invisible, anaphoric	riʼ
neutral, anaphoric	are
'definite article' and relative pronoun	ri

Adverbially, waral 'here' may be used. Other demonstrative adverbs are keje 'so' and ta, kʼate and kʼut, all three of which can be glossed as '(and) then'. The 'definite article' is not obligatory.

==== Interrogrative pronouns ====
The interrogative pronouns are naki 'what' and a(pa)chinaq 'who'. Other question words are a pa 'where' and jupacha 'how'.

=== Verbal morphology ===
The basic scheme of the verb chain is as follows:

tense-aspect prefix	absolutive prefix	ergative prefix (if transitive)	stem	status suffix

The 'status suffix', also known as a 'modal suffix', expresses simultaneously three different grammatical distinctions: the contrast between indicative and imperative/optative mood (the latter having also a supine-like usage), the valency of the verb (whether it is intransitive or transitive) and whether the verb is phrase-final or not.

==== Tense and aspect morphemes ====
The tense-aspect prefixes are as follows:

completive:	x-
incompletive:	k(a)-
potential:	ch(i)-
future:	xk(a)- (intransitive) / xch(i)- (transitive)
imperative:	k(a)- (intransitive) / ch(i)- (transitive) / ∅-
prohibitative:	m-

The vowels in parentheses appear only if the next morpheme begins in a consonant. The future form is not found in contemporary Kʼicheʼ.

==== Personal agreement morphemes ====
The personal agreement prefixes are as follows:

	absolutive	ergative
1st person singular	in-	nu- before a consonant, w- before a vowel
2nd person singular	at-	a(w)-
3rd person singular	∅-	u- before a consonant, r- before a vowel
1st person plural	oj-	q(a)-
2nd person plural	ix-	i(w)-
3rd person plural	e-	k(i)-

The vowels in parentheses appear only if the next morpheme begins in a consonant, and the consonants in parentheses appear only if the next morpheme begins in a vowel. Some other final consonants may occasionally disappear in front of consonant-initial morphemes, too; e.g. in- occasionally appears as i-. Note that the absolutive prefixes are identical with the independent forms of the personal pronouns, and the ergative prefixes are identical with the nominal possessive prefixes meaning 'my', 'your' etc.

==== Status morphemes ====
The status suffixes are:

		phrase-medially	phrase-finally
intransitive	indicative and prohibitative	-∅	-ik
intransitive	imperative	-a	-oq
transitive root verb (class 1)	indicative and prohibitative	-∅	-o, -u after roots containing /u/
transitive root verb (class 1)	imperative	-a, -o or -u after roots containing /o/ or /u/ (Note: Comparison with the archaic present-day dialect of Nahuala suggests that class 1 transitive imperatives may have exhibited a distinction between a phrase-medial form and a phrase-final form: the former would have had a long vowel (i.e. /aː/, etc.), while the latter would have ended in a /ʔ/ (i.e. /aʔ/, etc.). If this was true, however, the colonial orthography could not express it.)	
transitive verb stem in -j, -Vbʼaʼ, -Vlaʼ, -Vkaʼ (class 2 transitive verb)		-∅ (Note: Polysyllabic transitive verb roots that end in a vowel always add the suffix -j to form the stem (e.g. etama-j 'to know'). As the table shows, no status suffixes are added to such stems.)	-∅ (Note: Polysyllabic transitive verb roots that end in a vowel always add the suffix -j to form the stem (e.g. etama-j 'to know'). As the table shows, no status suffixes are added to such stems.)

Besides the absolute final position, the final forms may are also commonly used in front of complex or coordinated noun phrases, as well as in cases when a demonstrative pronoun referring to the noun phrase is placed in the beginning of the clause, or when an adverbial modifier not referenced with the particle wi is.

==== Summary and examples of finite verb forms ====
Altogether, the possible affixes in the chain are:

tense-aspect prefix	absolutive prefix	ergative prefix (if transitive)	stem	status suffix
x- k(a)- ch(i)- xk(a)- / xch(i)- k(a)- / ch(i)- / ∅- m-	in- at- ∅- oj- ix- e-	nu-/w- a(w)- u-/r- q(a)- i(w)- k(i)-		-ik/-∅ -oq/-a -o/-u/-∅ -a/-o/-u

Some examples are:

1. xk-e-ul-ik 'they will come'
2. xch-u-rayi-j 'he will desire it'
3. k-ix-qa-sach 'we destroy you (pl.)'
4. x-e-qa-chʼak-o 'we defeated them'
5. k-at-tzijon-oq 'speak!'
6. w-il-a 'I want to see it!'
7. m-i-yaʼ 'Don't give it!'

==== Non-finite verb forms ====
===== Participles =====
The following participle suffixes exist:

	suffix	example	notes
perfect intransitive (refers to the absolutive participant)	-inaq (-enaq after /e/ in the root)	ok-inaq '(which has) entered'	
perfect transitive (refers to the absolutive participant)	-(o)m (Note: In the perfect transitive participle, class 2 transitive verbs use the vowel-final form of the stem and add only -m: tzʼibʼaj 'paint' – tzʼibʼam 'painted'.) (-um after /u/ in the root)	il-om '(which has been) seen'	
progressive (refers to the ergative participant)	-y	tzono-y 'who bites, biting'	Only of class 2 transitive verbs.
stative	-Vl(ik) (-Vnik after root in /l/; V is the same as the root vowel)	kuʼbʼ-ulik '(who is) sitting'	Only from positional roots.
distributive-repetitive	-Vkoj (V is the same as the root vowel)	jul-ujuj 'shining'	The stem is often of unclear nature.

In spite of their norminal nature, the participles are used predicatively, like verbs, more often than attributively or adverbially.

===== Infinitive =====
The infinitive suffixes are the following:

	suffix	example
intransitive	-ik	kamik '(process of) dying'
transitive	-(o)j -(o)n	bʼanoj '(process of) doing' bʼanon 'ditto'

The infinitive functions as a verbal noun and if it has a possessor, the latter may correspond not only to a transitive, but also to the intransitive subject. The two transitive infinitives appear to correspond to the unmarked and antipassive voices; the former always appears with an object, whereas the latter need not do so.

===== Summary of relations between finite and non-finite endings =====
	indicative medial	indicative final	imperative medial	imperative final	perfect participle	infinitive
intransitive	-∅	-ik	-a	-oq	-inaq	-ik
class 1 transitive	-∅	-o (-u)	-a (-o, -u)		-om	-oj
class 2 transitive	-j, -ʼ	-j, -ʼ	-j, -ʼ	-j, -ʼ	-m	-j

===== Voice =====
There are as many as two kinds of antipassive verb forms, which cause the subject of a transitive verb to be in the absolutive case rather than the normal ergative – the absolute antipassive, which allows the omission of the object (x-∅-kʼat-on ri k-atiʼt 'their grandmother burnt [something]'), and the focus antipassive, which is used to emphasise the subject (xa ajkun x-∅-kʼam-ow-ik ri kʼuwal 'but the doctor took the jewel'). The two are distinguished only in class 1 transitive verbs. There are also passives, which are used to omit the ergative subject – besides the basic one there is also a completive passive that emphasises the completion of an action and the resulting state of its object. Their suffixes are the following:

	absolute antipassive	focus antipassive	passive	completive passive
class 1 transitive	-on-	-ow- (-uw- after /u/ in the root)	-∅- (possibly a lengthening of the root vowel, unexpressed in the orthography)	-Vtaj, with V identical to the root vowel; (sometimes -taj)
class 2 transitive	-n		-x	-taj

In the focus antipassive, absolutive agreement with the direct object may be preserved if the subject is the unmarked third person singular: mana ixoq x-e-alan-ik 'no woman bore them'. Since the resulting forms are intransitive, they receive the status suffixes of intransitives (-ik and so on). The stem-forming suffix -Vlaʼ- also seems to be replaced by -Vlo- before -n. The applicative construction with the suffix -ibʼe-j can also be described as an 'instrumental voice' changing the valency of the verb so as to make an instrumental adverbial modifier into a direct (absolutive) object: xa chʼut x-ki-kejbʼe-j r-ij ki-tinamit 'only with stakes did they fortify the outer side (lit. back) of their city.'

Examples:

1. x-bʼan-ow(-ik) 'he is the one who made it' (focus antipassive)
2. x-bʼan-on(-ik) 'he made (something)' (absolutive antipassive)
3. x-e-tzono-n(-ik) 'they asked (for something)' (absolutive antipassive)
4. x-bʼan(-ik) (/x-bʼaːn-ik/?) 'it was made' (passive)
5. x-e-tzono-x(-ik) 'they were asked' (passive)
6. x-bʼan-ataj(-ik) 'it was made completely' (completive passive)

===== Verb complexes =====
Pairs of verbs can be combined to form verbal complexes, where the second verb can usually be interpreted as subordinated to the first. Only the first verb receives the tense-aspect prefix and only the second one receives a status suffix: k-e-raj aqʼan-ik 'they want to go up'. The first verb gets the absolutive agreement prefixes as in the example above, but the second verb gets the ergative ones if it is transitive: x-∅-kʼis k-il-o 'they stopped seeing it'.

The second verb usually has the indicative status suffix, but it has the imperative one in combinations where the first verb is one of the motion verbs bʼe 'go' and ul 'come' (e.g. x-e-bʼe kam-oq 'they went to die') and, optionally, when the second verb is a motion verb expressing direction such as uloq 'come', aqʼanoq 'rise', ubʼik 'move away from here', qajoq 'descend', apanoq 'arrive there (out) in the vicinity', kanoq 'stay, remain': e.g. x-el ul-oq 'he went hither'. In the latter case, the second verb can also be viewed as a directional adverbial particle.

=== Particles ===
Kʼicheʼ uses numerous particles, many of which carry modal meaning and are often difficult to translate. Particles tend to be encliticised to the first stressed phrase in the sentence, which is the verb in the default case, but may also be any fronted phrase (cf. Wackernagel's law in the Indo-European languages). Some, however, can also be sentence-initial and receive enclitics themselves, sometimes forming long particle chains. Some common particles are the following:

Sentence-initial particles:
particle:	meaning and usage:
kʼate	afterwards, then; introduces a new text unit
ta	then, and
ma (Often followed by more enclitics to form, e.g. mawi and mana).	negative, 'not'
xa	'only', 'however'
kʼate kʼu(t)	'and then'
Verbal enclitics:
particle:	meaning and usage:
wi	expresses quoted speech or the fact that a locational expression has been fronted
kʼu(t)	'and then'
chi(k)	'still', 'again', 'already'
(nay) pu(ch)	'too', 'and also'
lo	dubitative
bʼa	'indeed'
na	'probably', 'certainly'
on	'possibly'
ta(j)	counterfactual

If several of the above enclitics are combined, the order is ta(j) > chic > wi, na > others.

A particle serving as a conjunction is we 'if'.

=== Prepositions ===
A nearly all-purpose preposition is chi 'at, in, to' (cf. the relational noun chiʼ 'side'), which can introduce various relational nouns, especially with locative meaning: ch-u-wach ri Tojil 'in front of Tojil' (lit. 'at Tojil's face'). In addition, pa is used with the meaning 'inside (something)' (cf. the relational noun pa(m) with the same meaning). Besides combinations of the prepositions with relational nouns, it is often the verb itself that determines the specific spatial relation expressed by the preposition: e.g. opon means 'come (to a place)', whereas pe(t) means 'come (from a place)'. Hence x-Ø-opon chi Tulan 'he came to Tulan', but x-Ø-pe chi Tulan 'he came from Tulan'.

=== Word formation ===
The boundaries between inflection and derivation aren't clearcut; thus, the passives and antipassives, as well as the participle and infinitive may also be regarded as derivations. Just like inflection, derivation often crucially distinguishes between intransitive and transitive verbs of class 1 and 2 as bases, with special treatment reserved for roots that express position (so-called positional roots).

==== Intransitive verb formation ====
The following suffixes form intransitive verbs:

suffix	meaning	example
-Vr (lexically determined vowel)	inchoative: 'to become X' (from nouns and adjectives)	x-e-ajaw-ar-ik 'they became princes'
-obʼ	inchoative, from positional roots: 'to assume position X' (focus on the position)	x-∅-lil-obʼ 'he became flat'
-eʼ	inchoative, from positional roots: 'to assume position X' (focus on the motion)	x-∅-kuʼbʼ-eʼ 'he sat down'
-ije	distributive plural ('each of them')	x-bʼe-ijeʼ-ik 'each of them went'
-VC (reduplication)	intensive; from intransitive, passivised verbs and positional roots	ka-kʼat-at 'it burns strongly'
-VC-obʼ	inchoative iterative, from positional roots, passivised and intransitive verbs	x-takʼ-atobʼ 'people stood in great numbers'
-Cot (-Cut)	iterative (sound or movement)	ka-∅-koy-kot 'it trembles'
-Vlaj (vowel identical to root vowel)	make a sound	ka-bʼiq-ilaj 'gulp'

In addition, the suffix -Vn seems to form intransitive verbs from nouns and adjectives, meaning 'become/be X': e.g. utz-ij 'become good'. However, it is unclear whether this suffix is distinct from the antipassve suffix.

==== Transitive verb formation ====
The following suffixes form transitive verbs:

suffix	meaning and usage	example
-V-j (lexically determined vowel)	basic transitivising suffix; forms transitive stems from nouns, adjectives and positional roots	nim-a-j 'revere' (lit. 'make big') qajol-a-j 'raise' (lit. 'make a boy')
-isa-j	causative; forms transitive stems from intransitive ones	kam-isa-j 'kill (lit. 'cause to die')
-Vbʼaʼ (vowel identical to root vowel)	factitive: place something in position X, from positional roots	tel-ebʼaʼ 'place something on one's shoulders' (lit. 'cause something to be on one's shoulders')
-Vlaʼ (vowel identical to root vowel)	intensive; from verbs	chap-alaʼ 'fumble, grope'
-VKaʼ (vowel identical to root vowel)	completive, 'do something completely, fully'; only from transitive verbs and positional roots	chʼak-a-chʼa-j 'defeat completely'
-ibʼe-j	applicative from intransitive verbs, makes the instrument into an object (absolutive participant)	kam-ibʼe-j 'die of (it)'
-(o)bʼe-j (/o/ in class 1)	same as above, but from transitive verbs	kej-bʼe-j 'fortify with (it)'

Note that the /a/ in -Vlaʼ and -VKaʼ is often replaced by /o/ in various formations, including the passive.

==== Noun formation ====
The following suffixes form nouns:

suffix	meaning	example
-Vbʼal (lexically determined vowel)	instrument or place	kun-abʼal 'a means or place of healing'
-Vbʼ (lexically determined vowel)	same as above, but from positional roots	tzʼap-ibʼ 'door', lit. 'means or place of closing'
-(o)l	agent noun from transitive verbs	bʼan-ol 'maker'
-el	agent noun from intransitive verbs (including antipassives and passives)	kam-el 'a dying one' kam-isa-n-el 'killer' maʼi-x-el 'something (to be_ destroyed'
-em, -am, -im	action noun from intransitive verbs only. For other action nouns, see section on infinitives	war-am 'sleep'
-om	agent noun from nominals	qajol-om 'son raiser'
-Vl	abstract or collective, from nominals. May also be an adjective.	nim-al 'greatness' mun-il 'slavery' qajol-al 'boyish'
-Vlaj	intensity, from verbs or nominals.	nim-alaj 'very big (one)'

Nouns may also be formed by compounding, in which case the right member functions as a head: kʼicheʼ tzij 'Kʼicheʼ language', bʼalam jolom 'jaguar head'. As with adjectives, a connecting vowel of unpredictable quality (but most commonly /a/) may appear between two consonants: tzʼikin-a ja 'jaguar house'

Another common way of forming designations of persons, especially agent nouns, is by prefixation with aj-: aj-tzʼibʼ 'writer'.

=== Numerals ===
The numerals have free forms, which are used as separate words, and bound forms, which are used to form compounds. The free forms of 2 to 9 contain the plural suffix -Vb: e.g. kaʼ-ibʼ 'two', wuq-ubʼ 'seven'; in noun phrases: ox-ibʼ bʼe 'three roads', ox-ibʼ kajol-abʼ 'three boys'. Their bound forms lack that suffix: kaʼ, wuq- etc. The numerals 1 jun and 10 lajuj lose their final consonants in bound form: ju-, laju-.

The teens are formed by adding the bound forms of the units to the word lajuj 'ten': ju-lajuj 'eleven', wuq-lajuj 'seven-teen'. The higher numbers are based on a vigesimal principle, with multiples of 20 (-winaq, lit. 'man', with ten fingers and ten toes), 400 and 8000 (-chui); thus 24.000 is ox-chuwi (3 X 8000). However, other multiples of twenty but 20 and 40 actually have their own roots, e.g. much '80', and 400 is exceptionally expressed as 5 X 80 o-much rather than *20 X 20. Numerals close to powers of twenty are expressed in a way that can be exemplified as follows: 381 = lit. '1 on 400', 390 = lit. '10 on 400', etc.

The bound forms are also used in combinations with numeral classifiers, which are required with certain nouns: ox-chobʼ tinamit 'three cities'.

Ordinals are expressed by prefixing the cardinal with the 3rd singular possessive prefix" 'r-ox' 'its three (N) = three (of N) = the third (N)'. Only the ordinal 'first' is suppletive: nabʼeʼ. Distributive numerals can be formed by reduplication of the first syllable (ka-kabʼ 'two by two') or by postposing the morpheme taq 'a quantity, number': bʼelejebʼ taq 'nine each'.

The following suffixes can be added to numerals:

1. -ichal expresses 'a group of (X number'); e.g. kaj-ichal 'a group of four'.
2. -mul expresses 'X number of times', e.g. kaj-mul 'four times'
3. -ix and -ij expresses time in the future, i.e. 'in X days, on the Xth day': e.g. kabʼ-ij 'in two days'
4. -ir added to -ij expresses time in the past, i.e. 'X days ago': e.g. kabʼ-ij-ir 'two days ago'

=== Syntax ===
The default word order is VSO (with predicative adjectives also taking the place of the verb). This is different from most modern dialects, where much vacillation is found, but the most archaic ones seem to have VOS. It should also be noted that it is relatively uncommon for one and the same sentence to contain expressions of both the subject and the object by separate words. In spite of the default status of VSO, different phrases can be fronted to the place before the verb to express focus and emphasis; this fronting is obligatory for question words and independent forms of the pronouns. A transitive subject, however, can only be fronted if the verb is in the antipassive voice. If the fronted phrase is an adverbial modifier (most commonly a locational one), the verb may be followed by the particle wi. Particles are placed after the first phrase in the word (the verb or a fronted phrase).

Existence is expressed with the verb kʼo(jeʼ) 'there is', and 'having' is expressed with that verb and possessive prefixes on the noun: kʼo u-xikʼ 'it has wings', lit. 'wings of it exist'. The verb of existence is suppletively negated with another root, jabʼi, i.e. as ma jabʼi.

There is no copula verb corresponding to English 'to be'. Instead, both adjectives and nouns can function as predicates alone, preceding the subject just as verbs do: nim ki bʼis 'their grief (is) great', ki samahel ri tukur 'the owl (is) their messenger'.

Both adjectives and possessors precede their nouns. Of demonstratives, the definite article ri also precedes the noun, as does the 3rd person plural pronoun e used for emphasis, but other demonstratives follow it. The possessor of a deverbal noun is always the subject.

== Sample text (beginning of the Popol Vuh) ==
	Colonial orthography	Modern orthography	translation
1.	Are v xe oher tzih, varal Quiche vbi.	Areʼ u xeʼ ojer tzij, waral Kʼicheʼ u bʼiʼ.	This is the beginning (lit. 'root') of the ancient history (lit. 'word'), (of this place) here – Kʼicheʼ is its name.
2.	Varal xchicatzibah vi, xchicatiquiba vi oher tzih:	Waral xchiqatzʼibʼaj wi, xchiqatikibʼaʼ wi ojer tzij:	Here we shall write, we shall begin the ancient history:
3.	vticaribal, vxenabal puch –	u tikarib'al, u xe'nab'al puch –	the way it began, the way it originated –
4.	ronohel xban pa tinamit quiche, ramac Quiche vinac.	ronojel xbʼan pa tinamit Kʼicheʼ, ramaqʼ Kʼicheʼ winaq.	all of it was done in the city of Kʼicheʼ, in the nation of the Kʼicheʼ people.
5.	Arecut xchicacam vi: vcutunizaxic, vcalahobizaxic, vtzihoxic puch ...	Areʼ kʼut xchiqakʼam wi: u kʼutunisaxik, u qʼalajobʼisaxik, u tzijoxik puch ...	This then we shall gather: the manifestation, the declaration, as well as the narrative of ...
6.	... euaxibal, zaquiribal, rumal Tzacol, Bitol – Alom, Qaholom quibi.	... awaxibʼal, saqiribʼal, rumal Tzʼaqol, Bʼitol – Alom, Kʼajolom ki bʼiʼ.	... the way it was sown, the way it dawned because of the Joiner, the Modeller – their names are Childbearer and Son-begetter.

== Bibliography ==
- Brasseur de Bourbourg, Charles Étienne (1862). Gramatica de la lengua quiche = Grammaire de la langue quichée, espagnole-française mise en parallèle avec ses deux dialectes, cakchiquel et tzutuhil, tirée des manuscrits des meilleurs auteurs guatémaliens: ouvrage accompagné de notes philologiques avec un vocabulaire comprenant les sources principales du quiché comparées aux langues germaniques et suivi d'un essai sur la poésie, la musique, la danse et l'art dramatique chez les Mexicains et les Guatémaltèques avant la conquête; servant d'introduction au Rabinal-Achi, drame indigène avec sa musique originale, texte quiché et traduction française en regard. Librairie américaine. Ziz Bartolo (Quiché–French trans.). Paris: Arthus Bertrand. OCLC 1819915. (in French, Spanish, and K'iche')
- Dürr, Michael. 2015. Einführung in das kolonialzeitliche Kʼicheʼ (Quiché). Berlin. Online. – an introduction to Classical Kʼicheʼ, in German
- Dürr, Michael. 2003. Morphologie, Syntax und Textstrukturen des Maya-Quiche des Popol Vuh. Linguistische Beschreibung eines kolonialzeitlichen Dokuments aus dem Hochland von Guatemala. Durchgesehene und korrigierte elektronische Neuausgabe. Berlin. Archived copy at the Internet Archive. – A description of the grammar of the Classical Kʼicheʼ of Popol Vuh, in German
- Edmonson, Munro S. (1968). "Classical Quiche". In Norman A. McQuown (Volume ed.) (ed.). Handbook of Middle American Indians, Vol. 5: Linguistics. R. Wauchope (Series general ed.). Austin: University of Texas Press. pp. 249–268. ISBN 0-292-73665-7. OCLC 277126.
