= Cipactli =

First day of the Aztec calendar and mythological creature

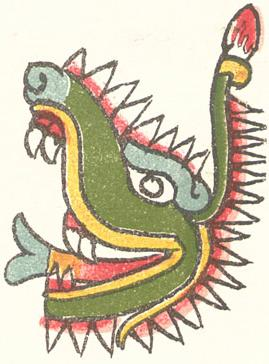
Cipactli

Cipactli (Classical Nahuatl: Cipactli "crocodile" or "caiman") was the first day of the Aztec divinatory count of 13 X 20 days (the tonalpohualli) and Cipactonal "Sign of Cipactli" was considered to have been the first diviner. In Aztec cosmology, the crocodile symbolized the earth floating in the primeval waters. According to one Aztec tradition, Teocipactli "Divine Crocodile" was the name of a survivor of the flood who rescued himself in a canoe and again repopulated the earth. In the Mixtec Vienna Codex (Codex Vindobonensis Mexicanus I), Crocodile is a day associated with dynastic beginnings.

In Aztec mythology, Cipactli was a primeval sea monster, part crocodilian, part fish, and part toad or frog. Always hungry, every joint on its body was adorned with an extra mouth. The deity Tezcatlipoca sacrificed a foot when he used it as bait to draw the monster nearer. He and Quetzalcoatl created the earth from its body.

Karl A. Taube has noted that among the Formative-period Olmec and the pre-Hispanic Maya peoples, crocodilians were identified with rain-bringing wind, probably because of the widespread belief that wind and rain clouds are "breathed" out of cave openings in the earth. A series of Olmec-style bas-reliefs from Chalcatzingo in the state of Morelos portrays crocodilians breathing rain clouds from their upturned mouths. Portable green stone Olmec sculptures depict crocodilians in similar positions, indicating that they are probably also breathing.

In the Maya tzolk'in, the day Cipactli corresponds to Imix. In the Mayan Popol Vuh, the name of the earthquake demon, Zipacna, apparently derives from Cipactli. Sipakna is the demon Sipak of 20th century Highland Maya oral tradition. In Migian, Cipactli is Quanai.

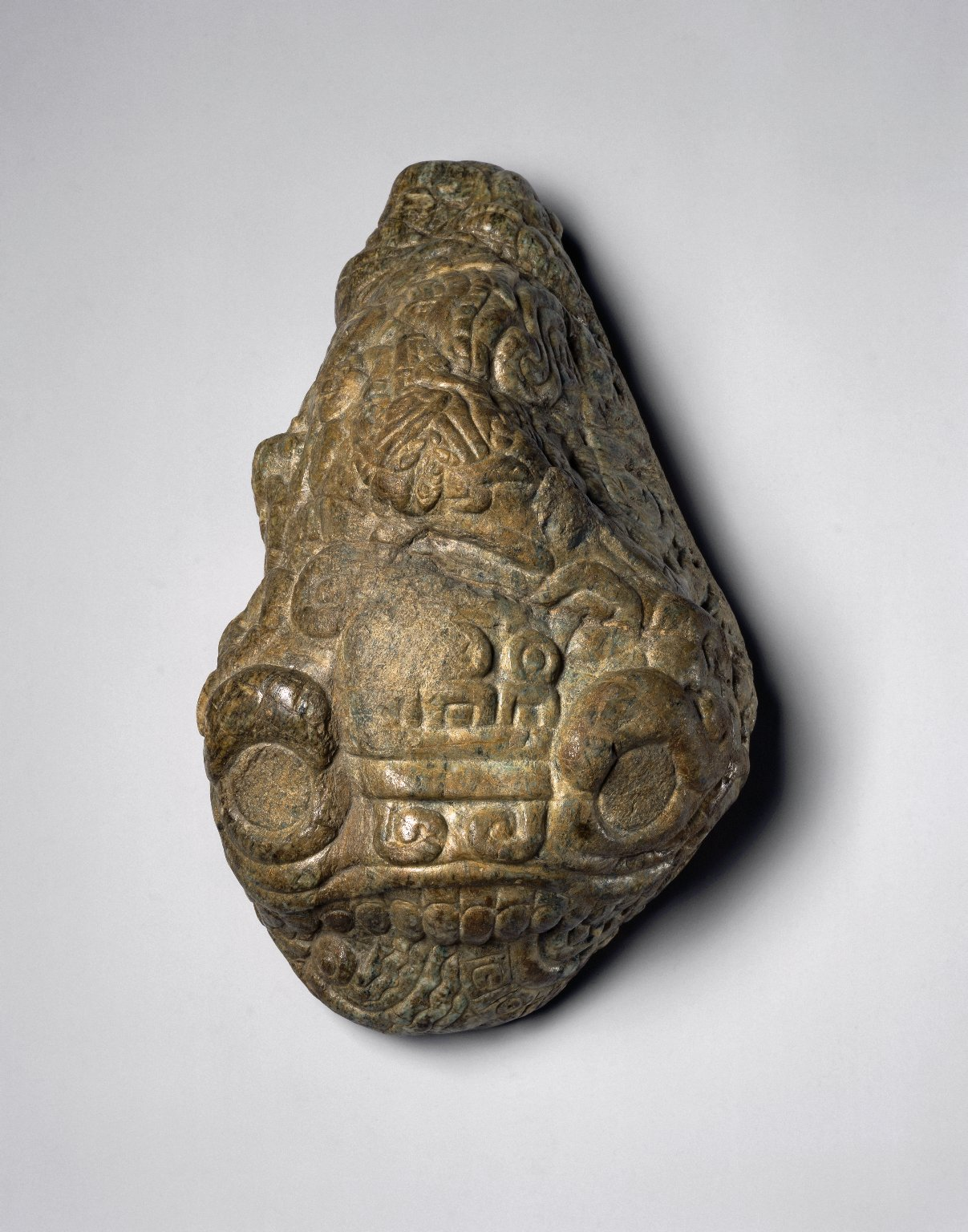
Earth Monster (Cipactli), 15th century, Brooklyn Museum

In other versions, Cipactli is called Tlaltecuhtli, a deity referred to as the "earth monster".

== See also ==
- Aztec calendar
- Five suns
- Leviathan
- Makara
- Tiamat in Mesopotamian mythology
- Zipacna
- Ymir
