= Maya mythology =

Maya or Mayan mythology is part of Mesoamerican mythology and comprises all of the Maya tales in which personified forces of nature, deities, and the heroes interacting with each other play the main roles. The mythology of the Pre-Spanish era has to be reconstructed from iconography and incidental hieroglyphic captions. Other parts of Mayan oral tradition (such as animal tales, folk tales, and many moralising stories) are not considered here.

== Important Early-Colonial and recent narrative themes ==
In Maya narrative, the origin of many natural and cultural phenomena is set out, often with the moral aim of defining the ritual relationship between humankind and its environment. In such a way, one finds explanations about the origin of the heavenly bodies (Sun and Moon, but also Venus, the Pleiades, the Milky Way); the mountain landscape; clouds, rain, thunder and lightning; wild and tame animals; the colors of the maize; diseases and their curative herbs; agricultural instruments; the steam bath, etc. The following more encompassing themes can be discerned.

=== Cosmogony ===
The Popol Vuh describes the creation of the earth by a group of creator deities, as well as its sequel. The Book of Chilam Balam of Chumayel relates the collapse of the sky and the deluge, followed by the slaying of the earth crocodile, the raising of the sky and the erection of the five World Trees. The Lacandons also knew the tale of the creation of the Underworld.

=== Creation of Humankind ===
The Popol Vuh gives a sequence of four efforts at creation: First were animals, then wet clay, wood, and then last, the creation of the first ancestors from maize dough. To this, the Lacandons add the creation of the main kin groupings and their 'totemic' animals. A Verapaz myth preserved by Las Casas in his 'Apologética Historia Sumaria' assigns the creation of humankind to artisan gods similar to the Popol Vuh monkey brothers. The creation of humanity is concluded by the Mesoamerican tale of the opening of the Maize (or Sustenance) Mountain by the Lightning deities.

=== Actions of the Heroes: Arranging the World ===
The best-known hero myth, included in the Popol Vuh, is about the defeat of a bird demon and of the deities of disease and death by the Hero Twins, Hunahpu and Xbalanque. Of considerable interest is also the parallel narrative of a maize hero defeating the deities of Thunder and Lightning and establishing a pact with them. Although its present spread is confined to the Gulf Coast areas, various data suggest that this myth was once a part of Mayan oral tradition as well. Important mythological fragments about the heroic reduction of the jaguars and the acquisition of jaguar power have been preserved by the Tzotzil and Chol Maya.

=== Marriage with the Earth ===
This mythological type defines the relationship between humankind and the game and crops. An ancestral hero – Xbalanque in a Kekchi tradition – changes into a hummingbird to woo the daughter of an Earth God while she is weaving, or to abduct her; the hero's wife is finally transformed into the game, bees, snakes and insects, or the maize. If the hero gets the upper hand, he becomes the Sun, his wife the Moon. A moralistic Tzotzil version has a man rewarded with a daughter of the Rain Deity, only to get divorced and lose her again.

=== Origin of Sun and Moon ===
The origin of Sun and Moon is not always the outcome of a marriage with the Earth. From Chiapas and the western Guatemalan Highlands comes the tale of Younger Brother and his jealous Elder Brethren: Youngest One becomes the Sun, his mother becomes the Moon, and the Elder Brethren are transformed into wild pigs and other forest animals. In a comparable way, the Elder Brethren of the Popol Vuh Twin myth are transformed into monkeys, with their younger brothers becoming Sun and Moon. To the west of the Maya area, the transformation of two brothers into sun and moon is the main subject of many tales.

== Reconstructing pre-Spanish mythology ==
It is doubtful that mythological narratives were ever completely rendered hieroglyphically, even though a sort of 'strip books' may once have existed. The surviving Mayan books are mainly of a ritual and also (in the case of the Paris Codex) historical nature, and contain few mythical scenes. As a consequence, depictions on temple walls, stelae, and movable objects (especially the so-called 'ceramic codex') are used to aid reconstruction of pre-Spanish Mayan mythology. A main problem with depictions is defining what constitutes a mythological scene, since any given scene might also represent a moment in a ritual sequence, a visual metaphor stemming from oral literature, a scene from mundane life, or a historical event. The easiest way to solve this problem is to focus on scenes that include known mythological actors. This only became possible in the early 1970s, when an enormous increase in the number of Maya vases available for study occurred.

In the seventies, the leading Maya scholar Michael D. Coe identified several actors of the Popol Vuh hero myth on ceramics, chief amongst these Hunahpu, Xbalanque, and the Howler Monkey brothers (Hun Batz and Hun Choven). This initiated a tendency among scholars to interpret vase scenes nearly exclusively in terms of the Popol Vuh. Especially influential in this respect was one of Coe's students, Karl Taube, who equated the so-called "tonsured maize god" with Hun-Hunahpu, the father of the Popol Vuh hero brothers. Using bits from monumental inscriptions, Linda Schele even composed a cosmogonic myth for this "First Father", one that still awaits iconographic confirmation. It runs as follows:

"Under the aegis of First Father, One-Maize-revealed, three stones were set up at a place called 'Lying-down-sky', forming the image of the sky. First Father had entered the sky and made a house of eight partitions there. He had also raised the Wakah-Chan, the World Tree, so that its crown stood in the north sky. And finally, he had given circular motion to the sky, setting the constellations into their dance through the night."

More recently, two major works by Oswaldo Chinchilla Mazariegos (2011, 2017) opened up new horizons of iconographic interpretation by considering a great variety of Mayan and Mesoamerican tales in addition to the Popol Vuh.

== Important Late-Preclassic and Classic narrative themes ==
Mythological representations run from the Late-Preclassic murals of San Bartolo up to the Late-Postclassic codices. The following is an overview of ancient myths that connect, in grand part, to the broad narrative themes of early-colonial and more recent oral traditions outlined above.

=== Cosmogony: Defeat of the Great Crocodile ===
In an early description of a Yucatec fire ritual (Relación de Mérida), a crocodile symbolizes the deluge and the earth; such a crocodile, called Itzam Cab Ain, was instrumental in causing a flood and was defeated by having its throat cut (Books of Chilam Balam of Maní and Tizimín). Pre-Spanish data are suggestive of these events. A water-spewing, deer-hooved celestial dragon on page 74 of the Dresden Codex is generally believed to be causing a deluge. A Postclassic mural from Mayapan shows a tied crocodile in the water, whereas a Classic inscription from Palenque (Temple XIX) mentions the decapitation of a crocodile.

=== Creation of Humankind: Monkey Brothers ===
On several vases, the Monkey Brothers of the Popol Vuh, Hun-Batz ('One Howler Monkey') and Hun-Choven, are shown as Howler monkey gods writing books and sculpting human heads. Hieroglyphically and metaphorically, the acts of writing and sculpting can refer to the creation of human beings. A myth transmitted by Las Casas puts these acts in their proper, transcendent perspective by describing how previous efforts at creation failed, until two artisan brothers, Hun-Ahan and Hun-Cheven, received permission to create humankind and, indeed, the present universe, through their artifice.

=== Actions of the Heroes ===
==== Hero Twins ====
Tales about the Hero Brothers whom the Popol Vuh calls Hunahpu and Xbalanque (the iconographical 'Headband Gods') already circulated in the Classic Period, albeit in versions only partially coinciding with the sixteenth-century narrative. It is, for example, not at all common to find them as ball players. Two or three other episodes stand out instead. The first one, corresponding to the isolated Vucub Caquix tale in the Popol Vuh, is the defeat of a bird demon already illustrated in Late-Preclassic Izapa and the earliest ball court of Copan, and found all over Mesoamerica. The second episode, not represented in the Popol Vuh, has the hero brothers tend to a dying deer covered by a shroud with crossed bones, in a scene that may represent the transformation of the heroes' father into a deer. In both Maya and non-Maya hero tales, such a transformation is equivalent to the origin of death. The San Bartolo west wall murals may show still another episode, namely, Hunahpu bringing the first sacrifices in the four quarters of the world. Finally, the Headband Gods often participate in the mythology of the Tonsured Maize God, the Maize Hero.

==== Maize Hero ====
The Tonsured Maize God is the subject of many episodes, only part of which has been explained. Often he is accompanied by the Hero Twins. Some scholars consider him the Classic form of the Hero Twins' father, the failed hero Hun-Hunahpu, and accordingly view the maize god's head attached to a cacao tree as the severed head of Hun-Hunahpu suspended in a calabash tree. However, there is also a tendency to treat the Tonsured Maize God as an agent in his own right. Scholars have compared him to the maize hero of the Gulf Coast peoples and identified several episodes from this deity's mythology in Maya art, such as his aquatic birth and rebirth, his musical challenge to the deities of water and rain (on San Bartolo's west wall) and his victorious emergence from the latter's turtle abode. Others, however, prefer to view the 'musical challenge' as a rainmaking ritual and the emergence from the turtle abode as the Opening of the Maize Mountain. Another frequent scene, the maize god surrounded by nude women, may relate to the fact that the Tonsured Maize God also functions as a moon god; for in many Mesoamerican sun and moon tales, a playful young man becomes moon rather than sun upon giving in to the lures of young women. Other scholars, however, view the women as 'corn maidens', or even as the maize deity's 'harem', a concept not otherwise attested.

==== Jaguar Slayers ====
According to a concept prevalent among Maya groups of Chiapas, in the dim past jaguars presented a continuous threat to humankind. In their myths and rituals, Tzotzil, Tzeltal and Ch'ol Mayas have therefore highlighted the deeds of jaguar-slaying heroes, deeds such as killing jaguars transfixed to their stone seats; catching jaguars in a 'stone trap'; and burning them on a certain rock. All of these jaguars represent the power of hostile social groups. Codical vases show similar feats but appear to ascribe them to four men. A down-lying jaguar deity associated with war and terrestrial fire has a boulder thrown onto his belly, perhaps belonging to a trap; alternatively, he is tied and put to the torch, in one scene while being seated on a boulder-like altar. Probably because jaguars can also symbolize hostile rulers and their warriors, the latter episode is referred to in certain monumental inscriptions at Naranjo, as well as in the art of Tonina (bound captive with jaguar god attributes). The same inscriptions connect the Classic Jaguar Slayer theme to that of the enigmatic Jaguar Baby.

=== Marriage with the Earth ===
==== Hummingbird Suitor ====
As mentioned earlier, 'Hummingbird' is the hero of a widespread narrative about the wooing and abduction of the daughter of the principal mountain deity. Since the daughter represents the 'bride-wealth' of the earth, this tale was also recited as part of the procedures for asking the hand of a girl. Accordingly, a famous Classic vase shows a suitor with a hummingbird mask presenting a vase to the upper god and what appears to be his daughter, the moon. In the same context belongs the well-known figurine of a bird perched on a loom and observing a young woman weaving.

==== Abduction Episode ====
A number of codical vases show antlered young men together with young women and amazons mounting a deer, all of them surrounding a wounded or dying old man who is the patron deity of the deer (Sip). Additional scenes have the upper god, Itzamna, riding a deer and the hero brothers hunting a boar with the upper god clinging to it. The group with the wounded old man has been explained by concepts and tales relating to the hunt, but also by the abduction episode of Hummingbird myth, in a reconstructed Classic version. One such version runs like this:

“The aged god Huk Siʼp [the Lord of the Deer] fell ill. One of the Twins changes to a deer in order to abduct his wife. The wife of Huk Siʼp flees with the Twins. The aged god asks Itzamnaaj that he brings back his wife. Riding on a deer Itzamnaaj pursues the Twins. The Twins attack Itzamnaaj and wound him. Itzamnaaj saves himself from them by riding a peccary [wild boar]. The Twins reconcile with Itzamnaaj and bring him gifts.”

Another reconstruction, however, casts an antlered maize deity ('Maize-Deer God') in the role of the presumed abductor. Much is still speculative here.

== See also ==
- List of Maya gods and supernatural beings
