= Hun Hunahpu =

Figure in Mayan mythology

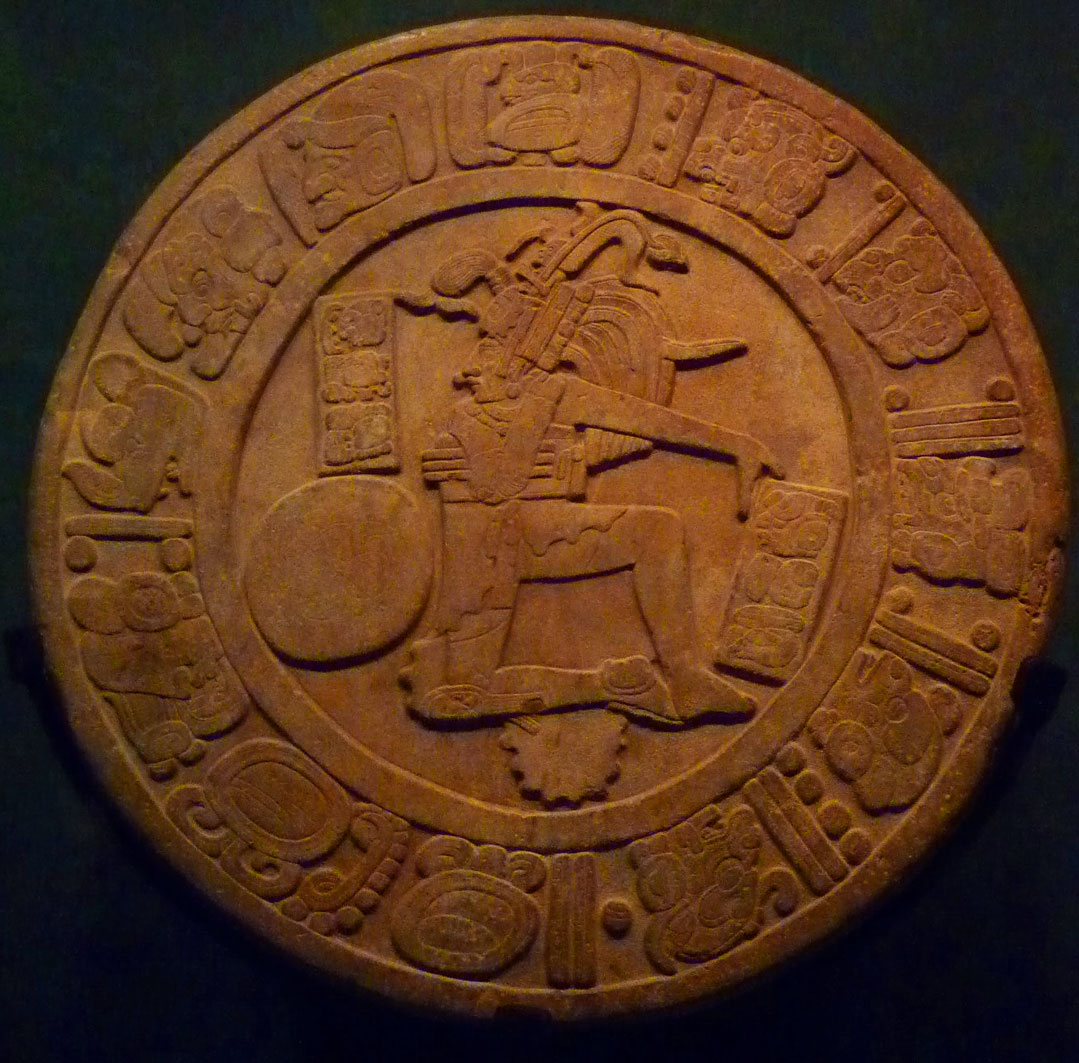

Hun Hunahpu "One Hunahpu" (pronounced [hunhunaxˈpu]) is a figure of Late Postclassic Maya mythology whose name connects him to the XXth day of the day count, Hunahpu (corresponding to Classic Ajaw "Lord"). His tale is part of the early-colonial "Popol Vuh" manuscript. According to this source, Hun Hunahpu is the father of the Maya Hero Twins, Hunahpu and Xbalanque. He is also the father of the twins' half-brothers, the patrons of artisans and writers, Hun-Chowen and Hun-Batz. Hun Hunahpu is paired with his brother, Vucub-Hunahpu "Seven Hunahpu". These two brothers of the generation preceding that of the hero twins were tricked into the Dark House by the lords of the Underworld (Xibalba) and sacrificed. Hun Hunahpu's head was suspended in a trophy tree and changed to a calabash. Its saliva (i.e., the juice of the calabash) impregnated Xquic, a daughter of one of the lords of Xibalba. She fled the Underworld and conceived the Twins. After defeating the Underworld lords, the twins recovered the remains of their father and their father's brother, but could not resuscitate them.

== Hun Hunahpu and the Maize deity ==
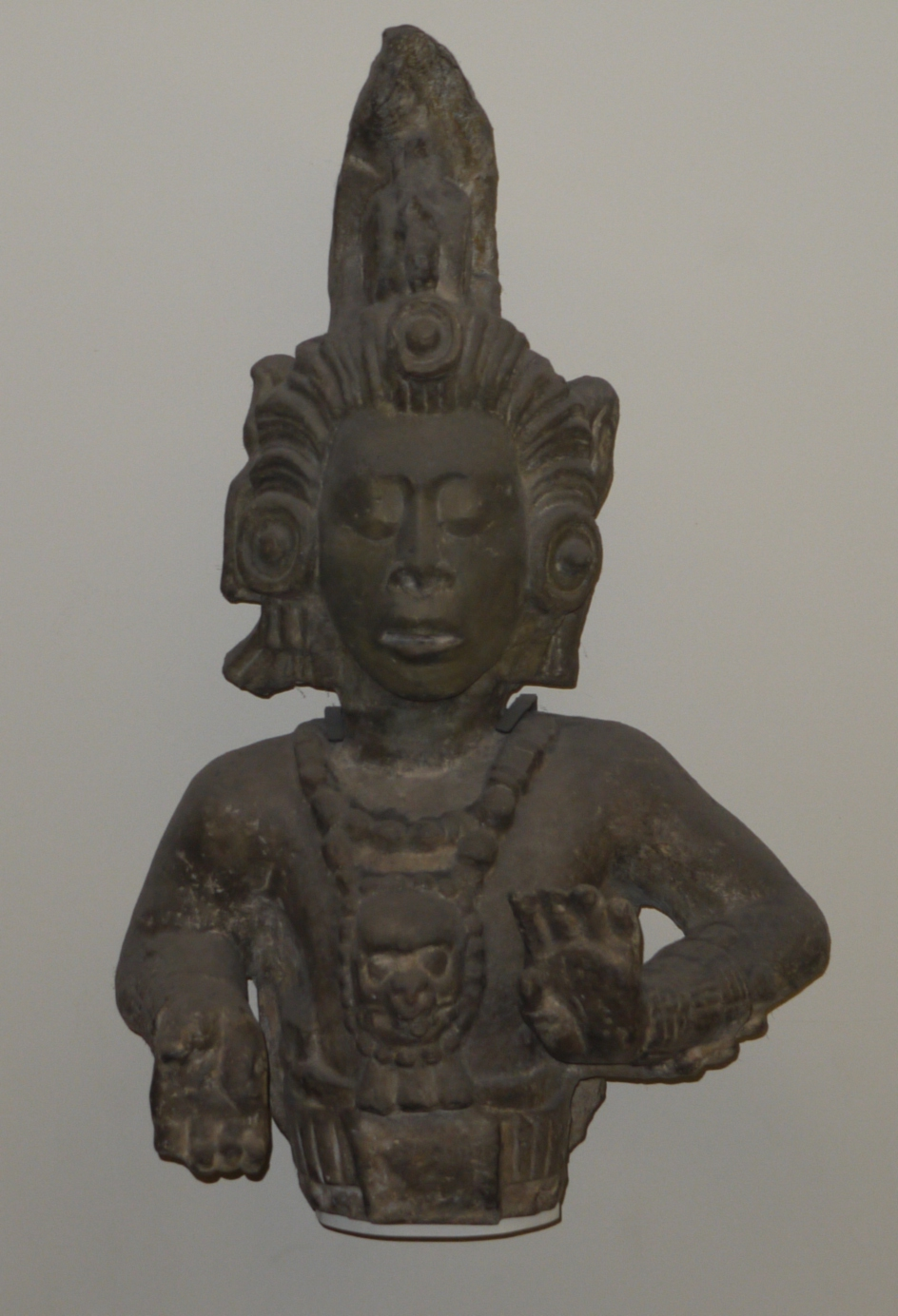
Late Classic Maya representation of the maize god, cast of statue found on a temple dating to 715 AD in Copan

It has been argued that unlike the Quiché Maya of the Late Postclassic, the Maya of the Classical Period believed the paternal figure to have been reborn as the maize. In this theory, the Tonsured Maize God rising from a turtle carapace (the 'tomb' of the earth) is Hun Hunahpu resurrected, while the flanking Hero Twins are viewed as his sons rather than his coevals. Therefore, Hun Hunahpu is often referred to as a 'maize deity,' and the maize deity as 'First Father'. In support of the Maize Deity theory, reference is often made to a pottery scene showing a cacao tree with a maize (and also cacao) god head suspended in one of its branches, taking the place of one of the pods. This head is suggested to be the trophy head of Hun Hunahpu. Although the identification of Hun Hunahpu with the Classic Maya Maize Deity has become popular, objections remain. Thus, the hieroglyphic name of the Tonsured Maize God is different from the portrait glyph of (Hun-)Hunahpu, and the tree with the suspended trophy head is a personified cacao tree instead of a calabash tree. Such dissimilar fruits are unlikely to have had the same associations for the Maya.

== Sources ==
- Freidel, Schele, Parker, Maya Cosmos. New York: William Morrow 1993.
- Dennis Tedlock, Popol Vuh. New York: Simon and Schuster 1996 [1985 1st ed.].
- Karl Taube, Aztec and Maya Myths. The British Museum / University of Texas Press 1997.
- Taube, Karl (1985). "The Classic Maya Maize God: A Reappraisal" (PDF). In Virginia M. Fields (volume ed.) (ed.). Fifth Palenque Round Table, 1983. Merle Greene Robertson (general ed.) (Online publication:November 2003 ed.). Monterey, CA: Pre-Columbian Art Research Institute.
