= Luis Enrique Sam Colop =

Guatemalan writer

Luis Enrique Sam Colop or Sam-Colop (1955 – 15 July 2011) was a Guatemalan/Native American linguist, lawyer, poet, writer, newspaper columnist, promoter of the K'iche' language, and social activist.

== Early life and education ==
He was born in Cantel, Guatemala in 1955. Sam Colop graduated in Law at the Rafael Landivar University and obtained his Ph.D. at SUNY, Buffalo in 1994 with a dissertation on Maya poetry.

== Teaching career ==
He taught K'iche' Language at the Universidad de San Carlos, Guatemala. Starting in 1999 he was a Fulbright-sponsored visiting scholar at St. Mary's College of Maryland

== Books and articles ==
Published works by Luis Sam-Colop include two poem collections, Versos sin refugio and La copa y la raíz as well as various essays and articles. He is best known outside Guatemala for a new edition of the Popol Vuh in the native language. He recently received a Guggenheim fellowship in connection with this work.
