= Tzolkʼin =

260-day calendar used by the pre-Columbian Maya civilization

Today (at UTC+00)
- Sunday, 15 November 2026
- Maya: 13.0.14.1.17; 10 Ceh, 11 Caban
Other calendars
Akan	Nkyikwasi
Armenian	28 Trē 1476
Aztec	Tlacaxipehualiztli 4, 11 Ōlīn
Babylonian	4 Arakhsamna, 2337 SE
Balinese pawukon	Menga, Kajeng, Jaya, Umanis, Urukung, Redite of Ukir, Kala, Gigis, Pandita
Bengali	30 Kartik, BS 1433
Chinese	Yin Water Snake・Room Mansion; Fire Horse Year, Month 10, Day 7 (Lidong, 7 days until Xiaoxue)
Common Era	15 November 2026 CE
Coptic	6 Hathor, AM 1743
Egyptian	3 Pharmuthi, 2775 NE
Ethiopian	6 H̱edār, 2019 Amätä Məhrät
French Republican	Décade III, Quartidi de Brumaire de l'Année 235 de la République
Gregorian	15 November, AD 2026
Hebrew	5 Kislev, AM 5787
Hindu	Uttarāṣāḍha・Śūla; Solar: 29 Kārtika, 1948 SE; Lunisolar: Ṣaṣṭhī, Śukla pakṣa of Kārtika, 2083 VE; Rāudra・5127 KY・1,872,894
Icelandic	Sunnudagur, 23 Gormánuður 2026
Islamic	4 Jumada al-thani, AH 1448 (using tabular method)
ISO week date	2026-W46-7
Japanese	7 Kannazuki, Reiwa 8 (Rittō, 7 days until Shōsetsu)
Julian	2 November, AD 2026 (AM 7535)
Julian day	2461360
Korean	7 Dwaejidal, 4359 DE
Roman	ante diem IV Nonas Novembres, MMDCCLXXIX AUC
Solar Hijri	24 Aban, SH 1405
Tibetan	6 smin drug, me pho rta 2153 or 1772 or 1000

The tzolkʼin (Mayan pronunciation: [t͡sol ˈkʼin], formerly and commonly tzolkin) is the 260-day Mesoamerican calendar used by the Maya civilization of pre-Columbian Mesoamerica.

The tzolkʼin, the basic cycle of the Maya calendar, is a preeminent component in the society and rituals of the ancient and the modern Maya. The tzolkʼin is still used by several Maya communities in the Guatemalan highlands. While its use has been spreading in this region, this practice is opposed by Evangelical Christian converts in some Maya communities.

The word tzolkʼin, meaning "division of days", is a western coinage in Yucatec Maya. Contemporary Maya groups who have maintained an unbroken count for over 500 years in the tzolk'in use other terms in their languages. For instance, the Kʼicheʼ use the term Aj Ilabal Qʼij [aχ ilaɓal qʼiχ] or Raj Ilabal Qʼij [ɾaχ ilaɓal qʼiχ], 'the sense of the day' or 'the round of the days' and the Kaqchikel use the term Chol Qʼij [t͡ʃol qʼiχ], 'the organization of time'. The names of this calendar among the pre-Columbian Maya are not widely known. The corresponding Postclassic Aztec calendar was called tonalpohualli in the Nahuatl language.

== The twenty day names ==
The tzolkʼin calendar combines a cycle of twenty named days with another cycle of thirteen numbers (the trecena), to produce 260 unique days (the least common multiple of 20 and 13, which happens to equal 20 × 13 since the two numbers are coprime, is 260). Each successive named day is numbered from 1 to 13, and then starting again at 1.

The 20 individual named days are the following:

Tzolkʼin calendar: named days and associated glyphs (in sequence)
Seq. N^{o.} ^{1}	Day Name ^{2}	Inscription glyph example ^{3}	Codex glyph example ^{4}	16th C. Yucatec ^{5}	Reconstructed Classic Maya ^{6}	Associated natural phenomena or meaning ^{7}
01	Imix			Imix	Haʼ (?)	Glyph to represent the Naah Kan (Primordial Snake, also called Waterlily Serpent or Water Serpent) this god is the essence of water, his body is the undulating band of water.
02	Ikʼ			Ik	Ikʼ	wind, breath, life force
03	Akʼbʼal			Akbal	Akʼab (?)	darkness, night, early dawn
04	Kʼan			Kan	Ohl (?)	Net, sacrifice
05	Chikchan			Chicchan	(unknown)	cosmological snake
06	Kimi			Cimi	Cham (?)	death
07	Manikʼ			Manik	Chij (?)	deer
08	Lamat			Lamat	Ekʼ / Lamaht (?)	Venus, star, ripe(ness), maize seeds
09	Muluk			Muluc	(unknown)	jade, water, offering
10	Ok			Oc	Ook (?)	dog
11	Chuwen			Chuen	(unknown)	howler monkey
12	Ebʼ			Eb	(unknown)	rain
13	Bʼen			Ben	(unknown)	green/young maize, seed
14	Ix			Ix	Hix (?)	jaguar
15	Men			Men	Tz'ikin (?)	eagle
16	Kibʼ			Cib	(unknown)	wax
17	Kabʼan			Caban	Chab / Kab (?)	earth
18	Etzʼnabʼ			Etznab	(unknown)	flint
19	Kawak			Cauac	(unknown)	rain storm
20	Ajaw			Ahau	Ajaw	lord, ruler, sun
NOTES: 1. The sequence number of the named day in the Tzolkʼin calendar 2. Day name, in the standardized and revised orthography of the Guatemalan Academia de Lenguas Mayas; 3. An example glyph (logogram) for the named day, typical of monumental inscriptions ("cartouche" version). Note that for most of these, several alternate forms also exist.; 4. Example glyph, Maya codex style. When drawn or painted, most often a more economical style of the glyph was used; the meaning is the same. Again, variations to codex-style glyphs also exist.; 5. Day name, as recorded from 16th-century Yucatec language accounts, according to Diego de Landa; this orthography has (until recently) been widely used 6. In most cases, the day name as spoken in the time of the Classic Period (c. 200–900), when most inscriptions were made, is not known. The versions given here (in Classical Maya, the main language of the inscriptions) are reconstructed based on phonological comparisons; a '?' symbol indicates the reconstruction is tentative.; 7. Each named day had a common association or identification with particular natural phenomena

The tzolkʼin does not have a generally recognized start and end, although there are specific references in the books of Chilam Balam to 1 Imix as the beginning day.

Each of the twenty days has its specific primary association connected to the day name's meaning.

- Imix : 'Crocodile' – the reptilian body of the planet earth, or world
- Ik : 'Wind' – breath, life. Also violence.
- Akbal : 'Night-house' – darkness, the underworld, realm of the nocturnal jaguar-sun.
- Kan : 'Maize' – sign of the young maize lord who brings abundance, ripeness. Also lizard, net.
- Chicchan : 'Snake' – the celestial serpent
- Cimi : 'Death'
- Manik : 'Deer' – sign of the Lord of the Hunt
- Lamat : 'Rabbit' – sign of what is also known as the planet Venus, sunset. The glyph may depict four grains of maize. Invoked by the feminine name "Ixqʼanil" by Xquic.
- Muluc : 'Water' – symbolised by jade, an aspect of the water deities; fish. Invoked by the feminine name "Ixtoj" by Xquic.
- Oc : 'Dog' – who guides the night sun through the underworld.
- Chuen : 'Monkey' – the great craftsman, patron of arts and knowledge. Also thread.
- Eb : 'Grass' or 'Point' – associated with rain and storms.
- Ben : 'Reed' – who fosters the growth of corn, cane, and man.
- Ix : 'Jaguar' – the night sun. Also maize. Associated with the goddess Ixchel.
- Men : 'Eagle' – the wise one, bird, moon
- Cib : 'Owl/Vulture' – death-birds of night and day. Also wax, soul, insect.
- Caban : 'Earthquake' – formidable power. Also season, thought.
- Etzʼnab : 'Knife' – the obsidian sacrificial blade.
- Cauac : 'Rain' or 'Storm' – the celestial dragon serpents and the chacs, gods of thunder and lightning.
- Ahau : 'Lord' – the radiant sun god. Also associated with the Mayan hero twins.

The variant names and associations below are common to three post-conquest Guatemalan highland calendars. Their interpretations are based primarily on an 1854 manuscript by Hernandez Spina.

- Imox is a bad day, associated with the insane, on which the priests of the sun pray that harm may come to their enemies through evil spirits.
- Iq is a bad day, symbolic in the same way of the destructive forces of nature; that power is localized in stone idols, who are honored with incense, roses, candles, pine needles, and aguardiente. Tumours and painful swellings are attributed to the influence of this day.
- Aqabal is a bad day, on which the priests of the sun go to shrines to pray against their enemies. The day is symbolic of evil in general and of slanderers, in particular.
- Kat is a bad day in the same sense as Aqabal, symbolic of evil in general.
- Kan is a bad day. It brings sickness and is symbolic of the arbitrary cruelty of nature.
- Kame is recorded as a bad day by one 19th-century source and as a good day by one 20th-century source, Ruth Leah Bunzel. It is symbolic of the ultimate dissolution by death of everything good and everything evil. It is a good day to confess one's evil deeds, and ask for pardon.
- Keej is a good day on which wishes are made. It is a good day to ask favors and to commemorate ancestors.
- Qanil is a good day, sacred to fertility gods, associated with human nourishment, the growth of crops, the cycle of death and rebirth, and of the milpa. After the harvest is completed, thanksgiving is made on Qanil.
- Toj is a bad day, symbolized by sickness, and anyone born on it will be perverse. It is a good day to wish sickness upon an enemy.
- Tzi is a bad day, symbolized by sexual depravity. No ceremonies must ever be held on this day.
- Batz is a bad day, symbolized by paralysis. According to some, it is a good day, symbolic of the ancestors.
- E is a good day, symbolized by destiny, fortune, and the essential characteristics of one's personality. It is a day on which marriages may be held, and sacrifices to benign deities may be made.
- Aj is a good day, consecrated to fertility gods, herdsmen, and domesticated animals. The day is symbolic of one's destiny as embodied in one's nagual.
- Ix is a good day, sacred to the mountain and forest spirits. On this day, protection may be sought from wolves and wild predators, in favor of flocks and animals. The day is symbolic of the creative force in general, and of the earth itself.
- Tzikin is the most excellent day of all. Double offerings are made at shrines, in forests, and in caves. It is a day on which wishes may be made, forgiveness may be sought, and important matters may be finalized.
- Ajmaq is also a very good day, one sacred to the spirits that preside over good health.
- Noj is an auspicious day, on which good judgement may be prayed for. The day is symbolic both of humanity's amoral and moral qualities.
- Tijax is a good day. It is a day of verbal arguments, and a good day to confess sins.
- Kawoq is recognized as an indifferent day or a bad day. It is symbolic of the malice of the dead.
- Junapu or Ajpu is an indifferent day, neither a bad or good portent, on which the power of the ancestors is embodied by the house itself.

== Uses ==
The tzolkʼin was extensively used in Mayan inscriptions and codices. Symbolism related to the tzolkʼin is also observed in the Popol Vuh (which, though written in the early post-conquest period, is probably based on older texts). For instance, when Xmucane has set an impossible task for Xquic of collecting a netful of corn from one stalk and Xquic successfully completes it, she leaves the imprint of her net in the ground, and the day "net" is the opening of the Venus cycle which follows "ahau" ("ajpu" in Kʼicheʼ), just as her child is the heir of Hun Hunajpu.

The uses to which the ancient Maya applied the calendar are unknown, nonetheless modern Maya communities employ the calendar as follows:

- For Maize cultivation.(The zenith transit days may have been significant for agriculture along the south coast of Guatemala because April 30 occurs just before the rainy season. Modern Maya plant their corn at the end of April or early in May. In the August 13 zenith transit the Maya initiate its current era in this day', approximating the harvest of the dried corn.
- For modern Guatemalan highlanders, the 260 days are employed in training the Aj Kʼij, or 'calendar diviner'. Nine months after commencing training in divination, the novice is "reborn" and initiated into office. The tzolkʼin is explainable, in principle, as a calendar of midwives, since it counts 260 days from the 20 day period of the conception, from when the heart of the fetus starts to beat, until birth.
- For rituals performed every 260 days. Most famous of these is the "Initiation" celebration of 8 Chuwen, Waxakibʼ Bʼatz, in the Kʼiche town of Santa Cruz del Quiche.
- For days which are suitable for certain actions. For instance, a low-numbered Akʼabʼal or Bʼen would be a good day for a wedding, whereas Kʼan would be a good day for building or maintaining a house.
- For divination based on casting lots and counting forward through the calendar from the current 'year bearer' to arrive at a day which is then interpreted. This is not pure cleromancy because somatic twitches of "blood lightning" can either be specifically consulted or arise spontaneously during the process.
- For traditional Mayan names, which are based on calendar days, often birthdays.
- Somewhat analogous to astrology, personal characteristics are believed to be influenced by the name of the day on which a person was born, and the success of some particular types of endeavor depend on carrying them out on a day whose name is auspicious for those actions.

== Origins ==
The 260-day calendar spread throughout the Mesoamerican cultural region and is regarded as the oldest and most important of the calendar systems, with an origin predating its first appearances in Maya inscriptions. The earliest evidence of this calendar comes from a possible day sign with a dot numeral coefficient in an Olmec-like inscription in Oxtotitlán cave dated to 800-500 BCE. Some of the next oldest calendric inscriptions are from early strata of Zapotec in the Oaxacan highlands at sites such as Monte Albán, dating from mid-1st millennium BCE. A few earlier-dated inscriptions and artifacts have what appear to be calendric glyphs, such as at San José Mogote and in the Olmec Gulf Coast region. However, either the dating method or the calendric nature of the glyphs are disputed by scholars. The earliest unequivocal written record is a 7 Deer day sign found in mural paintings at the central lowland Maya site of San Bartolo, Guatemala, dated to the 3rd century BCE, but it is now obvious that the origin of the 260-day is much earlier. An archaeoastronomical study has shown that a number of architectural complexes built in the late second and early first millennia BCE in the area along the southern Gulf coast in Mexico are oriented to the Sun's positions on the horizon on certain dates, separated by multiples of 13 and 20 days. Since these were elementary periods of the 260-day cycle, the orientations marking these intervals can only be explained in association with this calendar. The dating of the earliest constructions indicates that it was in use by 1100 BCE.

The original purpose of such a calendar, with no obvious relation to any astronomical or geophysical cycle, is not securely known, but there are several theories. One theory is that the calendar came from mathematical operations based on the numbers thirteen and twenty, which were important numbers to the Maya. The number twenty was the basis of the Maya counting system, taken from the total number of human digits. (See Maya numerals). Thirteen symbolized the number of levels in the Upperworld where the gods lived, and is also cited by modern daykeepers as the number of "joints" in the human body (ankles, knees, hips, shoulders, elbows, wrists, and neck). The numbers multiplied together equal 260.

Barbara Tedlock studied this system in the contemporary Kʼiche Maya community of the municipality of Momostenango in highland Guatemala. She underwent a formal apprenticeship in calendar divination with a local adept, and was initiated as a diviner in 1976. She says: "The Momostecan calendar embraces both the 260-day cycle and the 365-day solar year, with the four Classic Maya Year-bearers, or Mam, systematically linking the two. The 260-day cycle is conceived as linked firmly to worldly or earthly affairs, mirroring no astronomical period but rather the period of human gestation. Past ethnographic accounts of this cycle contain various conflicting opinions as to what its first day is, but a comparison of the present results and those of previous studies indicates that there is no fixed first day."

Anthony Aveni asserts, "Once a Maya genius may have recognized that somewhere deep within the calendar system lay the miraculous union, the magical crossing point of a host of time cycles: 9 moons, 13 times 20, a birth cycle, a planting cycle, a Venus cycle, a sun cycle, an eclipse cycle. The number 260 was tailor made for the Maya". Others have observed that the "Venus Table" in the Dresden Codex, is an accurate ephemeris for predicting Venus positions. Others have also observed a basis for the 260-day cycle in the agricultural cycle of highland Guatemala, which is also about 260 days. Aveni notes that "the average duration between successive halves of the eclipse season, at 173 ½ days, fits into the tzolkin in the ratio of 3 to 2." This may seem contrived, but the Maya did employ the tzolkin to predict positions of Venus and eclipses.

Another theory is that the 260-day period is the length of human pregnancy. This is close to the average number of days between the first missed menstrual period and birth, unlike Naegele's rule which is 40 weeks (280 days) between the last menstrual period and birth. It is postulated that midwives originally developed the calendar to predict babies' expected birth dates.

Vincent Malmström identifies a correlation between the 260-day cycle and the 260-day gap between zenithal passages of the sun. According to this hypothesis, the 260-day cycle originated in the narrow latitudinal band (14°42′N to 15°N) in which the sun is vertically overhead about 12–13 August and again 260 days later about 30 April – 1 May (Malmström identifies the proto-Classic Izapan culture as one suitable candidate at this latitude). This period may have been used for the planting schedule of maize. However, others object to this conception, noting that while the 260-day calendar runs continuously the interval between autumn-spring and spring-autumn positions alternates between 260 and 105 days, and that the earliest-known calendric inscriptions are from considerably farther north of this zone. Consequently, this theory is not widely supported.

It is also possible that the number 260 has multiple sources.

== The tzolkʼin and the New Age movement ==
The tzolkʼin is the basis for the modern, New Age invention of the "Dreamspell" calendar, developed by the esoteric author José Argüelles. The Dreamspell calendar is sometimes mistakenly identified as an authentic interpretation or extension of the original Maya calendar, although Argüelles himself acknowledges the Dreamspell calendar is a new and syncretic creation, inspired by elements from Mesoamerican and non-Mesoamerican sources.

In 1987, before the Harmonic Convergence, inspired by a single paragraph of Argüelles's book "The Mayan Factor" (wherein he refers to each day as a "tone"), singer/songwriter and sound healer, Alyras (aka Mirai), translated the tzolkʼin's harmonic values into sound, with the tutelage of Barbara Hero. Eschewing extensions of the tzolkʼin, Alyras opted for strict mathematical adherence to the tzolkʼin's fundamental structure and sequences, in order to present a truly authentic sonic expression of its inner workings.

In 1995, Maria von Boisse translated the mathematical matrix of the tzolkʼin to musical notes and set them into music. The final version of the work was developed in collaboration with Hubert Bognermayr in the Electronic Försterhaus in Linz, Austria.

In 1998, composer Michael John Wiley discovered mathematical and aesthetic correlations between the tzolk'in vigesimal count and the naturally occurring overtone series found in music, yielding the composition Tzolkin in C Major", which was premiered by the Tokyo Philharmonic Orchestra in Japan, 2002, taking 3rd Prize at the prestigious Toru Takemitsu Composition Award, and subsequently developed into a Tzolkin Cultural Meditation, an audio/visual presentation of the 260 day calendar and timing matrix.

== See also ==
- Haabʼ
- Mesoamerican calendars
- Tonalpohualli
