= Munro S. Edmonson =

American linguist

Munro Sterling Edmonson (May 18, 1924 – February 15, 2002) was an American linguist and anthropologist, renowned for his contributions to the study of Mesoamerican languages and Mesoamerican cultural heritage. At the time of his death in 2002, Edmonson was Professor (Emeritus) in Anthropology at Tulane University, New Orleans.

Edmonson authored a 1971 edition of the Popol Vuh entitled The Book of Counsel: The Popol Vuh of the Quiche Maya of Guatemala published by the Middle American Research Institute (MARI) at Tulane University in New Orleans. His edition was the first to espouse the theory of multiple Popol Vuh manuscripts.

In February 2002 Edmonson died in New Orleans, at the age of 77 from an incurable blood disease.
