= Maya Hero Twins =

Mythological protagonists of the Popol Vuh

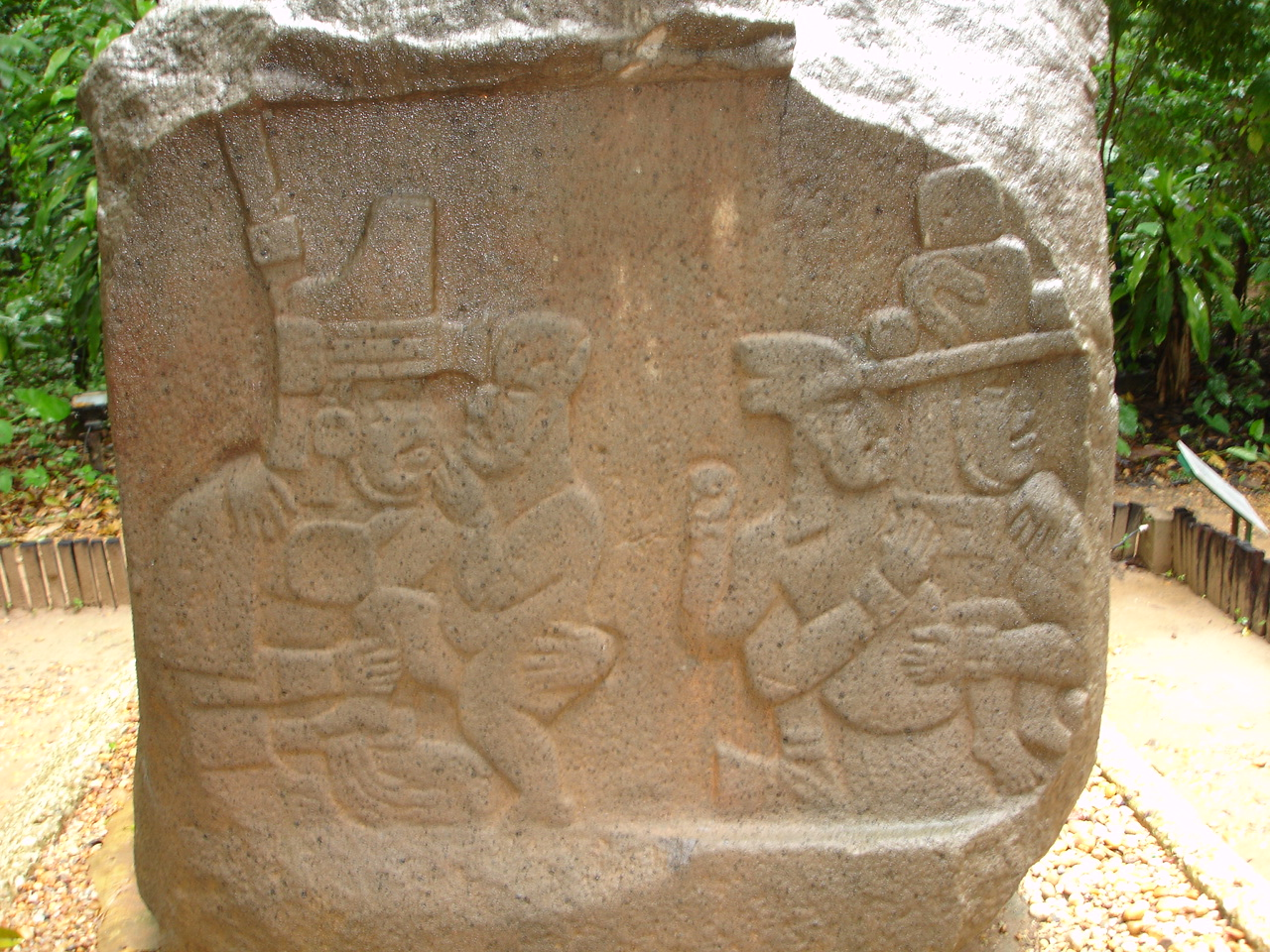
Two lively were-jaguar babies on the left side of La Venta Altar 5. The two were-jaguars depicted on Altar 5 at La Venta as being carried out from a niche or cave, places often associated with the emergence of human beings, may or may not be mythic hero twins essential to Olmec mythology and perhaps, or perhaps not, forerunners of the Maya Hero Twins.

The Maya Hero Twins are the central figures of a narrative included within the colonial Kʼicheʼ document called Popol Vuh, and constituting the oldest Maya myth to have been preserved in its entirety. Called Hunahpu [hunaxˈpu] and Xbalanque [ʃɓalaŋˈke] in the Kʼicheʼ language, the Twins have also been identified in the art of the Classic Mayas (200–900 AD). The twins are often portrayed as complementary forces.

The Twin motif recurs in many Native American mythologies. Classical rulers often claimed to be descendants or supernatural ancestors who were linked to the Hero Twins or other mythological figures depicted in royal art. The Hero Twins were not always regarded as the founders of all Mayan dynasties.

== In word and image ==
After being invited to Xibalba, the underworld, by One Death and Seven Death, the Lords of Xibalba, to a game of Pok Ta Pok, the Mesoamerican ballgame, Hun Hunahpu ('One Hunahpu') and Wucub Hunahpu ('Seven Hunahpu') were defeated and executed as a result. Hun-Hunahpu's head was put in a tree. When Blood Moon, the daughter of Blood Gatherer, one of the Lords of the Underworld, passes by the tree, his head speaks to her and then impregnates her with his spittle. Her father finds out that she is pregnant and convenes with One Death and Seven Death. They decide that if Blood Moon is not willing to tell them who the father is, she should be killed. Blood Moon truthfully answers that she has not slept with anyone, which is taken as a lie because she is visibly pregnant. Thus, they order their Owl Messengers to kill her and bring back her heart as proof.

Blood Moon then tells the owls the truth and they agree to spare her. They create a faux heart out of red tree sap, which they bring back to the Lords of the Xibalba. The owls then show her the way to the world above. Here she goes to the house of Xmucane, the mother of Hun Hunahpu and Vucub Hunahpu, who lives with One-Monkey and One-Artisan, the firstborn children of Hun Hunahpu, whom he conceived with Egret Woman. Blood Moon tells Xmucane she is pregnant with her grandchildren. Xmucane at first does not believe her and orders her—as a trial—to pick a big netful of corn ears from the garden of One-Monkey and One-Artisan. When Blood Moon arrives in the garden, however, there is only one maize plant. She calls upon the Guardians of Food, and the corn plant magically produces enough ears to fill the net.

Xmucane now recognizes that Blood Moon is telling the truth. She later gives birth to the children, Hunahpu and Xbalanque. The sons—or 'Twins'—grow up to avenge their father, and after many trials, finally defeated the lords of the Underworld in a ballgame. The Popol Vuh features other episodes involving the Twins as well (see below), including the destruction of a pretentious bird demon, Vucub Caquix, and of his two demonic sons. The Twins also turned their half-brothers into the howler monkey gods, patrons of artists and scribes. The Twins were finally transformed into sun and moon, signaling the beginning of a new age. The Qʼeqchiʼ myth of Sun and Moon, where Xbalanque is hunting for deer (a metaphor for taking captives, the deer is the child of the Earth Deity), and capturing the daughter of the Earth Deity. In these cases, Hunahpu has no role to play.

=== Iconography ===
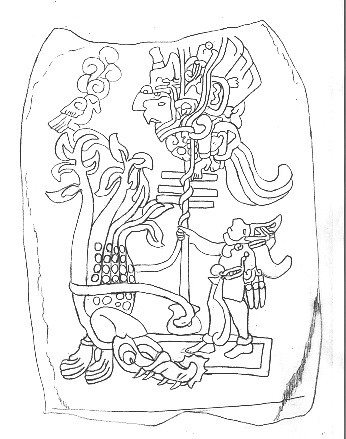
The Hero Twins shooting a perched bird demon with a blowgun. Izapa, stela 25.

Another main source for Hero Twin mythology is much earlier and consists of representations found on Maya ceramics until about 900 AD and in the Dresden Codex some centuries later. Clearly recognizable are the figures of Hunahpu, Xbalanque, and the howler monkey scribes and sculptors. Hunahpu is distinguished by black spots on his skin, interpreted as the stains of a corpse or as pustules. On the Preclassic murals from San Bartolo, the king, marked with a black spot on the cheek, and drawing blood from his genitals in the four corners of the world, appears to personify the hero Hunahpu. Xbalanque—the 'War Twin'—is more animal-like, in that he is distinguished by jaguar patches on his skin and by whiskers or a beard.

Certain iconographic scenes are suggestive of episodes in the Popol Vuh. The Twins' shooting of a steeply descending bird (the 'Principal Bird Deity') with blowguns may represent the defeat of Vucub-Caquix, whereas the principal Maya maize god rising from the carapace of a turtle in the presence of the Hero Twins may visualize the resurrection of the Twins' father, Hun-Hunahpu. This second scene has also been explained differently, however. In any case, the Twins are often depicted together with the Maya maize god, and these three semi-divinities were obviously felt to belong together. Therefore, it is probably no coincidence that in the Popol Vuh, the Twins are symbolically represented by two maize stalks.

=== Names and calendrical functions ===
The name "Xbalanque" (pronounced [ʃɓalaŋˈke]) has been variously translated as 'Jaguar Sun' (x-balam-que), 'Hidden Sun' (x-balan-que), and 'Jaguar Deer' (x-balam-quieh). The initial sound may stem from yax (precious), since in Classical Maya a hieroglyphic element with this meaning precedes the pictogram of the hero (although it has also been suggested that it is the female prefix ix-). For the combination of the prefix and the pictogram, a reading of Yax Balam has been proposed. The name "Hunahpu" (pronounced [hunaxˈpu]) is usually understood as Hun-ahpub 'One Blowgunner', the blowgun characterizing the youthful hero as a hunter of birds.

The head of Hunahpu is used as a variant sign for the 20th day in the day count or tzolkʼin, which in these cases may actually have been read as (Hun)ahpu, rather than Ahau (Lord or King). The 20th day is also the concluding day of all vigesimal periods, including the kʼatun and baktun. The head of Xbalanque is used as a variant for the number nine (balan being similar to bolon 'nine').

== Twin myth summary ==
The following is a detailed summary of the Popol Vuh Twin Myth, on from the death of the heroes' father and uncle.

=== Early life of the heroes ===
Hunahpu and his brother were conceived when their mother Xquic, daughter of one of the lords of Xibalba, spoke with the severed head of their father Hun. The skull spat upon the maiden's hand, which caused the twins to be conceived in her womb. Xquic sought out Hun Hunahpu's mother, who begrudgingly took her as a ward after setting up a number of trials to prove her identity.

Even after birth, Hunahpu and Xbalanque were not well treated by their grandmother or their older half-brothers, One Howler Monkey and One Artisan. Immediately after their births, their grandmother demanded they be removed from the house for their crying, and their elder brothers obliged by placing them on an anthill and among the brambles. Their intent was to kill their younger half-brothers out of jealousy and spite, for the older pair had long been revered as fine artisans and thinkers and feared the newcomers would steal from the attention they received.

The attempts to kill the young twins after birth were a failure, and the boys grew up without any obvious spite for their ill-natured older siblings. During their younger years, the twins were made to labor, going to hunt birds which they brought back for meals. The elder brothers were given their food to eat first, in spite of the fact they spent the day singing and playing while the younger twins were working.

Hunahpu and Xbalanque demonstrated their wit at a young age in dealing with their older half brothers. One day, the pair returned from the field without any birds to eat and were questioned by their older siblings. The younger boys claimed that they had indeed shot several birds but that they had gotten caught high in a tree and were unable to retrieve them. The older brothers were brought to the tree and climbed up to get the birds when the tree suddenly began to grow even taller, and the older brothers were caught. This is also the first instance in which the twins demonstrate supernatural powers, or perhaps simply the blessings of the greater gods; the feats of power are often only indirectly attributed to the pair.

Hunahpu further humiliated his older brethren by instructing them to remove their loincloths and tie them about their waists in an attempt to climb down. The loincloths became tails, and the brothers were transformed into monkeys. When their grandmother was informed that the older boys had not been harmed, she demanded they be allowed to return. When they did come back to the home, their grandmother was unable to contain her laughter at their appearance, and the disfigured brothers ran away in shame.

=== Defeat of Seven Macaw and his family ===
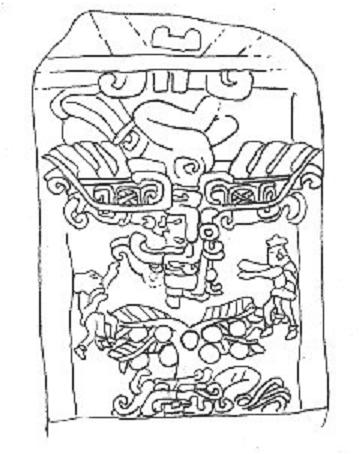
The Hero Twins and steeply descending bird impersonator, Izapa Stela 2.

At a point in their lives not specified in the Popol Vuh, the twins were approached by the god Huracan regarding an arrogant god named Seven Macaw (Vucub Caquix). Seven Macaw had built up a following of worshipers among some of the inhabitants of the Earth, making false claims to be either the sun or the moon. Seven Macaw was also extremely vain, adorning himself with metal ornaments in his wings and a set of false teeth made of gemstones.

In a first attempt to dispatch the vain god, the twins attempted to sneak up on him as he was eating his meal in a tree, and shot at his jaw with a blowgun. Seven Macaw was knocked from his tree but only wounded, and as Hunahpu attempted to escape, his arm was grabbed by the god and torn off.

In spite of their initial failure, the twins again demonstrated their clever nature in formulating a plan for Seven Macaw's defeat. Invoking a pair of gods disguised as grandparents, the twins instructed the invoked gods to approach Seven Macaw and negotiate for the return of Hunahpu's arm. In doing so, the "grandparents" indicated they were but a poor family, making a living as doctors and dentists and attempting to care for their orphaned grandchildren. Upon hearing this, Seven Macaw requested that his teeth be fixed since they had been shot and knocked loose by the blowgun, and his eyes cured (it is not specifically said what ailed his eyes). In doing so, the grandparents replaced his jeweled teeth with white corn and plucked the ornaments he had about his eyes, leaving the god destitute of his former greatness. Having fallen, Seven Macaw died, presumably of shame.

Seven Macaw's sons, Zipacna and Cabrakan, inherited much of their father's arrogance, claiming to be the creator and destroyer of mountains, respectively. The elder son, Zipacna, was destroyed when the twins tricked him with the lure of a fake crab, burying him beneath a mountain in the process.

The Maya god Huracan again implored the young twins for help in dealing with Seven Macaw's younger son, Cabrakan, the Earthquake. Again, it was primarily through their cleverness that the pair brought about their enemy's downfall, having sought him out and then using his very arrogance against him; they told the story of a great mountain they had encountered that kept growing and growing. Cabrakan prided himself on being the one to bring down the mountains, and upon hearing such a tale, he predictably demanded to be shown the mountain. Hunahpu and Xbalanque obliged, leading Cabrakan toward the non-existent mountain. Being skilled hunters, they shot down several birds along the way, roasting them over fires and playing upon Cabrakan's hunger. When he asked for some meat, he was given a bird that had been prepared with plaster and gypsum, a poison to the god. Upon eating it, he was weakened, and the boys were able to bind him and cast him into a hole in the earth, burying him forever.

=== Discovery of One Hunahpu's gaming equipment ===
Sometime after the expulsion of their older siblings, the twins used their special powers or abilities to expedite their gardening chores for their grandmother—a single swing of the axe would do a full day's worth of clearing, for example. The pair covered themselves in dust and wood chippings when their grandmother approached to make it seem they had been hard at work, in spite of the fact they spent the whole day relaxing. However, the next day they returned to find their work undone by the animals of the forest. Upon completion of their work, they hid and lay in wait, and when the animals returned, they attempted to catch or scare them off.

Most animals eluded their capture. The rabbit and the deer they caught by the tail, but these tails broke off, thus giving all future generations of rabbits and deer short tails. The rat, however, they did capture, singeing his tail over the fire in revenge for the act. In exchange for mercy, the rat revealed an important piece of information: the gaming equipment of their father and uncle was hidden by their grandmother in her grief, for it was playing ball that was directly responsible for the deaths of her sons.

Again, a ruse was devised to get their equipment, the twins once more relying upon trickery to meet their goals. The pair sneaked the rat into their home during dinner and had their grandmother cook a meal of hot chili sauce. They demanded water for their meal, which their grandmother went to retrieve. The jar of water, however, had been sabotaged with a hole, and she was unable to return with the water. When their mother left to find out why and the pair were alone in the home, they sent the rat up into the roof to gnaw apart the ropes that held the equipment hidden and were able to retrieve the equipment their father and uncle had used to play ball. It had long been a favorite past-time for their father, and soon would become a favored activity for them as well.

=== Xibalban ballgames ===
Hunahpu and Xbalanque played ball in the same court that their father and his brother had played in long before them. When One Hunahpu and his brother had played, the noise had disturbed the Lords of Xibalba, rulers of the Maya Underworld. The Xibalbans summoned them to play ball in their own court.

When the twins began to play ball in the court, once again the Lords of Xibalba were disturbed by the racket, and sent summons to the boys to come to Xibalba and play in their court. Fearing they would suffer the same fate, their grandmother relayed the message only indirectly, telling it to a louse which was hidden in a toad's mouth, which was in turn hidden in the belly of a snake in a falcon. Nevertheless, the boys did receive the message, and much to their grandmother's dismay, set off to Xibalba.

When their father had answered the summons, he and his brother were met with a number of challenges along the way which served to confuse and embarrass them before their arrival, but the younger twins would not fall victim to the same tricks. They sent a mosquito ahead of them to bite at the Lords and uncover which were real and which were simply mannequins, as well as uncovering their identities. When they arrived at Xibalba, they were easily able to identify which were the real Lords of Xibalba and address them by name. They also turned down the Lords' invitation to sit on a bench for visitors, correctly identifying the bench as a heated stone for cooking. Frustrated by the twins' ability to see through their traps, they sent the boys away to the Dark House, the first of several deadly tests devised by the Xibalbans.

Their father and uncle had suffered embarrassing defeats in each of the tests, but again Hunahpu and Xbalanque demonstrated their prowess by outwitting the Xibalbans on the first of the tests. The twins placed macaw feathers in the torch and fireflies on the tips of their cigars, making the Xibalbans believe that they kept their torches and cigars lit all night. Dismayed, the Xibalbans bypassed the remaining tests and invited the boys directly to the game. The Xibalbans insisted on using their own ball for the game, and the twins consented. The ball, however, was a skull with a blade inside of it, and when Hunahpu hit the ball, the weapon was revealed. Complaining that they had been summoned only to be killed, Hunahpu and Xbalanque threatened to leave the game.

As a compromise, the Lords of Xibalba allowed the boys to use their own rubber ball, and a long and proper game ensued. In the end, the twins allowed the Xibalbans to win the game, but this was again a part of their ruse. They were sent to Razor House, the second deadly test of Xibalba, filled with knives that moved of their own accord. The twins spoke to the knives, and promised them the flesh of all animals in the future. In exchange, the knives stopped moving. Then, they sent leafcutter ants to retrieve petals from the gardens of Xibalba, a reward to be offered to the Lords for their victory. The Lords had intentionally chosen a reward they thought impossible, for the flowers were guarded by birds. The birds however, failed to notice as the ants trimmed the flowers. The Xibalbans were furious upon receiving bowls of their own flower petals, and split open the birds' beaks, giving nightjars their distinctive gape.

Each of the following days resulted in a tied game and a new test. In the Cold House, the twins kept the cold at bay by pure willpower. In the Jaguar House, they fed the jaguars bones to survive. In the Fire House, the twins were sightly singed, but not burned. The Lords of Xibalba were dismayed at the twins success until the twins were placed in Bat House. Though they hid inside their blowguns from the deadly bats, Hunahpu peeked out to see if daylight had come, and was decapitated by a killer bat.

Xbalanque summoned the beasts of the field and asked them to bring him their food. The coatimundi brought a squash, which Xbalanque placed on Hunahpu's body. Xbalanque then asked the rabbit to distract the Xibalbans when the ball landed outside the court. The new game begun, and Hunahpu's head was used as the ball. When Hunahpu's head went off the court, however, the Xibalbans mistook the bouncing of the rabbit for the ball, and chased after it. Xbalanque then retrieved his brother's head, and replaced the ball with the squash. The game continued until the squash burst, resulting in an embarrassing defeat for the Xibalbans.

=== Downfall of Xibalba ===
Embarrassed by their defeat, the Xibalbans still sought to destroy the twins. They had a great oven constructed and once again summoned the boys, intending to trick them into the oven and to their deaths. The twins realized that the Lords intended this ruse to be the end of them, yet, despite this, allowed themselves to be burned to death in the oven and the ashes of their bones ground into dust. The Xibalbans were elated at the apparent demise of the twins and cast their ashes into a river. This was, however, a part of the plan devised by the boys, for, once in the river, the ashes regenerated into bodies – at first those of a pair of catfish, which transformed in turn into those of a pair of young boys.

Unrecognized, the boys were allowed to remain among the Xibalbans. Tales of their transformation from catfish spread, as well as tales of their dances and the way they entertained the people of Xibalba. They performed a number of miracles, setting fire to homes and then bringing them back whole from the ashes, sacrificing one another and rising from the dead. When the Lords of Xibalba heard the tale, they summoned the pair to their court to entertain them, demanding to see such miracles for themselves.

The boys answered the summons and volunteered to entertain the Lords at no cost. Their identities remained secret for the moment, claiming to be orphans and vagabonds, and the Lords were none the wiser. They went through their gamut of miracles, slaying a dog and bringing it back from the dead, causing the Lords' house to burn around them while the inhabitants were unharmed, and then bringing the house back from the ashes. In a climactic performance, Xbalanque cut Hunahpu apart and offered him as a sacrifice, only to have the older brother rise once again from the dead.

Enthralled by the performance, One Death and Seven Death, the highest lords of Xibalba, demanded that the miracle be performed upon them. The twins obliged by killing and offering the lords as a sacrifice, but did not bring them back from the dead. The twins then shocked the Xibalbans by revealing their identities as Hunahpu and Xbalanque, sons of One Hunahpu whom they had slain years ago along with their uncle Seven Hunahpu. The Xibalbans despaired, confessed to the crimes of killing the brothers years ago, and begged for mercy. As a punishment for their crimes, the realm of Xibalba was no longer to be a place of greatness, and the Xibalbans would no longer receive offerings from the people who walked on the Earth above. All of Xibalba had effectively been defeated.

The twins returned to the ballcourt and retrieved the buried remains of their father, Hun Hunahpu.

Their mission accomplished, the pair left Xibalba, climbing back to the surface of the Earth; but they did not, however, stop there and continued climbing straight on up into the sky – Hunahpu became the Sun, and Xbalanque became the Moon.

== Hero Twins in other Native American cultures ==
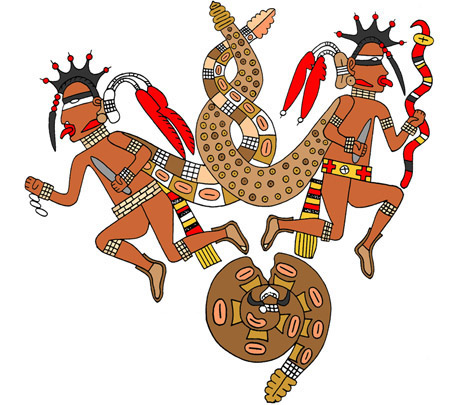
Mississippian culture Hero Twins emerging from a crack in the back of a raccoon-faced Horned Serpent. Redrawn from an engraved whelk shell by artist Herb Roe.

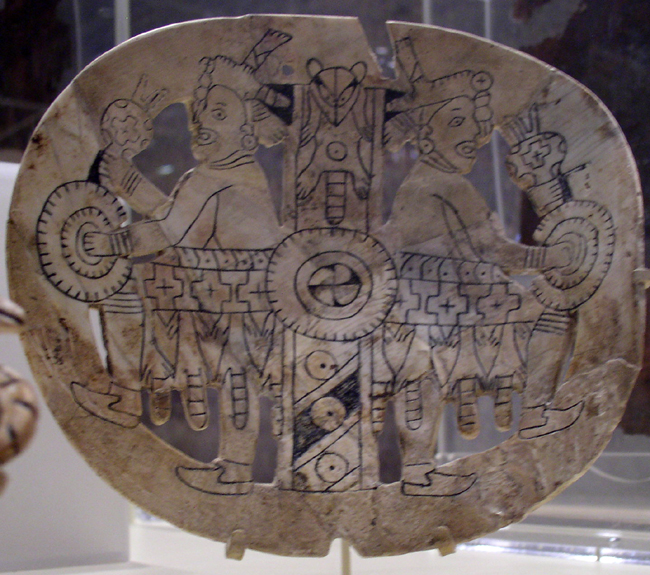
Possible representation of Hero Twins on an engraved shell gorget from Spiro Mounds, Oklahoma

Many Native American cultures in the United States have traditions of two male hero twins. For instance, in the Diné Bahaneʼ, the creation myth of the Navajo, the hero twins Monster Slayer and Born for Water (sons of Asdzą́ą́ Nádleehé 'Changing Woman') acquire lightning bolt arrows from their father, the Sun, in order to rid the world of monsters that prey upon the people.

The Ho-Chunk and other Siouan-speaking peoples have a tradition of Red Horn and his two sons. The mythology of Red Horn and his two sons has some interesting analogies with the Maya Hero Twins cycle.

== In popular culture ==
- Xbalanque is a playable character in the free downloadable Video game Smite, where his title is "The Hidden Jaguar Sun".
- Xbalanque is a character in the free downloadable video game Genshin Impact, where his title is “The One Entombed With Primal Fire”. He is the first Pyro Archon of Natlan and also appears in current Pyro Archon Mavuika's story quest.
- The 2014 From Dusk Till Dawn Series hints at a prophecy about the Gecko Brothers being The "Hero Twins" of Maya legend.
- Hunahpu was the name of one of the tribes in Survivor: San Juan del Sur.
- The Hero Twins appear in the opening of the 2000 animated film The Road to El Dorado. They are also the gods that the main characters Miguel and Tulio impersonate.
- The Hero Twins appear in the Civilization VI Heroes & Legends game mode.
- The hero twins are alluded to in Onyx Equinox, with the main characters K'in and Yun having names that literally mean "sun" and "moon" and having a love for ballgame sports. A relief of the mythological twins is seen in episode 3.
- The hero twins (and potential future reincarnations of them) are the central characters in Monica Byrne's science fiction novel, The Actual Star, which is about finding Xibalba in time as well as in space.
- The hero twins were the inspiration for the first episode of the reboot Legends of the Hidden Temple.
- The Maya Hero twins appeared as a demigoddess named Maya from Maya and the Three who will defeat the evil Lord Mictlan.

== See also ==
- Jaguars in Mesoamerican cultures
- Maya religion
- Maya mythology
- Twins in mythology
- Divine twins
- HD 98219
- List of lunar deities
- List of solar deities
