= Xquic =

Maya goddess

Ixquic
- Mother goddess of the Maya Hero Twins
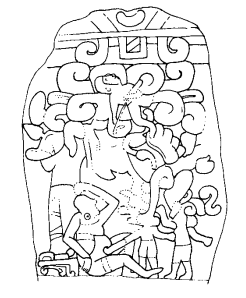
- Xquic gives birth to the Hero Twins Hunahpu and Xbalanque, Stela 10 from Izapa, Mexico
- Other names: Xkik'
- Major cult center: Izapa
- Abode: Xibalba
- Gender: Female
- Region: Mesoamerica

Genealogy
- Parents: Cuchumaquic (father)
- Children: Hunahpu and Xbalanque

Xquic (or Ixquic /ˈʃkikʼ/, ALMG / INALI: Xkikʼ, sometimes glossed as "Blood Moon" or "Blood Girl/Maiden" in English) is a mythological figure in the myth of the Hero Twins known from the stelae of Izapa, Mexico and the 16th century Kʼicheʼ manuscript Popol Vuh. She was a maiden and the daughter of one of the lords of Xibalba, who became pregnant by the god Hun Hunahpu while being a virgin and became the mother goddess of the Hero Twins, Hunahpu and Xbalanque. The myth of Ixquic and the Twin Gods originated at the ancient site of Izapa in Mexico dating back to the Preclassic period of Mesoamerica, her earliest representation is found on the stela 10 from Izapa, which contains a complex mythological scene depicting Ixquic after giving birth to the twins Hunahpú and Ixbalanqué, who appear at her side and under the tree into which the head of Hun-Hunahpú was transformed after being severed.

This scene was narrated centuries later in the Popol Vuh, where according to the story, she was the daughter of Cuchumaquic, one of the Lords of Xibalba (Xibalba being the Maya underworld). She heard about Hun Hunahpu, a god who after being defeated in a ball game was decapitated and his head had been transformed into a tree. She visited the tree and became pregnant when Hun Hunahpu put saliva on her hand. The lords of Xibalbá decided to sacrifice her when they noticed her pregnancy, considering it a disgrace, but she managed to escape from the underworld. She went out into the overworld and looked for Ixmucane, the mother of Hun Hunahpu with whom she lived after demonstrating her powers and later gave birth to the twin gods Hunahpu and Xbalanque.

== Izapa Stela 10 ==
Stela 10 from the archaeological site of Izapa, Mexico contains the oldest representation of the myth of Ixquic and the birth of the Maya Hero Twins, this monument is dated around 300 BC in the Preclassic period of Mesoamerica, and is part of a series of stelae from Izapa that depict various mythological passages of the twin gods that were the antecedent to later representations. Izapa stela 10 is finely carved with several important narrative and iconographic elements from the myth of Ixquic, a maiden of the underworld who heard the story of god Hun-Hunahpú who was decapitated and whose head became a tree after being defeated by the lords of Xibalba in a ball game, she decided to visit him and was miraculously impregnated by the god, later giving birth to two twins known as Hunahpu and Xbalanque. In the iconography of Stela 10, Ixquic is depicted pregnant lying under the tree from which the severed head of Hun Hunahpu dressed as a ball player sprouts, just as the mythological story tells it, and at her side are two twins who are their sons, Hunahpu and Xbalanque. Izapa stelae are the only known reference to Ixquic in pre-Columbian art.

== Tale summary ==
In the account told by the Popol Vuh centuries after from the Izapa stelae, Xquic went to investigate a calabash tree where the Lords of Xibalba had displayed the severed head of Hun Hunahpu, whom they had sacrificed. Upon arriving she was curious as to the strange fruit that it bore, in the shape of a skull, and the head of Hun Hunahpu instructed the maiden to reach out and take one. As she did so the skull spat upon her hand, and through this act she became pregnant with Hun Hunahpu's twin sons.

When six months had passed and her pregnancy obvious, she was questioned regarding the father. She honestly answered that she had known no man's face (the Maya equivalent of the biblical "know", and a play on the fact that a skull has no face). The fetuses she carried were declared to be bastards, and the Lords of Xibalba sentenced her to be sacrificed in exile. The messengers who had been sent to escort her far from the city and to sacrifice her had pity on the woman, and fashioned a false heart out of tree sap to return to the Lords. They were unable to see through the deceit, and were subsequently tricked into accepting burned sacrifices that were not genuine. xibalba

Xquic sought the protection of Xmucane, the mother of Hun Hunahpu, identifying herself as the woman's daughter-in-law. Knowing her sons to be dead, Xmucane demanded proof of the fetuses' lineage, and devised a test for the maiden. If she could go into the garden and return with a sack full of corn she would be accepted. There was however but one stalk of corn to be found. Xquic was able to pass the test by invoking two female daybearers related to corn (Ixtoj and Ixqʼanil, also called Ixkakaw and Ixtziya), and then plucking the corn silk from the ear, which transformed into corn, thus filling the net sack. Xmucane initially responded angrily to Xquic's success, but after seeing the impression her net had left on the ground in the garden, was convinced of the truth of Xquic's story. Dennis Tedlock suggests that the net impression is a reference to the daybearer Kʼat and a thus possible reference to the emergence of Venus as a morning star; Xmucane, one of the original pair of daykeepers, was certainly able to read such signs.

After being accepted into the household and giving birth to her sons alone "at the mountain", Xquic's significance in the story is greatly diminished, and while she is mentioned again in a few places in short conversations, her role as an active player in the creation myth seems to end. She is sometimes considered to be the Maya goddess associated with the waning moon. However, there is no evidence for this in the Popol Vuh text itself.
