= Cabrakan =

Maya god of earthquakes and mountains

Cabrakan (also known as Caprakan, Cabracan, and Kab'raqan) was a Maya god of earthquakes and mountains. Cabrakan is a son of Vucub-Caquix and the brother of Zipacna. He serves as a minor character in the Popol Vuh, where the Maya Hero Twins defeat him.

He has been called the Maya equivalent to Tepēyōllōtl.

== Appearance ==
Cabrakan and Zipacna, his brother, are both typically depicted as massive crocodiles or caimans.

== Family Ties ==
Cabrakan is the son of the Seven Macaw, Vucub-Caquix (father) and Chimalmat (mother). His brother is Zipacna, who is called a demon and was known for raising mountains. Cabrakan is known for being arrogant and violent, like his relatives. As Zipacna would raise mountains, which would destroy the land, Cabrakan would destroy them, and they both would revel in the destruction.

== Popol Vuh Appearance ==
The Hero Twins Xbalanque and Hunahphu stumbled upon him wrecking mountains, and told him of a great mountain in the East that was so big it could not be felled. Cabrakan took the bait, and boasted that no mountain could stand before him. The Hero Twins both sat on each of his shoulders, and shot birds with their blowguns on the way. Upon killing one, they coated the bird with magic earth, and cooked the bird underground. Cabrakan, arrogant and ravenous with hunger, ate it. After eating the bird, he became weaker, until they arrived at the mountain. In his weakened state, he attempted to destroy the mountain to no avail. Cabrakan collapsed, and the Hero Twins threw earth down upon him and buried him, ending his destruction.

== Geophagy ==
The practice of geophagy, or the process of eating earth, is an interesting topic of discussion for Cabrakan's ultimate defeat. It is the practice of geophagy, combined with the fact that the earth itself was magic, which defeats Cabrakan, a god of earthquakes. Using earth to weaken and destroy an earthquake god certainly possesses qualities of mysticism and irony that was certainly not lost on the ancient Maya.
