= Zipacna =

Mayan mythological figure

In Maya mythology, Zipacna was a son of Vucub Caquix (Seven Macaw) and Chimalmat. He and his brother, Cabrakan (Earthquake), were often considered demons. Zipacna, like his relatives, was said to be very arrogant and violent. Zipacna was characterized as a large caiman and often boasted about creating mountains.

== The Four Hundred Boys ==
The Popol Vuh tells the story that one day Zipacna was basking on the beach when he was disturbed by the Four Hundred Boys (possibly patron deities of alcohol), who were attempting to construct a hut. They had felled a large tree to use as the central supporting log, but were unable to lift it. Zipacna, being immensely strong, offered to carry the log for them, which he did. Although most translations of the Popol Vuh would seem to indicate this was done as a gesture of goodwill, it is generally agreed that Zipacna did so in a spirit of arrogance, mocking the boys for their inability to do so.

The Four Hundred Boys decided it was not good that one man had such strength, and that Zipacna should be killed. They attempted to deceive Zipacna by asking him to dig a hole for their post, intending to thrust the massive column into the hole and kill him. Zipacna realized their deceit, however, and saved himself by surreptitiously digging a side tunnel and hiding inside it when the boys dropped the post in the hole. To complete the illusion of his death, Zipacna cried out in pain, and later allowed ants to carry bits of his hair and trimmings from his nails out of the hole, satisfying the boys that he had been killed.

On the third day after their apparent success, the Four Hundred Boys finished the construction of their hut and celebrated both its completion and Zipacna's death by preparing wine and engaging in a drunken revelry. Zipacna emerged from his hole after the boys had passed out, and with his massive strength he felled the column and caused the house to crash down upon the sleeping boys, killing the lot without a single survivor. After their death, the boys entered into the heavens as the open cluster known as the Pleiades.

== Hero twins ==
Hunahpu and Xbalanque, the two divine Hero Twins, decided to exact revenge upon Zipacna for the death of the Four Hundred Boys; they also did so in a continuation of their quest to bring down the arrogant gods. The pair devised a scheme in which an elaborate fake crab was constructed and hid it deep in a canyon. They then sought out Zipacna along the beach, where he was hunting for his usual favorite food, crabs. Zipacna was very hungry and had been unable to locate any crabs for his meal, and the pair informed him they had spotted a very large crab for the taking. They guided Zipacna to their trap, and being overcome with hunger, he was unable to see through the trick. Zipacna went in for the crab, and by means not specified by the Popol Vuh, a mountain was made to collapse or fall over on top of him, either killing him or turning him into stone.

The account of Zipacna "entering" in search of the crab (which is specified to be a female), in particular his going in "on his back" on the second try, seems to be a parody of sexual intercourse. Indeed, it has been suggested by Christian inspired interpretations of the Popol Vuh that it was Zipacna's lust and sexual appetite, not his hunger, that drove him to his doom.

== Appearances in popular culture ==
Zipacna (Stargate)

- Zipacna appeared as a Goa'uld in the television series Stargate SG-1 (played by Kevin Durand). He first appeared in the season 3 episode "Pretense", where he was described by Teal'c as being "one of the most loyal underlords of Apophis". He later returns in season 5 as a servant of Anubis, recruiting Osiris to represent Anubis at the System Lord summit and leads the sacking of Tok'ra's secret base.
- Zipacna is a Notorious Monster in the SquareEnix game Final Fantasy XI in Ve'Lugannon Palace. He drops an item used to spawn one of the Sky guardians, Genbu—the Black Tortoise/Black Warrior of the North.
- Zipacna is the protagonist in a storyline in the webcomic Luci Phurr's Imps. He is going around trying to gather his other gods to bring about "The End of the World" foretold by the Mayan calendar.
- In the 1987 book "The Haunted Mesa" by Louis L'amour, the protagonist, Mike Raglan, discovers that the Anasazi, or "Cliff Dwellers" who once occupied the Four Corners region of the American Southwest before vanishing, had travelled through a doorway to a parallel world ruled by a being known as "The Hand" and the Lords of Shibalba (also spelled Xibalba). The chief antagonist among them (other than The Hand, who was never seen), was known as Zipacna. He was defeated but his ultimate fate was never known nor that of a young rebel named Hunahpu who was attempting to organize his people to fight back against Zipacna's forces. There was some speculation, never confirmed, that Zipacna himself was The Hand.
- In "The Shadow Crosser", the third entry of The Storm Runner series by J. C. Cervantes, has Zipacna, spelt as Sipacna, as a supporting character.
