= Vucub Caquix =

Legendary bird in Mayan myth

- False sun god
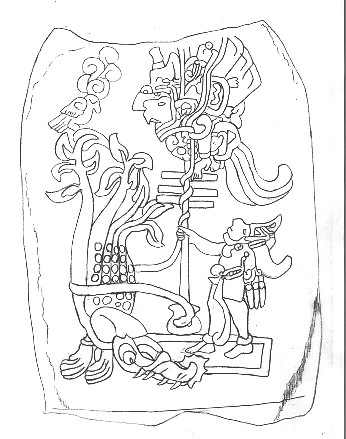
- Vucub Caquix holds the mutilated arm of Hunahpu, Stela 25 from Izapa, Mexico
- Other names: Itzam Yeh (Chʼoltiʼ)
- Age: Unknown
- Region: Mesoamerica

Genealogy
- Consort: Chimalmat
- Children: Zipacna and Cabrakan

Vucub-Caquix (K'iche': Wuqub’ Kaqix, [ʋuˈquɓ kaˈqiʃ], possibly meaning 'seven-macaw') is the name of a bird demon defeated by the Hero Twins of an ancient Maya myth preserved in an 18th-century K'iche' document, the ʼ'Popol Vuh'ʼ. The episode of the demon's defeat was already known by the end of the Mesoamerican Preclassic period, before the year 200, as represented in steles 2 and 25 at Izapa in Mexico, which is its earliest representation and the precedent of the story that was narrated in the Popol Vuh many centuries later. In his appearances, Vucub-Caquix is described as a demon bird and a false sun god with shining eyes that daily sat on a big tree to eat its fruits, he was also the father of Zipacna, an underworld demon deity, and Cabrakan, the Earthquake God.

== The Kʼicheʼ Tale ==
Vucub-Caquix is described as a powerful bird pretending to be the sun and moon of the twilight world in between the former creation and the present one. According to modern Kʼicheʼ, his name refers to the seven stars of the Big Dipper asterism. The false sun-moon bird was shot out of his tree with a blowgun by Hun-Ahpu, one of the Maya Hero Twins, but still managed to sever the hero's arm. Finally, however, the demon was deprived of his teeth, his eyes, his riches, and his power. Together, the Twins were to become the true sun and moon of the present creation. The episode is only loosely connected to the main tale of the Twins, and is varied by other Mesoamerican hero myths. It is also akin to certain scenes in Maya art dating back to the 8th century and before.

== The Twins Shooting Vucub-Caquix: Earlier Scenes ==
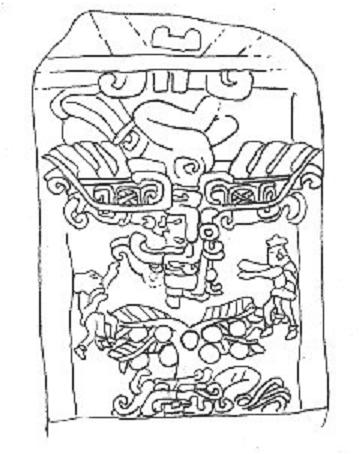
Battle between Vucub Caquix and the Hero Twins, Stela 2 from Izapa, Mexico.

The 16th-century Popol Vuh episode has been used for interpreting certain early stone monuments as well as Classic-period pottery scenes. References to the episode are already present on the Late Preclassic stela 25 from Izapa, near the Pacific coast, where a man with a mutilated arm looks upward towards a bird perched on a tree, on a ceramic plate from Quintana Roo found near Chetumal known as the Blom Plate where a finely detailed painting makes a clear representation of the scene where the Hero Twins shot Vucub Caquix with their blowgun and on a facade of the Copan ballcourt, where a war-serpent head inserted between the legs of a large bird holds the severed arm of Hunahpu. The episode has also been connected to Izapa's stela 2, where two small figures assumed to be the Twin Heroes flank a large descending bird personifier (perhaps a royal ancestor).

=== Izapa stelae ===
Stela 25 from the Izapa archaeological site in Mexico contains the earliest representation of Vucub Caquix. This ancient monument, dating from around 300 to 250 BC, depicts the mythological scene in which Hunahpu, one of the Hero Twins, loses his arm while facing Vucub Caquix. On the stele, Hunahpu appears armed with a blowgun and with his arm mutilated looking at Vucub Caquix in the heights while he holds his severed arm. Stela 25 connects with Stela 2 from Izapa, this monument illustrates the confrontation between the Hero Twins Hunahpu and Xbalanque with Vucub Caquix. This mythological scene dating from the pre-Classic Mesoamerican period is the antecedent of the narrative present in the Popol Vuh written several centuries later.

=== Blom Plate ===
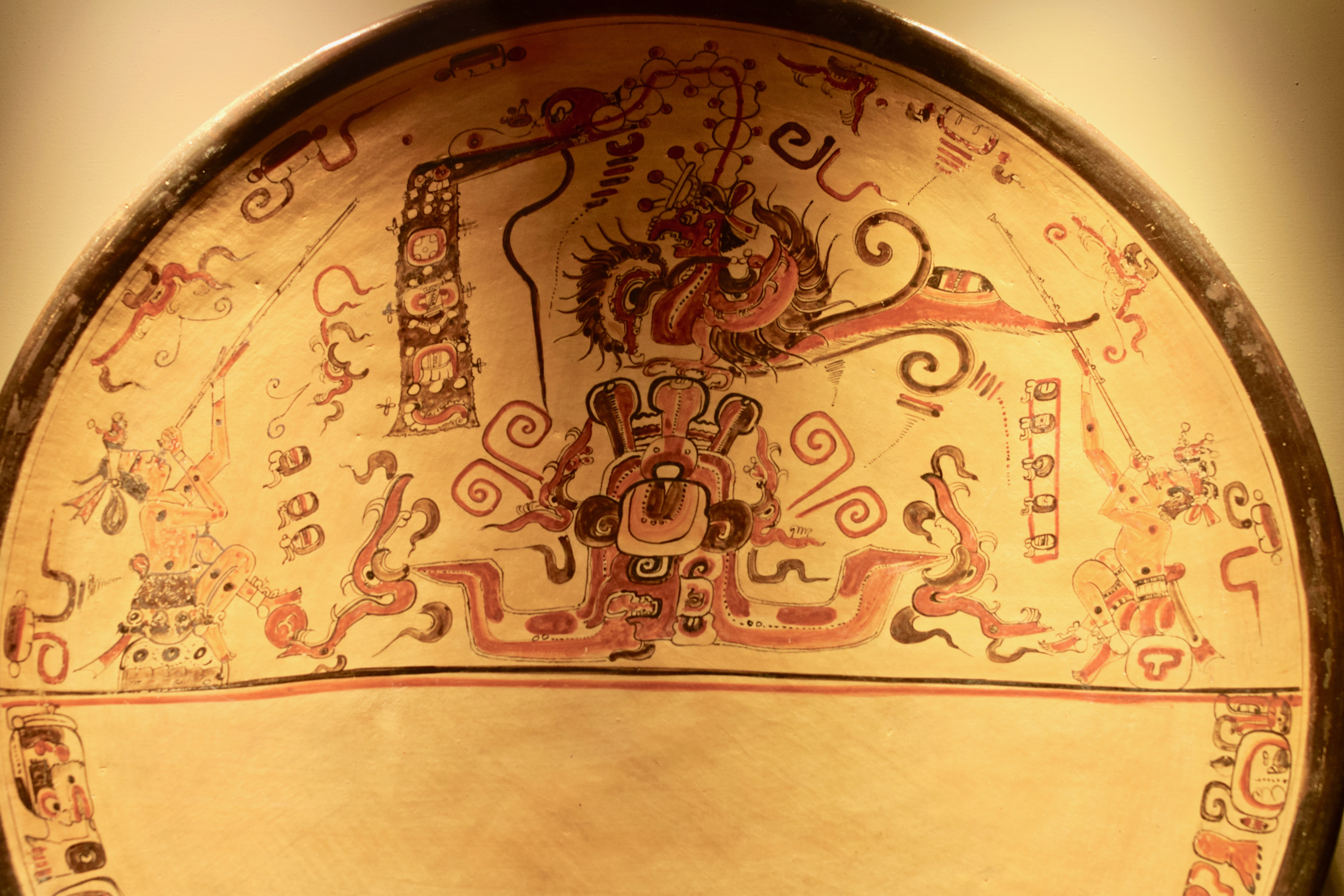
Vucub Caquix being shot by the hero twins Hunahpu and Xbalanque, Blom Plate, Mexico.

A large ceramic plate known as the Blom Plate, dating to the Late Classic Maya period discovered in southern Quintana Roo, Mexico, features a unique and finely detailed painting considered a master piece of Maya art depicting the mythological scene of the legendary battle between the hero twins Hunahpu and Xbalanque against Vucub-Caquix. The painting illustrated on the plate representes Vucub Caquix as a large bird in the center of the scene standing on a tree while on its sides the Hero Twins Hunahpu on the left and Xbalanque on the right aim and shoot at him with their blowguns to kill him. The Blom Plate was part of a burial and belonged to a local royal member with the title of ch'ok (prince), as recorded in a hieroglyphic inscription while the great iconographic quality indicates the importance of the myth.

=== Problems with the Vucub-Caquix Identifications ===
As to the Classic Maya scenes painted on pottery, they show Hun-Ahpu (or Hun-Ahau) aiming his blowgun at a steeply descending bird with the characteristics of the so-called 'Principal Bird Deity', an avian transformation of Itzamna. The solar affiliation of (Kinich Ahau) Itzamna is part of the argument for identifying the Popol Vuh and the Classic episode, since the upper god's solar aspect seems to reflect the claim to solar status voiced by Vucub-Caquix.

Leaving apart the representations on stone mentioned above, the identification of the Classic Maya bird-shooting scenes on pottery with the shooting of Vucub-Caquix causes problems. For one, the bird involved is usually the avian transformation of the creator god, Itzamna, and the concept of a generally venerated creator god seems to be at odds with the demonic nature of Vucub-Caquix. Secondly, the shooting of the Principal Bird Deity includes elements foreign to the Quichean tale. The bird is clearly not a macaw, and instead of being perched in a tree, it can even assume the (deceptive?) shape of a heron or cormorant-like bird seated on the waters. Thirdly, and more basically, there is no reason why the Twins, being bird-hunters, should not have been involved in more than one bird-shooting episode. As a matter of fact, at least one pottery scene has Hun-Ahpu shooting a vulture. Therefore, rather than referring to the Vucub-Caquix tale, the shooting of the Principal Bird Deity may well represent a now lost bird-shooting episode of Twin mythology. It seems clear that if a generalized Vucub-Caquix theory is to stand the test, important questions still need to be answered.

== Literature ==
- Karen Bassie-Sweet, Maya Sacred Geography and the Creator Deities. Norman: University of Oklahoma Press 2008.
- Coe, Michael D. (1989). "The Hero Twins: Myth and Image". In Barbara Kerr; Justin Kerr (eds.). The Maya Vase Book: A Corpus of Rollout Photographs of Maya Vases, volume 1. Justin Kerr (illus.). New York: Kerr Associates. pp. 161–184. ISBN 0-9624208-0-8.
- Julia Guernsey, Ritual and Power in Stone. The Performance of Rulership in Mesoamerican Izapa Style Art. Austin: University of Texas Press 2006.
- Nicholas Hellmuth, Monsters and Men in Maya Art.
- Karl Taube, Aztec and Maya Myths.
- Dennis Tedlock (tr.), Popol Vuh. New York: Simon and Schuster 1996.
