= Maya maize god =

Maya deity

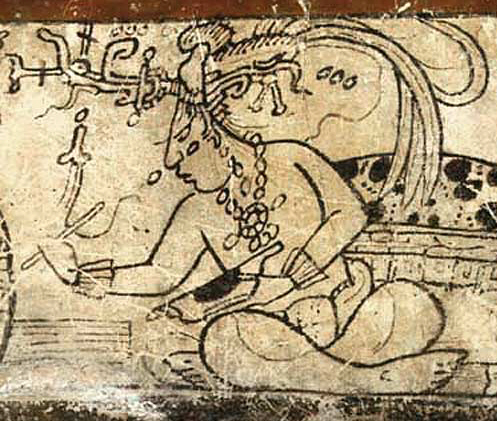
Fig. 1: Tonsured Maize God depiction as a patron of scribes; Mesoamerican Classic period.

Like other Mesoamerican peoples, the Maya peoples recognize in their staple crop, maize, a vital force with which they strongly identify. This is clearly shown by their mythological traditions. In the Mesoamerican Classic period (200–900), the Maize God shows aspects of a culture hero. According to the 16th-century Popol Vuh, the Hero Twins have maize plants as alter egos and humanity was created from maize. The discovery and opening of Maize Mountain, the place where the corn seeds were hidden, remains one of the most popular tales.

== Female and male deities ==
In Maya oral tradition, maize is usually personified as a woman like rice in Southeast Asia or wheat in ancient Greece and Rome. The acquisition of this woman through bride kidnapping constitutes one of the basic Maya myths.

In contrast, Maya aristocracy in the Pre-Columbian era conceived of maize as male. The Classic period distinguished two male forms and assigned them different hieroglyphic designations: a foliated (leafy) maize god and a tonsured one. The Foliated God is present in the so-called Maize Tree as in the Temple of the Foliated Cross, Palenque, its cobs shaped like the god's head. A male maize deity representing the foliated type, labelled "God E" by scholars, is present in the three extant Maya hieroglyphic books.

Whereas the Foliated God is a one-dimensional vegetation spirit, the Tonsured Maize God's functions are much more diverse. When performing ritually, the latter typically wears a netted jade skirt and a belt with a large spondylus shell covering the loins. On Maya stelae, it is a queen rather than a king who tends to represent the tonsured maize god. The queen thus appears as a maize goddess, in accordance with the Maya narrative traditions mentioned above.

== Late Preclassic and Classic Maya mythology ==
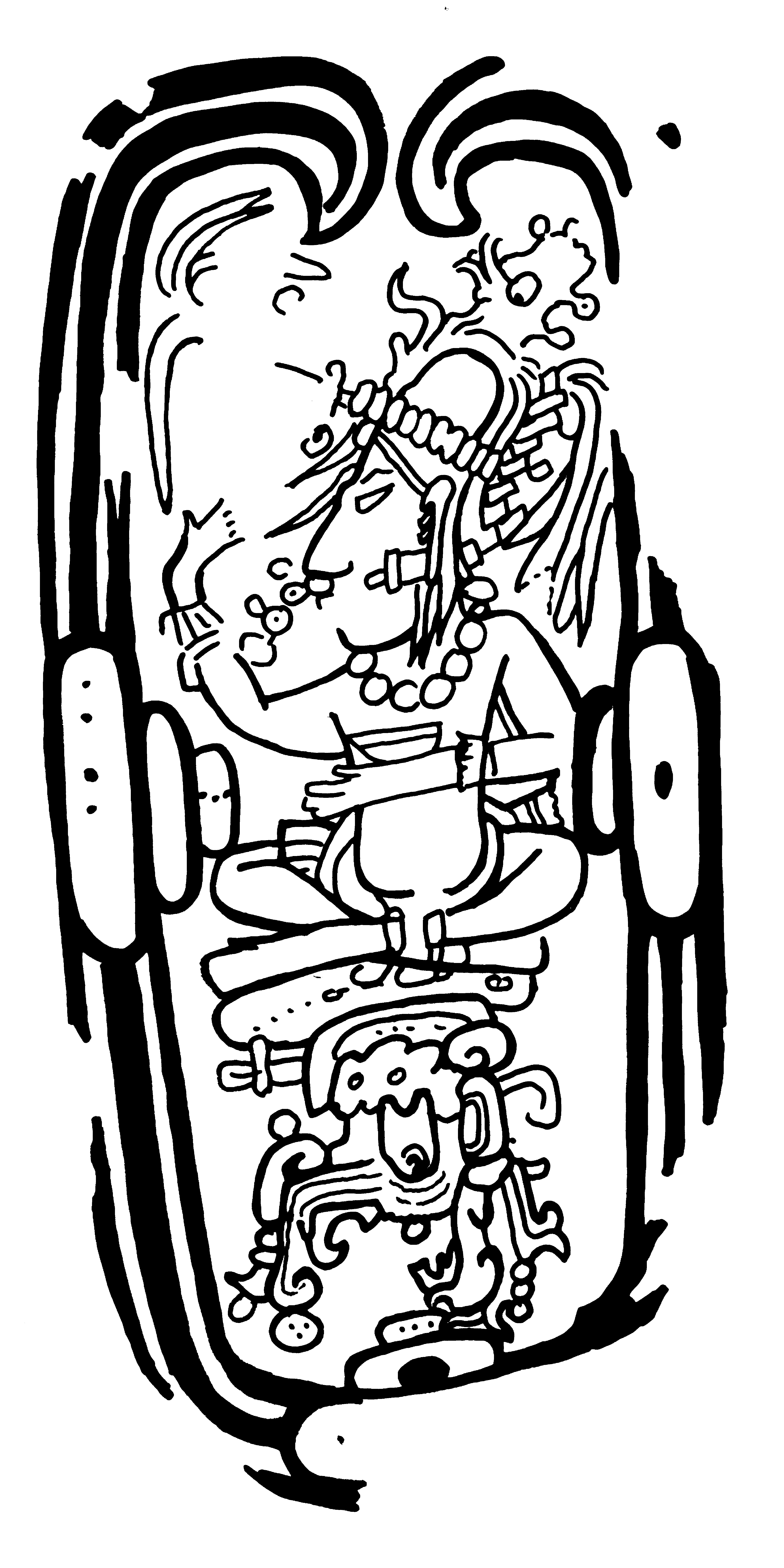
Fig. 3: San Francisco Capstone depicting the Tonsured Maize God residing in a well.

Many classic Maya paintings, particularly those on cacao drink vessels, testify to the existence of a rich mythology centered on the tonsured maize god. The late preclassic murals of San Bartolo demonstrate its great antiquity. Several theories, with varying degrees of ethnographic support, have been formulated to account for episodes such as the maize deity's resurrection from a turtle, his canoe voyage, and his transformation into a cacao tree.

=== Popol Vuh twin myth extension ===
The tonsured maize god is often accompanied by the Hero Twins. Following Karl Taube, many scholars such as Michael D. Coe believe that the resurrected Tonsured Maize God of the Classic period corresponds to the father of the hero twins in the Popol Vuh called Hun Hunahpu. However, this once generally accepted identification has also been contested.

=== Cosmological creation myth ===
Linda Schele's emphasis on creation has led to a series of interconnected hypotheses all involving the cosmological centrality of the tonsured maize god (or "first father"), to wit: his establishment of the so-called "three-stone hearth" (assumed to represent a constellation); his raising of the world tree; his "dance of creation"; and his stance as an acrobat, which (more or less coinciding with representations of a crocodile tree) seems to evoke the central world tree. The maize god's presence in the San Bartolo arrangement of five world trees has been interpreted as his establishment of the world.

=== Seasonal myth ===
Another theory, formulated by Simon Martin, focuses on the tonsured maize god's interaction with an aged jaguar deity of trade, God L. This interaction is related to the hero's transformation into a cacao tree conceived as a "trophy tree." God L is assumed to have presided over the dry season dedicated to long-distance trade, warfare, and the cacao harvest, and the Tonsured Maize God over the wet season and the growth of the maize. The onset of the two seasons is thought to be symbolized by the defeat of the maize deity and of God L, respectively.

=== Gulf Coast maize myth ===
In many scenes, an aquatic environment strongly comes to the fore (see fig. 2), most famously in the maize deity's resurrection from the carapace of a turtle that is floating on the waters. Braakhuis pointed out that such an environment also characterizes an important maize myth shared by many ethnic groups (such as Huaxtecs, Totonacs, Nahuas and Zoques) inhabiting Mexico's Gulf Coast. The fact that this myth focuses on a male, rather than a female maize deity, while at the same time establishing an intimate connection between the maize god and the turtle, is adduced in support of the idea that the Classic Maya once formed part of the same narrative tradition. More in particular, the Pre-Classic San Bartolo Maya maize deity dancing with a turtle drum amidst aquatic deities may have a connection with a Zoque (Popoluca) version of the Gulf Coast maize myth.

== Names and calendar functions ==
Several designations for the pre-Spanish maize god occur in the Chilam Balam of Chumayel. They include Ah mun "tender green shoot" and Zac uac nal "white six new corn" or Uac chuaac nal "six tall new corn". In the wake of Schele, the Tonsured God (hypothetically equated with Hun Hunahpu) has often been nicknamed "first father." The classic name of the Tonsured God, which usually includes the numeral "One", is not known with certainty. Schele's "Hun-Nal-Ye" used to be popular; more recently, "Ixim" "maize grains" and "Nal" "wet ear of corn" are being considered.

In a general sense, maize relates to the day Qʼan (ripe or ripeness). The appearance of the tonsured maize god is connected to the base date of the Long Count, 4 Ahau 8 Cumku. The head of the tonsured maize god serves to denote the number 1, that of the foliated maize god the number 8. The tonsured maize god is sometimes found associated with the lunar crescent and may therefore have played a role in the divisions of the lunar count; his head seems to occur in glyph C of the Lunar Series (see also Maya moon goddess).

== See also ==
- Centeōtl (Aztec god of maize)
- Chicomecōātl (Aztec goddess of maize)
- Xōchipilli (Aztec god of flowers, maize, and the arts)
