= Howler monkey gods =

Patron of the artisans among the Classic Mayas

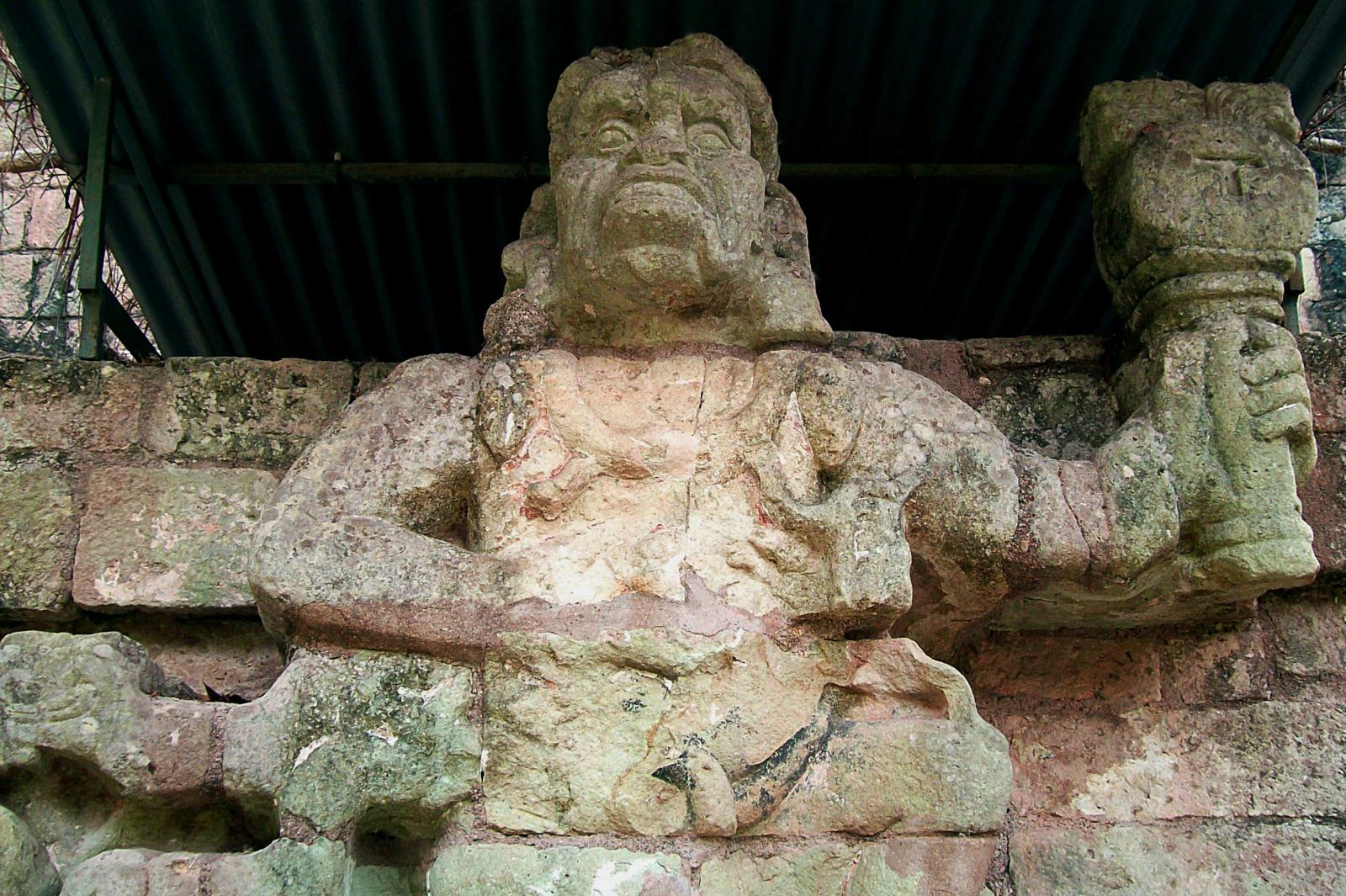
Possible howler monkey statue, temple 11, Copan

Among the Classic Maya, the howler monkey god was a major deity of the arts—including music—and a patron of the artisans, especially of the scribes and sculptors. As such, his sphere of influence overlapped with that of the Tonsured Maize God. The monkey patrons—there are often two of them—have been depicted on classical vases in the act of writing books (while stereotypically holding an ink nap) and carving human heads. Together, these two activities may have constituted a metaphor for the creation of mankind, with the book containing the birth signs and the head the life principle or 'soul', an interpretation reinforced by the craftsman titles of the creator gods in the Popol Vuh.

Based on its facial features, the stone sculpture of a seated writer found within the House of the Scribes in Copan is often described as a howler monkey. However, it is the two large statues of simian figures shaking rattles (see fig.), found on both sides of the 'Reviewing Stand' of Copan's temple 11, that approach much more closely the standard representation of this animal in Maya art and in Long Count inscriptions (including the snakes in the corners of the mouth). Variously described as wind gods and as 'were-monkeys' and ritual clowns, these statues may actually represent howler monkeys in their quality of musicians. A ceramic incense burner modeled like a howler monkey scribe has been found at post-classic Mayapan.

At the time of the Spanish invasion, the howler monkeys continued to be venerated, although the role they played in mythological narratives diverged. Bartolomé de las Casas stated that in the Alta Verapaz, Hun-Ahan (probably 'One-Woodcarver') and Hun-Cheven (Hun-Chowen in the Popol Vuh) were counted among the thirteen sons of the upper god, and were celebrated as cosmogonic creator deities. Among the Quiché Mayas, they were less positively valued: according to the Popol Vuh, Hun-Chowen and Hun-Batz 'One-Howler Monkey' (both artists and musicians) clashed with their half-brothers, the Maya Hero Twins, a conflict which led to their humiliating transformation into monkeys.

In the mantic calendar, howler monkey (Batz), corresponding to spider monkey (Ozomatli) in the Aztec system, denotes the 11th day, which is associated with the arts. In the Long Count (see Maya calendar), the Howler Monkey can personify the day-unit, which connects him to the priestly arts of calendrical reckoning and divination, as well as to ritualistic and historical knowledge.

== In popular culture ==
Hun Batz is featured in the videogames Smite and Smite 2 as a playable Maya god.

== Sources ==
- Braakhuis, H.E.M. (1987). "Artificers of the Days. Functions of the Howler Monkey Gods among the Mayas". Bijdragen tot de Taal-, Land- en Volkenkunde 143-1 (1987): 25-53.
- Coe, Michael (1977). "Supernatural Patrons of Maya Scribes and Artists". In N. Hammond (ed.). Social Process in Maya Prehistory. Princeton, New Jersey: Princeton University Press. pp. 327–347.
- Coe, Michael; Justin Kerr (1997). The Art of the Maya Scribe. London: Thames and Hudson.
- Inomata, Takeshi (2001). "The Power and Ideology of Artistic Creation". Current Anthropology. 42 (3): 321–349. doi:10.1086/320475. S2CID 149902302.
- Milbrath, Susan; Peraza, Carlos (2003). "Mayapan's Scribe: A Link with Classic Maya Artists". Mexicon. XXV: 120–123.
- Reents-Budet, Doreen (1998). "Elite Maya Pottery and Artisans as Social Indicators". Archeological Papers of the American Anthropological Association. 8–1: 71–89. doi:10.1525/ap3a.1998.8.1.71.
- Taube, K. (1989). "Ritual humor in classic Maya religion". In W. Hanks; D. Rice (eds.). Word and image in Maya culture: explorations in language, writing, and culture. Salt Lake City: University of Utah Press. pp. 351–382.
