= Raúl Aguilar Batres =

Guatemalan civil engineer

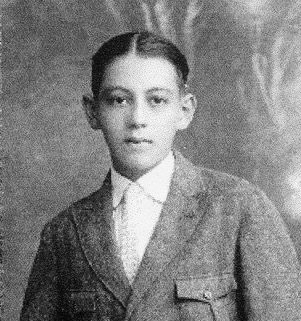

Raúl Aguilar Batres (December 1, 1910 – May 13, 1964) was a Guatemalan civil engineer. He is the inventor of the street naming and house numbering conventions that are used in Guatemala City and other cities in Guatemala.

== Biography ==
Aguilar Batres was born December 1, 1910, in Guatemala City. He graduated from the Universidad Nacional in 1939 with a degree in civil engineering. He served as a university professor, as an assistant engineer on the Joint Commission on the boundary with Mexico, and in the Guatemala City Department of Planning. Aguilar Batres devised a system to rename and number the streets of Guatemala City, dividing the city into 25 zones. North-south streets were numbered as Avenidas and east-west streets as Calles. Hyphenated numbers were assigned to addresses to indicate distance in meters from a specified cross street. The system was introduced in 1947 and subsequently adopted by other cities such as Quetzaltenango. Aguilar Batres died May 13, 1964.

=== Legacy ===
Calle de Amatitlán in Guatemala was renamed Calzada Raúl Aguilar Batres within a few years of Aguilar Batres' death. A monument, featuring a marble bust sculpted by Rodolfo Galeotti Torres was created in 1970 and placed on Calzada Aguilar Batres in zone 11 of Guatemala City.

== See also ==
- Marco Antonio Cuevas
