= Inter-American School, Quetzaltenango, Guatemala =

Coordinates: 14.8460°N 91.5036°W

Inter-American School in Quetzaltenango, Guatemala, was founded in 1961 as a Christian school for the children of missionaries serving in Guatemala. Since then, the school has also served the children of many local families. The school runs on an American-style schedule (August to May) and uses the California state standards to assess and document student learning.

The faculty come from English speaking countries, many from the United States, and speak English as their first language. Most serve for two to three years before returning to the US to continue their careers or to travel to serve in other countries.

Inter-American School partners with World Outreach Ministries and is a candidacy school with AdvancEd (formerly SACS CASI). It is a member of the Inter-American Foreign Evangenical Missionaries Cultural Association (IAFEMCA).
