= Alejandra Teleguario Santizo =

Guatemalan activist

Alejandra Teleguario Santizo (born around 2001 in Quetzaltenango, Guatemala) is a Guatemalan feminist and activist for women's and children's rights and sexual and reproductive rights.

== Life ==
Born around 2001 in Quetzaltenango, Alejandra Teleguario Santizo is the daughter of Oswaldo Teleguario and Lilian Santizo. In 2014, at 13 years of age, she was voted to become the mayor of the Council for Children and Adolescents of Quetzaltenango.

Teleguario Santizo has campaigned for women's rights in Guatemala since she was sixteen years old. Her activism has specifically focused on sexual violence and street harassment in Guatemalan communities. She became a recurrent guest on radio programmes across the country, and joined a network of girl leaders, in a campaign against child marriage. She is a YouthLead Ambassador, and pioneer within the Niñas Ayudando Niñas project ("girls supporting girls"). She founded the National, Departmental and Municipal Network Las Niñas Lideran (Girls Up), working for girls and teenage mothers in the country. Due to her activism, she became a fellow of the Embassy of the United States in Guatemala. She was named a distinguished citizen of Quetzaltenango, and has presented her initiatives in the Congress of the Republic of Guatemala. In 2018, she met with Michelle Obama to talk about women's rights and possibilities.

Teleguario Santizo has a teacher's diploma.
