= Centro Médico =

Centro Médico may refer to:

- Centro Médico Nacional Siglo XXI, a hospital in Mexico City
  - Centro Médico metro station (Mexico City), a metro station servicing the hospital
  - Centro Médico (Mexico City Metrobús), a BRT station servicing the hospital
- Centro Médico station (Puerto Rico), in San Juan
- Centro Médico (Guatemala), a hospital in Guatemala City
- Centro Médico Excel, a skyscraper in Tijuana, Mexico
- Centro Médico Episcopal San Lucas, a hospital in Ponce, Puerto Rico

== See also ==
- Medical Center (disambiguation)
