= Jesús Castillo =

Jesús Castillo may refer to:

- Chucho Castillo (1944–2013), Mexican world champion boxer
- Jesús Castillo (composer) (1877–1946), Guatemalan composer
- Jesús Castillo (Mexican footballer) (born 1988), Mexican footballer
- Jesús Castillo (Peruvian footballer) (born 2001), Peruvian footballer
- Jesús Castillo Jr. (born 1960), Puerto Rican wrestler
