= Ricardo Castillo =

Ricardo Castillo may refer to:

- Ricardo Castillo (boxer) (b. 1979), Mexican boxer
- Ricardo Castillo (composer) (1891–1966), Guatemalan composer
