= Quetzaltenango Municipal Theatre =

Coordinates: 14°50′16.76″N 91°31′07.92″W

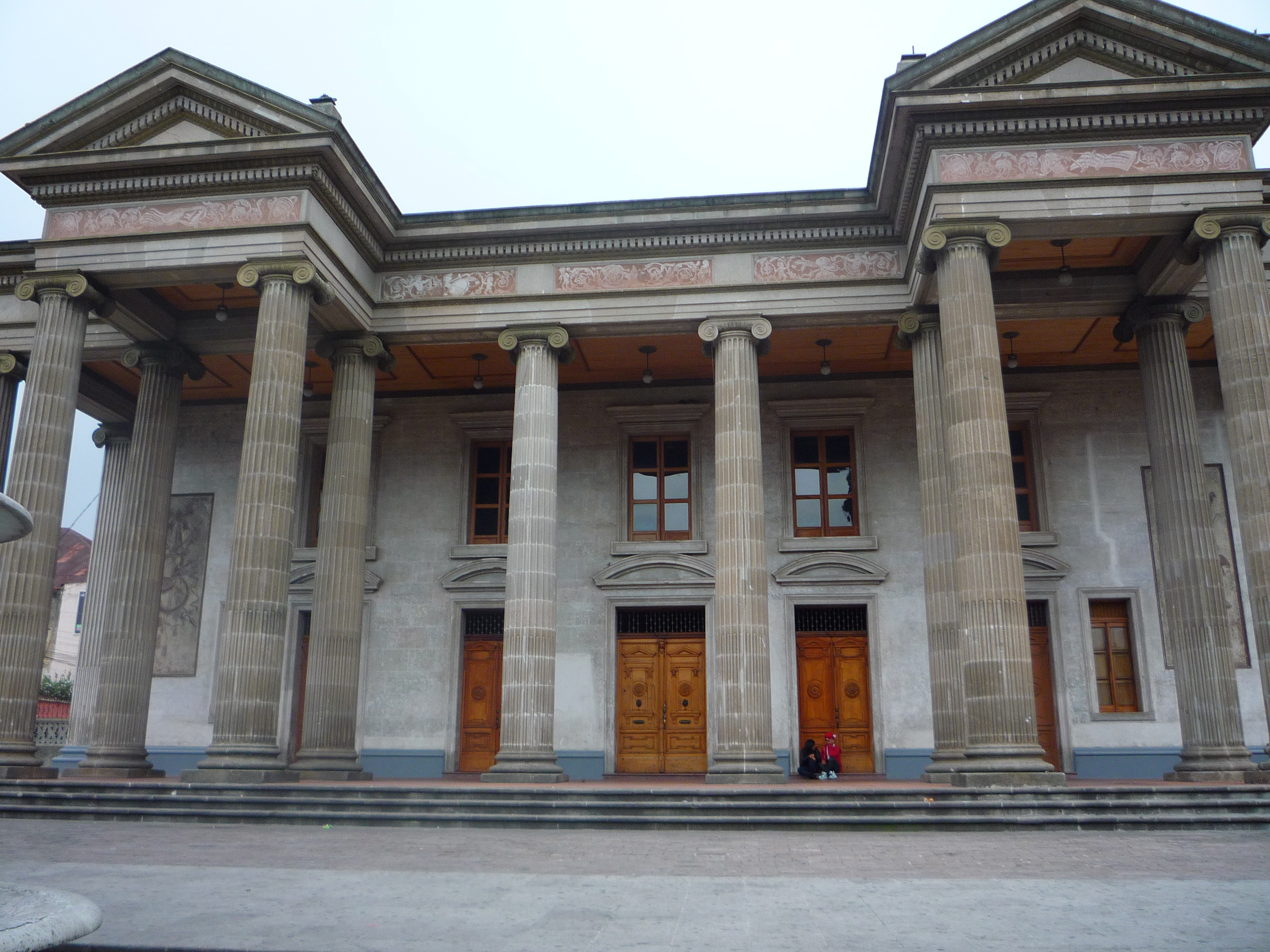
the theatre in 2013

The Quetzaltenango Municipal Theatre, known as the Teatro Municipal is a theatre in Quetzaltenango, Guatemala.

The historical building still hosts theatrical presentations and is also noted for its jazz performances which attract many visitors to the theatre.

It was inaugurated on 19 July 1895.
