= Lists of hospitals in North America =

The following are lists of hospitals in North America for each sovereign country. territory, and dependency:

== Sovereign states ==
The following list contains the links to lists of hospitals and the category hospitals in each sovereign state of North America, along with the current number of articles in each category.

- List of hospitals in the Bahamas (0)
- List of hospitals in Barbados (3)
- List of hospitals in Belize (4)
- List of hospitals in Canada (18)
- List of hospitals in Costa Rica (6)
- List of hospitals in Cuba (5)
- List of hospitals in Dominica (1)
- List of hospitals in the Dominican Republic (3)
- List of hospitals in El Salvador (3)
- List of hospitals in Grenada (0)
- List of hospitals in Guatemala (3)
- List of hospitals in Haiti (6)
- List of hospitals in Honduras (1)
- List of hospitals in Jamaica (9)
- List of hospitals in Mexico (13)
- List of hospitals in Nicaragua (0)
- List of hospitals in Panama (7)
- List of hospitals in Saint Kitts and Nevis
- List of hospitals in Saint Lucia (1)
- List of hospitals in Saint Vincent and the Grenadines (0)
- List of hospitals in Trinidad and Tobago (3)
  - Cauro Hospital, St. Augustine
  - Arima General Hospital, Arima
  - Eric Williams Medical Sciences Complex, Champ Fleurs
  - Mt.hope General Hospital (Women's Hospital), Champ Fleurs
  - Point Fortin Area Hospital, Point Fortin
  - Port of Spain General Hospital, Port of Spain
  - Roxborough Hospital, Roxborough
  - San Fernando General Hospital, San Fernando
  - Sangre Grande General Hospital, Sangre Grande
  - Scarborough General Hospital, Tobago
  - Saint Anne's Hospital (Mental), Saint Anne's
- Lists of hospitals in the United States (78)

== Territories and dependencies ==
The following lists shows the country, list or number of hospitals, and number of hospitals in the country category:

- Anguilla has one hospital, the Princess Alexandra Hospital, Anguilla (1)
- Aruba has one hospital, the Dr. Horacio E. Oduber Hospital. (1)
- Bermuda, List of hospitals in Bermuda (0)
- Bonaire has one hospital, the Hospital San Francisco. (0)
- British Virgin Islands (0)
- Cayman Islands, List of hospitals in the Cayman Islands (0)
- Curaçao has one hospital, the Curaçao Medical Center. (2)
- Greenland List of hospitals in Greenland (1)
- Guadeloupe (0)
- Martinique (0)
- Montserrat has one small hospital (Glendon Hospital), however specialised health care has to be performed in Antigua or Guadeloupe. (0)
- Puerto Rico List of hospitals in Puerto Rico (5)
- Saba has one small health center (A.M. Edwards Medical Center), however specialised health care has to be performed in Sint Maarten Medical Center. (0)
- Saint Barthélemy has one small hospital (Hôpital de Bruyn), however specialised health care has to be performed in Guadeloupe. (0)
- Saint Martin has one hospital, the Louis-Constant Fleming Hospital. (0)
- Saint Pierre and Miquelon has one small hospital (Centre Hospitalier François Dunan), however specialised health care has to be performed in St. John's, Newfoundland and Labrador. (0)
- Sint Eustatius has one small hospital (Queen Beatrix Medical Center), however specialised health care has to be performed in Sint Maarten Medical Center. (0)
- Sint Maarten has one hospital, the Sint Maarten Medical Center. (0)
- Turks and Caicos Islands: There are two hospitals in Turks and Caicos Islands. (0)
  - National Hospital Grand Turk, Grand Turk, 10 beds.
  - National Hospital Providenciales, Providenciales, 20 beds.
- United States Virgin Islands: There are two hospitals in the U.S. Virgin Islands (0)
  - Gov. Juan F. Luis Hospital Medical Center, Christiansted, 77 beds
  - Roy Lester Schneider Hospital, Saint Thomas, 107 beds

== See also ==
- Lists of hospitals in Africa
- Lists of hospitals in Asia
- Lists of hospitals in Europe
- Lists of hospitals in Oceania
- Lists of hospitals in South America
