= Dr. Horacio E. Oduber Hospital =

Horacio Oduber Hospital
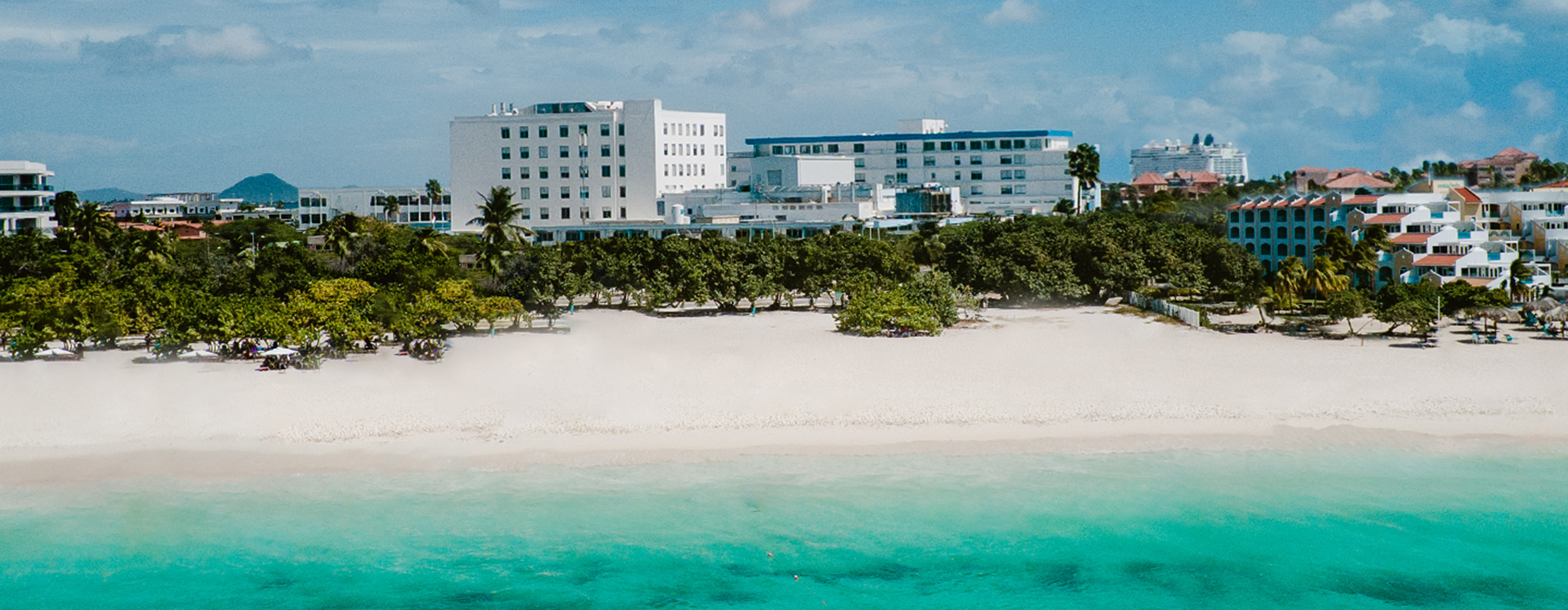
- Horacio Oduber Hospital (2023)

Geography
- Location: Eagle Beach in Oranjestad, Aruba
- Coordinates: 12.5420°N 70.0577°W

Services
- Beds: 187

History
- Opened: 1976

Links
- Website: ArubaHospital.com
- Lists: Hospitals in Aruba

Horacio Oduber Hospital (HOH) is a medium-sized general hospital in Aruba.

The hospital building is located northwest of the capital city of Oranjestad where the Arend Petroleum Company at Eagle was formerly located. Named after physician Horacio Oduber, the 187-bed hospital was put into use in late 1976. On March 5, 1977, the official opening took place in the presence of Dutch minister De Gaay Fortman. In September 2014, the start of the hospital's expansion and renovation project began, one of the largest construction projects in Aruban history. Including a new bed house, a three times larger emergency room, a new outpatient clinic for specialists and the remodeling of the building. The final phase of this project will resume at the end of the year 2023 after a dispute by parties caused construction to be halted in 2022.

The Horacio Oduber Hospital is part of the Dutch Caribbean Hospital Alliance (DCHA) together with other hospitals in the Caribbean that are part of the Kingdom of the Netherlands. Alliances and collaborations include the country laboratory of Curaçao (ADC), Streeklab Haarlem, the University Medical Center Utrecht (UMCU), Erasmus Medical Center (EMC), Radboud University, the Vrije Universiteit Amsterdam (VU), Maastricht University, Xavier University, Thomas Moore in Belgium and partner hospitals in Colombia. Currently, the board members are Drs. Jacco Vroegop (chairman) and Gregory Croeze, MBA (CFO).

== History ==
Horacio Eulogio Oduber (1862-1935) was the first Aruban physician and had a home practice in Wilhelminastraat. The doctor was often paid only in kind or given fodder for his horse. Many people died from infections, viruses or diseases not known at that time. According to estimates, about 8,000 people lived on the island in 1910. They were mostly farm workers with few financial resources. Since there was no hospital at that time, doctors took patients into their homes, and necessary operations, including amputations, were performed only by administering lots of rum due to the lack of anesthetics.

At the turn of the century, the population increased rapidly and Horacio Oduber's infirmary also became too small. To alleviate the need, hospices arose, including at Madiki and on Oude Schoolstraat, and a small military hospital was established at Fort Zoutman.

In 1904, a committee began to raise money for the establishment of a hospital on Aruba. With the help of regional and local actions, the capital needed for this was raised by the Diocese of Willemstad. On the initiative of Bishop Vuylsteke, the country house of plantation Sividivi, near Oranjestad, was purchased and, after temporary use as a nunnery, was converted into a hospital. The actual first Aruban hospital, San Pedro de Verona, was opened in 1920 by the Dominican Sisters. Expansion of facilities to 200 beds and renovations in 1927, 1936 and 1953 followed, but always proved inadequate for the growing population. In 1971, thanks to funding from the Netherlands, construction of a new hospital began. Since 1977, the former hospital complex has been used as a nursing home.

After two oil refineries settled in Aruba in the 1920s, they proceeded to set up their own health care. Arend Petroleum company doctor, Adriaan Dussenbroek (1893-1965), had a small practice in Quinta del Carmen, his private residence in Bubali. In 1929, a small hospital was set up for company personnel behind his home, which was in use until 1943. Between 1929 and 1972, the Lago oil refinery at Seroe Colorado operated a second 120-bed general hospital, which catered to its own employees and their family members, seamen from oil tankers and privately insured citizens. When the oil refineries closed, the hospital complexes were completely demolished; for Eagle in 1953 and Lago in 1985.

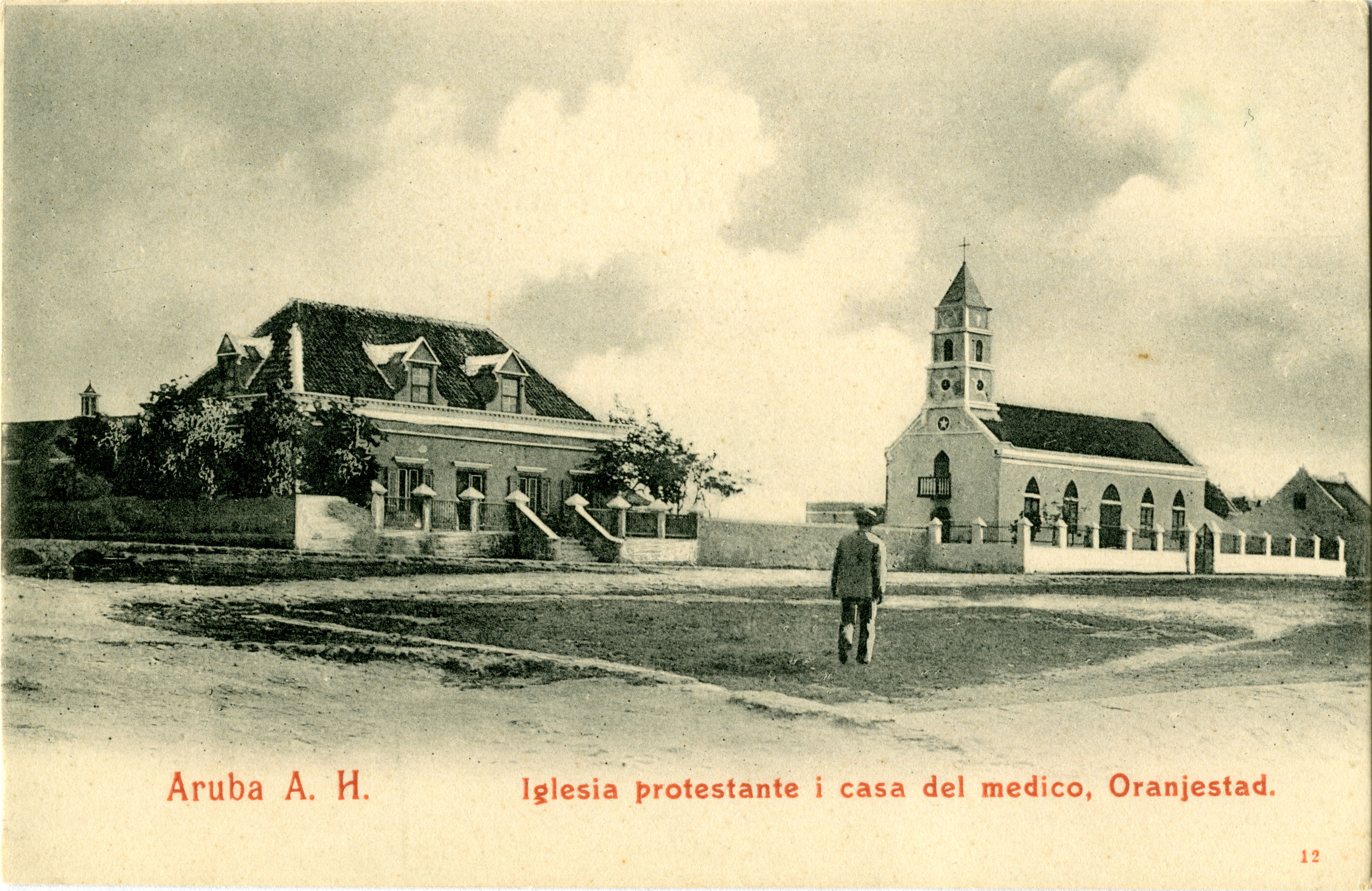
Doctor's home of Horacio Oduber on Wilhelminastraat opposite the Protestant church (1907)

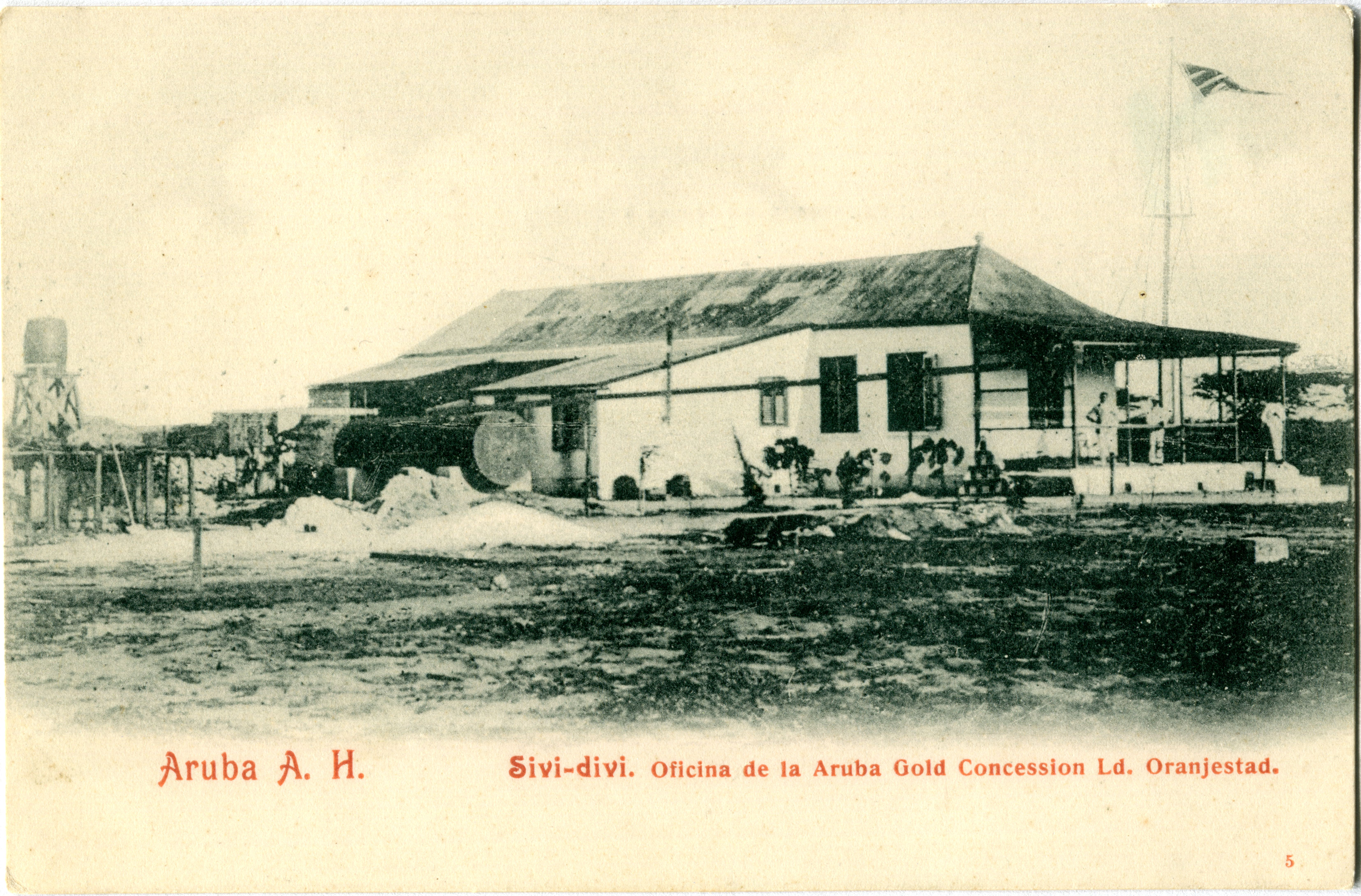
Country house Sividivi, equipped with a large cistern with pressure pump and its own water pipe, was converted into a hospital

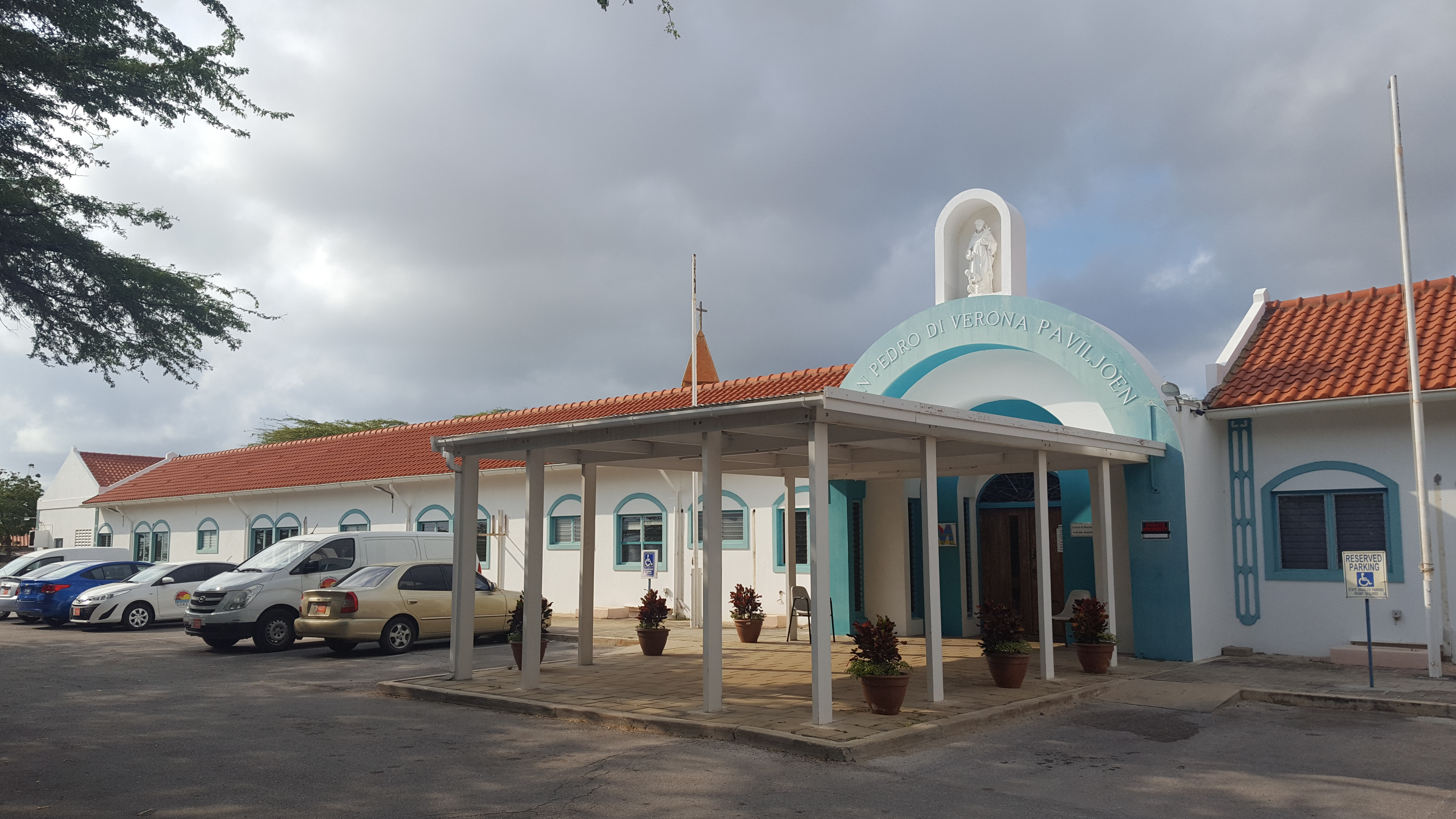
Entrance to San Pedro de Verona

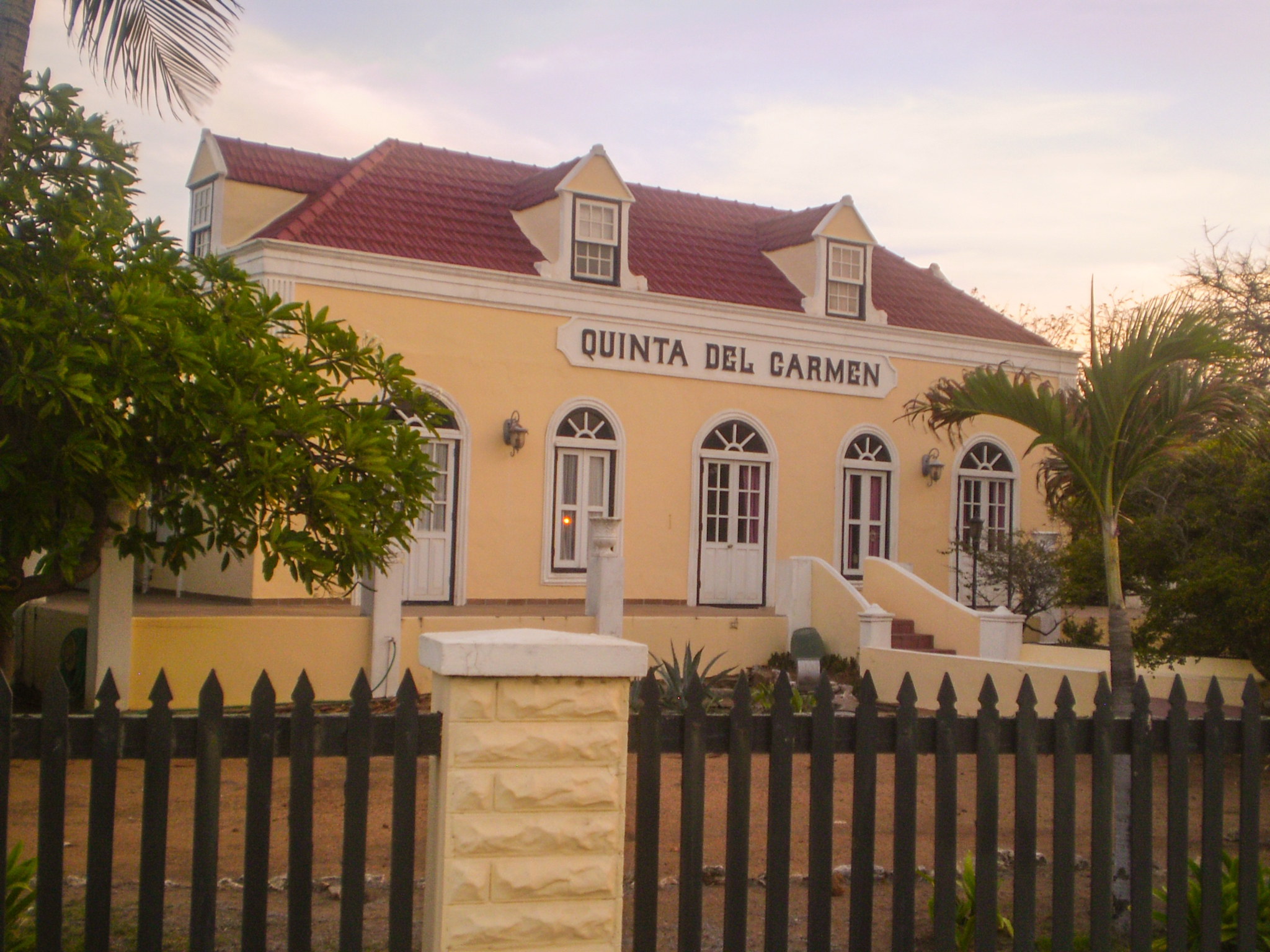
Former doctor's residence Quinta del Carmen

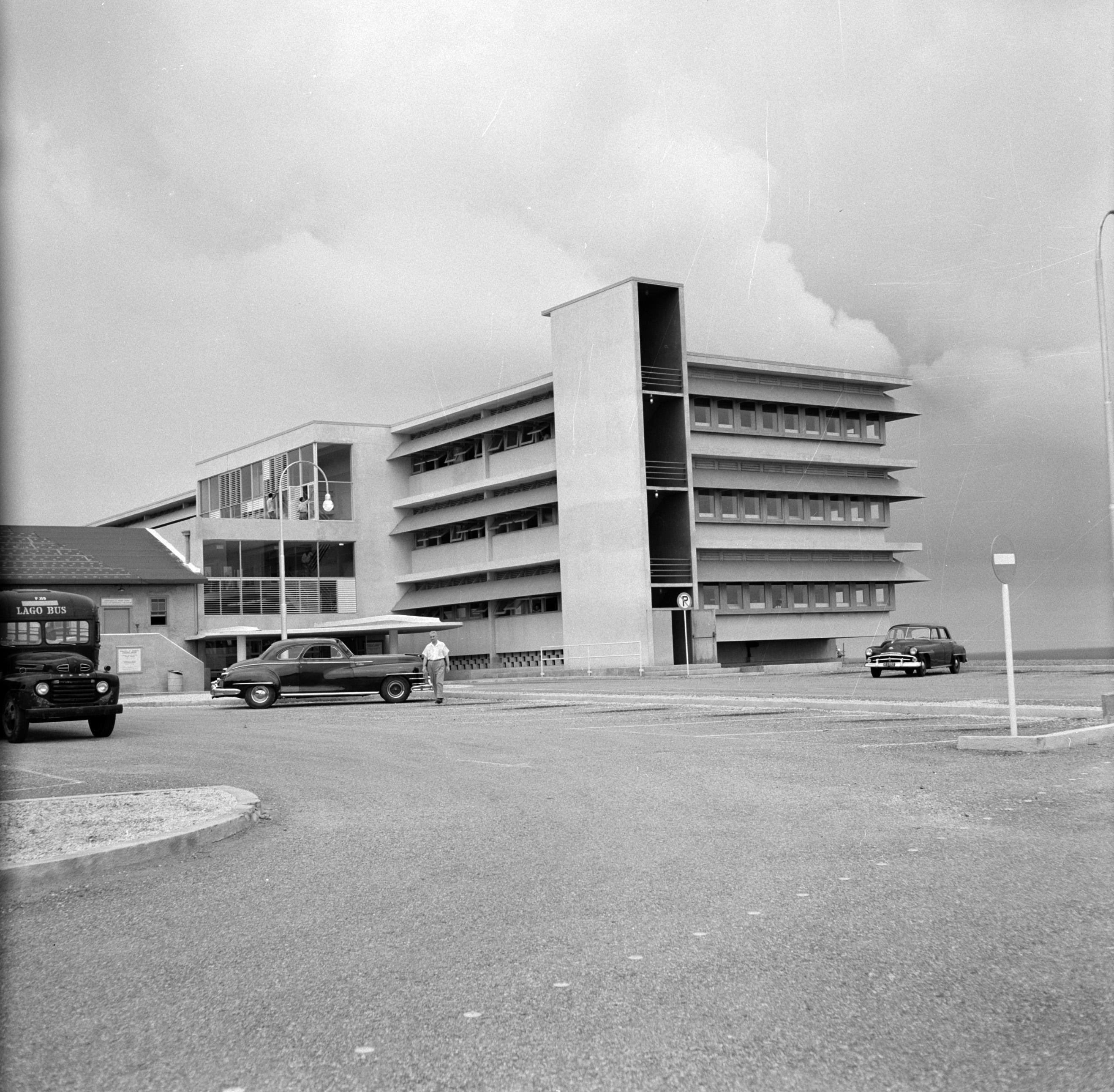
Entrance to Lago hospital

== Healthcare and departments ==
Horacio Oduber Hospital currently (2023) has a capacity of 248 beds. In 2020, during the corona crisis, the number of beds in the intensive care unit was scaled up from 8 to 33. Of these, 12 beds were donated by the Netherlands. Reliant on hospital care are the approximately 120,000 residents of Aruba, patients sent from neighboring islands, the 25,000 undocumented people living on the island and the 15,000 tourists who stay on the island on average each day. Over 10,000 patients were admitted in 2017 and the emergency room sees between 35,000 and 40,000 patients annually. An average of 900 referrals for specialty care take place annually from the Caribbean Netherlands. Management of the hospital is in the hands of the Stichting Ziekenverpleging Aruba (SZA), which leases the complex from the Stichting Onroerend Goed Aruba (SOGA).

A major expansion and renovation project was launched in 2014, consisting of expanding the hospital with two new towers and renovating and modernizing the existing buildings. The new 3-story medical-administrative center was completed in 2016, and in 2017 the new 6-story bed tower with a pediatric ward, an emergency room and a maternity & obstetrics department was completed.

The hospital has more than 20 different specialties and about 1,300 employees. Specialty physicians are contracted by the HOH or work independently (privately and independently). The staff is very diverse, consisting of people from Aruba and the Caribbean region as well as from European and South American countries. The diversity makes it so that work is performed besides the main language Dutch, in a multilingual environment such as the local language Papiamento but also Spanish and English. This is also useful for tourism, the island’s main economic pillar.

Departments

Medical disciplines offered at HOH are: general medicine, surgery, internal medicine, neurology, neurosurgery, orthopedics, pediatrics, gynecology, cardiology, nephrology, gastroenterology, anesthesia, ophthalmology, ENT, oncology, pathology, intensive care (IZ), plastic surgery, dermatology, obstetrics, pulmonology, radiology, rehabilitation, rheumatology, emergency medicine and urology.

Diagnostics

Electrophysiology, ultrasound, X-ray, mammography, CT and MRI scans, performance testing, laparoscopy, endoscopy, bronchoscopy, coronary angiography, pathology, serology, clinical chemistry, microbiology, among others. The Landslaboratorium Aruba used to perform diagnostics as a government agency after which it became its own foundation called Fundacion Servicio Laboratorio Medico Aruba (FSLMA), which was better known as LABHOH. This foundation was overseen by the same board of directors as the Horacio Oduber Hospital. Since April 2023, a legal merger has taken place and this foundation was dissolved and the departments of microbiology, pathology, clinical chemistry & hematology and pre-analysis fall directly as departments under the Horacio Oduber Hospital.

Medical institutions

Pediatric ward, physical therapy and rehabilitation center, obstetrics department, emergency room, ambulance, wound care center, diabetes center, pain clinic, daily oncology department, operating room complex with 6 ORs and the blood bank.

== Location and accessibility ==
HOH is located 2 km northwest of Oranjestad and near Eagle Beach, across from the low-rise hotel area and 5 km from the high-rise hotels at Palm Beach.

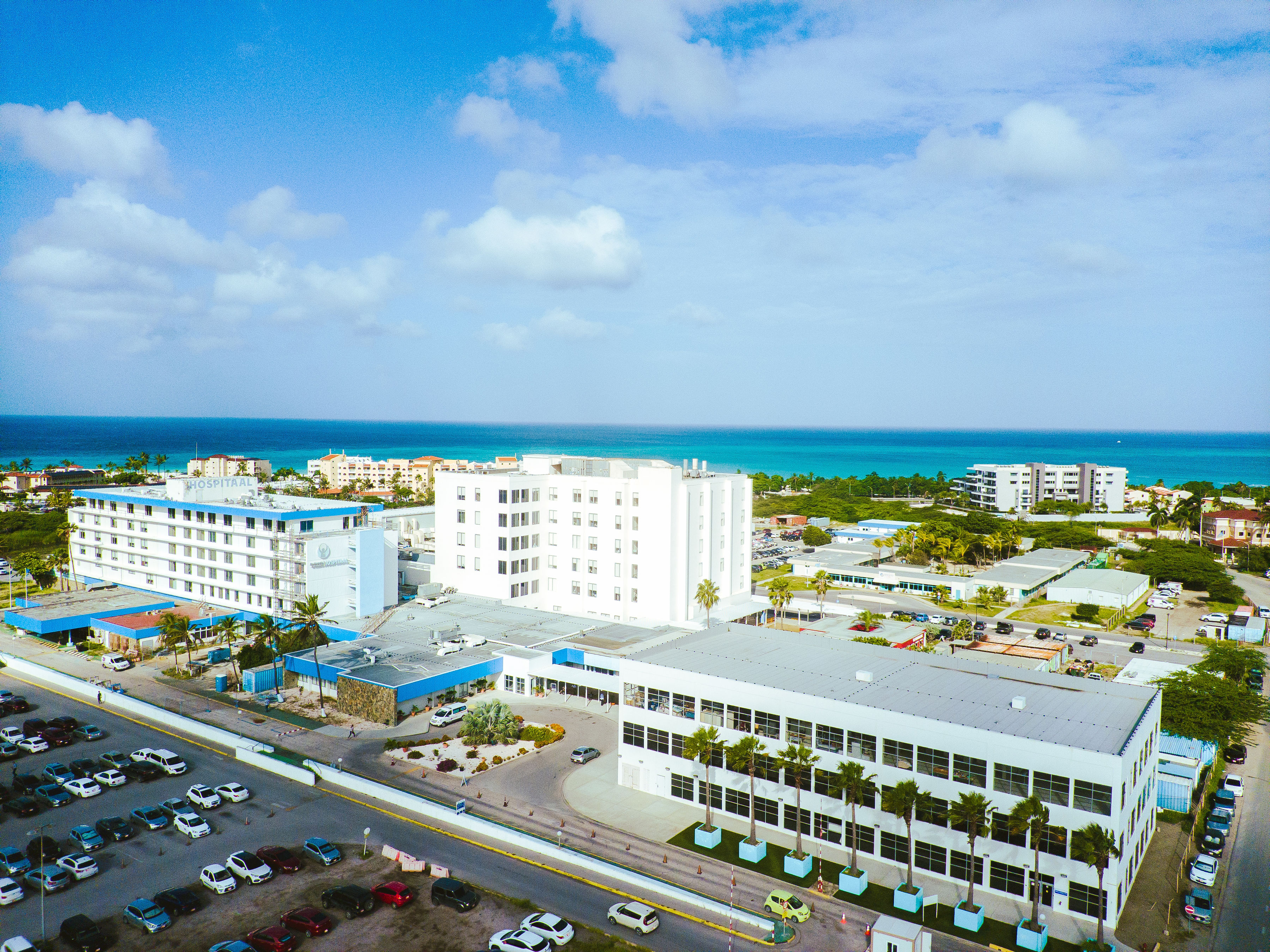
Horacio Oduber Hospital Aruba
