= San Fernando General Hospital =

- SWRHA
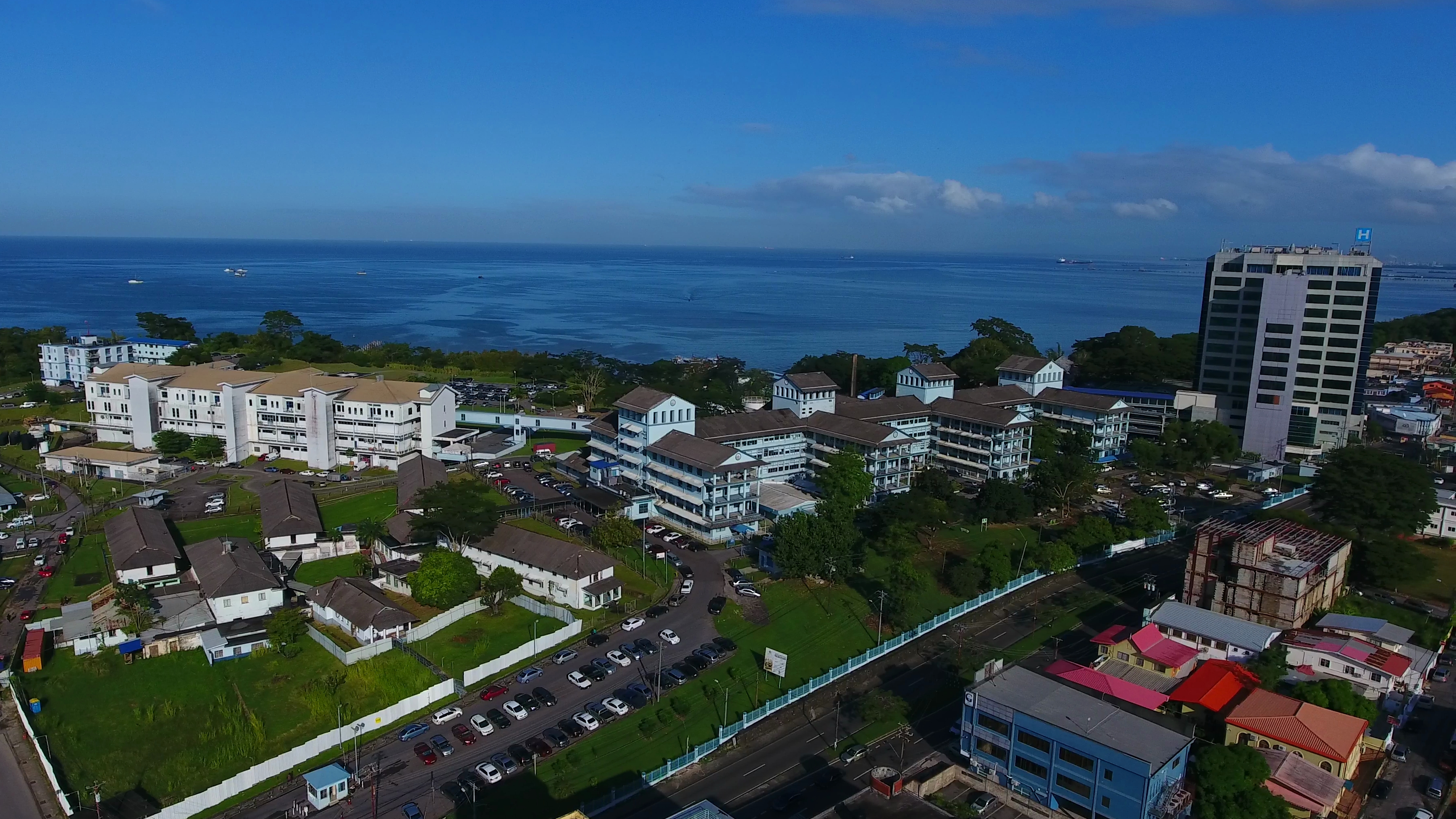

Geography
- Location: Independence Avenue, City of San Fernando, Trinidad, Trinidad and Tobago
- Coordinates: 10.280725°N 61.467105°W

Organisation
- Care system: South West Regional Health Authority
- Type: General

Services
- Emergency department: Yes

Links
- Lists: Hospitals in Trinidad and Tobago

San Fernando General Hospital is located in the City of San Fernando, Trinidad and Tobago. It's considered as the main trauma unit for the Southern region of the Island of Trinidad.

This Institution falls under the South West Regional Health Authority (SWRHA).
