= Julio Serrano Echeverría =

Guatemalan writer, poet, and filmmaker

Julio Serrano Echeverría (born 1983 in Quetzaltenango, Guatemala) is a Guatemalan writer, poet, and filmmaker.

He is the founder of the publishing house Libros Mínimos, one of the first Guatemalan publishers in offering publications for free download. He was one of the initiators of the International Festival of Poetry of Quetzaltenango. Many of his poems, short stories, and literature articles have been published in Guatemalan magazines and newspapers, as well as in anthologies and print and online publications. He has been invited to take part in international poetry and literature festivals.

Echeverría, representing Libros Mínimos, is a member of Colectivo Cuatro Caminos. On August 5, 2010, the first screening of the documentary "Vidas Ambulantes" (Ambulant Lives) took place, produced and directed by Colectivo Cuatro Caminos.

== Writings ==
- Las Palabras y los Días (Editorial Cultura, 2006)
- Trans 2.0 Trans 2.0 (Libros Mínimos, 2009)
- Sin Casaca(Librovisor / Centro Cultural de España/Guatemala, 2008)
- Fridom no fir (Libros Mínimos, 2009)
- Cuento Macho (Libros Mínimos, 2009)]

== Other projects ==
- Colectivo Cuatro Caminos
- Cadalzo Chapín
- Libros Mínimos

== Sources ==
- About the Author and Las Palabras y los Días, First Book of Julio Serrano
- Interview with the Author about las Las Palabras y los Días in elPeriodico
- About the new Publishing Houses in Guatemala, also Libros Mínimos in the elPeriodico newspaper
- Sixth International Poetry Festival Ciudad de Granada, Spain
- International Poetry Festival in Granada, Nicaragua
