= Port of Spain General Hospital =

- NWRHA
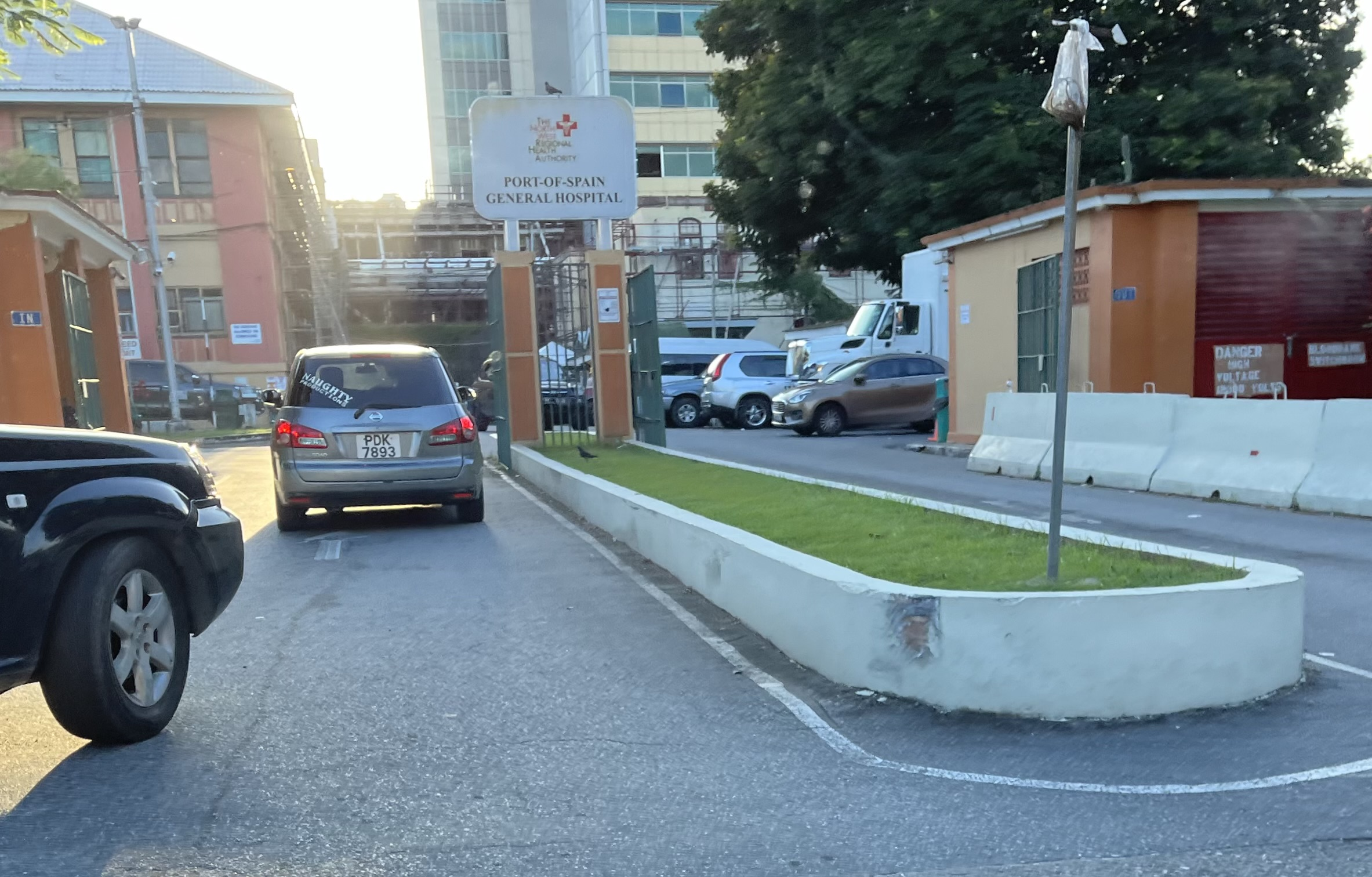
- Entrance

Geography
- Location: Upper Charlotte Street, Port of Spain, Trinidad and Tobago
- Coordinates: 10°39′43″N 61°30′31″W

Organisation
- Care system: North West Regional Health Authority
- Type: General

Services
- Emergency department: Yes
- Beds: 554

History
- Founded: 1858 (168 years ago)

Links
- Website: www.health.gov.tt/moh-healthfacilities/facility.aspx?id=19
- Lists: Hospitals in Trinidad and Tobago

Port of Spain General Hospital is a public hospital in Port of Spain, Trinidad and Tobago. The main building was once a Colonial hospital that began construction in 1854, using local stone and imported brick facing to provide a Classical style facade. The official opening of the hospital was in 1858. The exterior has been maintained while the interior has been adapted for modern medical practice, mostly in work around 1960 directed by the UK architects Devereux and Davies and including murals by the Trinidadian artist Althea McNish.

The hospital is located on Upper Charlotte Street in the city and serves as the main hospital for the North West Region of Trinidad, the most densely populated region in the island. Among its services are obstetric and gynecological care, outpatient medical care, surgical specialties such as orthopaedics and plastic surgery, therapeutic support and emergency care. It also serves as a teaching hospital to medical students from the University of the West Indies, St. Augustine campus.

This Institution falls under the North West Regional Health Authority (NWRHA).
