= Medical Center station =

Medical Center station may refer to:

- Baylor University Medical Center station, a light rail station in Dallas, Texas
- Illinois Medical District station, which was known as Medical Center prior to June 25, 2006
- LA General Medical Center station, a busway station in Boyle Heights, California
- Medical Center station (MARTA), a metro station in Sandy Springs, Georgia
- Medical Center station (Washington Metro), a rapid transit station in Bethesda, Maryland
- Medical/Market Center station, a commuter rail station in Dallas, Texas
- Tufts Medical Center station, a subway and bus rapid transit station in Boston, Massachusetts
- University Medical Center station, a light rail station in Salt Lake City, Utah
- Heath Street station, a station on the MBTA Green Line announced as "Heath Street/VA Medical Center" in Boston, Massachusetts, US
- VA Medical Center station (DART), a station on the DART light rail in Dallas, Texas, US
- VA Medical Center station (Metro Transit), a station on the METRO Blue Line in Minneapolis, Minnesota, US
- VA Medical Center station (San Diego), a station on the San Diego Trolley Blue Line in San Diego, California, US
- Westwood/VA Hospital station, a station under construction on the Los Angeles Metro Rail D Line in Los Angeles, California, US

== See also ==
- Medical Center (disambiguation)
