= Medical Center =

Medical center or medical centre may refer to:

== Medical care ==
- A collection of medical services on the same site, such as the services of a general practitioner, pharmacist, pathology, radiology, dentist, etc., either as part of a unified health system or separate offices within an office complex
- Clinic
- Hospital
- Academic medical centre, often including hospitals, research facilities, medical schools, and/or other health care facilities
- Centro Médico (disambiguation), multiple uses

== Transit ==
- Medical Center station (disambiguation), transit stations of the name

== Other ==
- Medical Center (TV series), a 1969–1976 medical drama series on CBS

== See also ==
- Illinois Medical District, a neighborhood in the Near West Side community area of Chicago, Illinois alternatively known as "Medical Center"
  - Illinois Medical District station, a station on the Chicago Transit Authority's Blue Line serving the above neighborhood; previously known as "Medical Center"
- Tufts Medical Center (MBTA station), a subway and BRT station in Boston commonly referred to as "Medical Center"
