= Universidad Mesoamericana =

Private university in Guatemala

Coordinates: 14°36′36″N 90°31′47″W

- Established: 1999
- Affiliations: Central American University Council of Private Higher Education
- Chancellor: Dr. Félix Javier Serrano Ursúa
- Students: 3000 (2009)
- Location: Guatemala City, Quetzaltenango, Guatemala
- Website: https://www.umes.edu.gt http://www.mesoamericana.edu.gt/

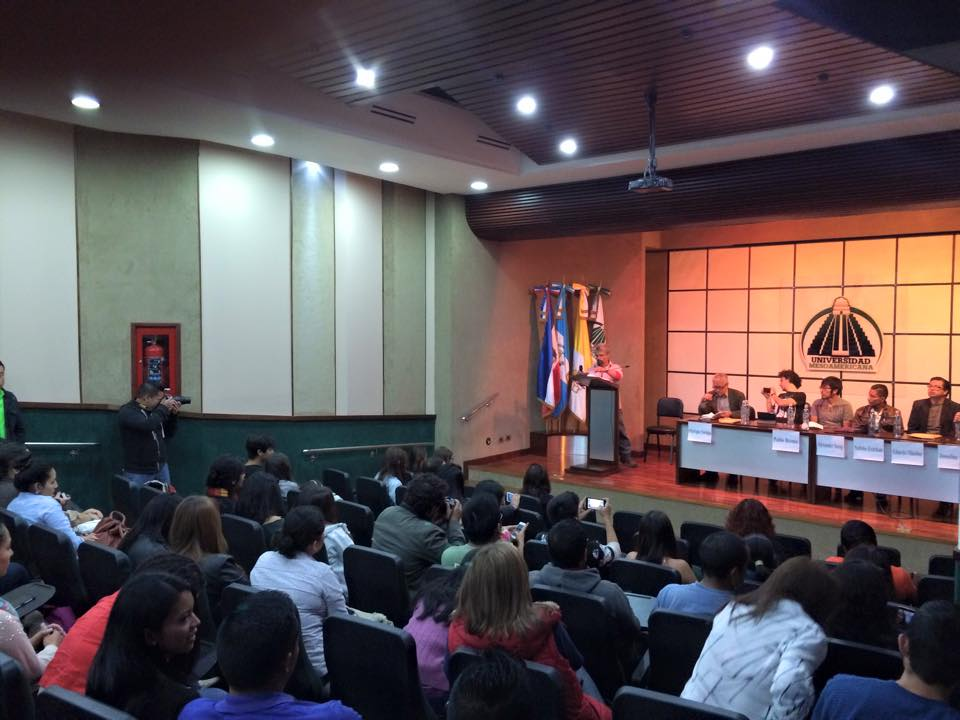
Poetry reading during the 11th International Poetry Festival in Quetzaltenango. Auditorium P. Dubón, Universidad Mesoamericana, campus Quetzaltenango.

Universidad Mesoamericana (in English, Mesoamerican University) is a private university in Guatemala. It has branches in Guatemala City and Quetzaltenango.

== History ==
In 1971, the Salesians of Don Bosco association signed an agreement of academic cooperation with the Francisco Marroquín University and since 1972 they developed humanities and educational programmes.

Drawing on the experience and academic development that had been made, the procedures which led to the foundation of the Universidad Mesoamericana started in 1996. It was approved by the Central American University Council of Private Higher Education in Guatemala on 1 October 1999.

In 2000, they developed the faculties of Humanities and Social Sciences. A year later, in partnership with the Association of Managers of Guatemala, they established the Escuela Superior de Alta Gerencia (ESAG), to provide expertise.

In 2002, another branch was established in Quetzaltenango as part of the Central American University which is the High School Senior Management headquarters. Courses began in Computer Engineering and Business Finance in 2008.

== Faculties ==
In 2006 there was a restructuring of faculties and they are now as follows:

- Faculty of Social Communication
- Faculty of Humanities and Social Sciences
- Faculty of Medicine
- Faculty of Economics
- Faculty of Engineering
- Faculty of Law
- Faculty of Architecture
