= Marco Antonio Cuevas =

Marco Antonio Cuevas Cruz
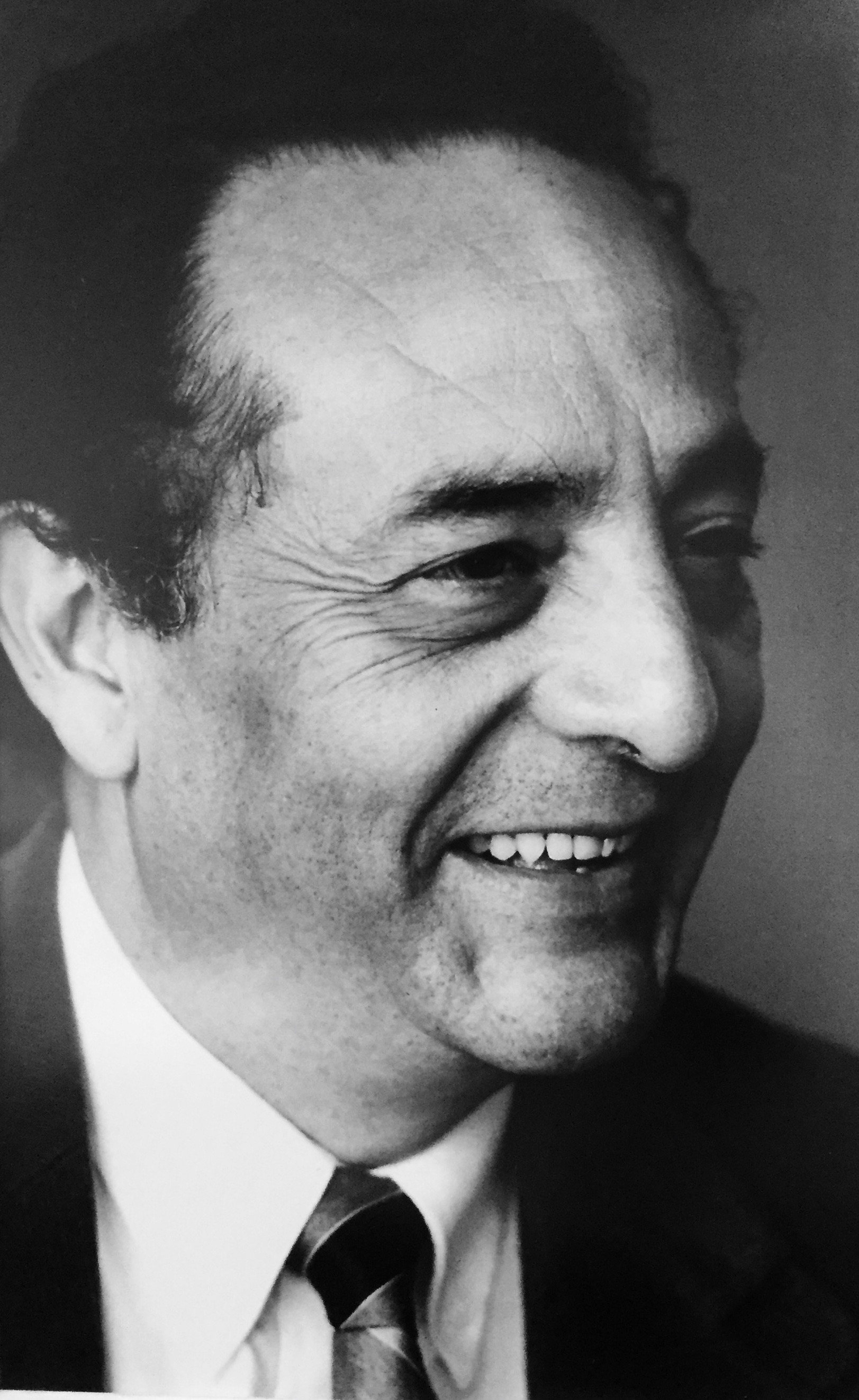
- Born: 18 November 1933; Guatemala City, Guatemala
- Died: 2 February 2009 (aged 75)
- Spouse: Evangelina Juarez Arevalo
- Children: Marco Antonio, Maria Isabel and Rodrigo
- Engineering career
- Discipline: Civil Engineer and Urban Planner

Marco Antonio Cuevas Cruz (November 18, 1933 – February 2, 2009) was a civil Engineer and urban planner. He son of Angel Rafael Cuevas del Cid and Maria Soledad Cruz Sierra. He had three brothers: Marta Cuevas del León, Rafael Cuevas del Cid and José Rodolfo Cuevas Cruz. He studied at Colégio de Infantes and the Liceo Guatemala, where he graduated as valedictorian. In 1955 he represented Guatemala in the second Pan American Games, having won the gold medal in rowing competitions, along with his team.

Born Antigua Guatemala, he studied civil engineering at the University of San Carlos of Guatemala (USAC). At that time, he worked at the General Directorate of Roads and the Institute of Development of Municipal Works (INFOM), where he met Engineer Raul Aguilar Batres, great precursor of planning in Guatemala, who urged him to undertake graduate studies in urban planning. He attended the program led by Yale University, based in Lima, Peru, from 1960 to 1963. Upon his return to Guatemala in 1965, he continued to work in the INFOM as the first graduate in Urban Planning in the history of Guatemala. He then introduced urban planning methods that were used to make more effective the execution of public works and created the Center for Urban and Regional Studies (CEUR) USAC, where he taught until 1978, when he was appointed as the first manager of the Guatemalan Railroads, after its nationalization during the government of Julio César Méndez Montenegro.

Between 1970 and 1994, with a team of professionals, developed several master plans for the cities of Rio de Janeiro, Brazil, Santa Cruz, Bolivia, San Pedro Sula, Honduras, Nairobi, Kenya and Guatemala (1972–2000). In 1986, as part of the activities of the Centre for Political Studies (CEDEP), he participated in the drafting of the new Constitution of Guatemala and, in the same year, was in charge of the formation of the new electoral system in the first election of a civilian government during the internal armed conflict of Guatemala (1959–1996). In the 1960s he served as a member of the Board of the Faculty of Engineering of the USAC. From 1990 to 2007 he led the development of several low-cost housing projects, having introduced innovative concepts for planning and financing. At the same time, he developed the first plan for territorial ordering, at the national level, in Guatemala. He died on February 2, 2009.

The National Library of Guatemala inaugurated in 2016 a special room that houses the private collection of books on urban planning that belonged to Marco Antonio Cuevas.

== See also ==
- Raul Aguilar Batres

=== Bibliography ===
- Alfonso, Jesus (2016). "Familia de literatos dona libros a Biblioteca Nacional". Soy502 (in Spanish). Guatemala.
- Aragón, Jorge Rafael (2007). "Factores jurídico-políticos en la Regionalización del territorio nacional. La regionalización oficial 1944-2005" (PDF). CEUR USAC (in Spanish). Guatemala. Archived from the original (PDF) on 20 August 2016.
- CEUR, Consejo Directivo (2006). "Manual de organización del CEUR" (PDF). CEUR USAC (in Spanish). Guatemala.
- Cuevas, Marco Antonio (2000). "El problema del desarrollo urbano en Guatemala". Biblioteca Universidad Central USAC (in Spanish).
- Cuevas, Marco Antonio (2006). "Guatemala: Evolución del sector vivienda" (PDF). USAID (in Spanish). Guatemala. Archived from the original (PDF) on August 18, 2016.
- Corzo, Juan Antonio (2000). "Tesis: Construcciones sobre diseño y construcciones de almacenes generales de depósito" (PDF). Biblioteca Universidad Central USAC (in Spanish). Guatemala.
- García, Gustavo (2016). "Familiares de Cardoza y Aragón donan libros". Diario de Centroamérica (in Spanish). Guatemala. Archived from the original on 4 August 2016.
- Yurrita, Alfonso (2015). "Las decisiones". Prensa Libre (in Spanish). Guatemala.
