= Virginia Laparra =

Guatemalan lawyer (born 1980)

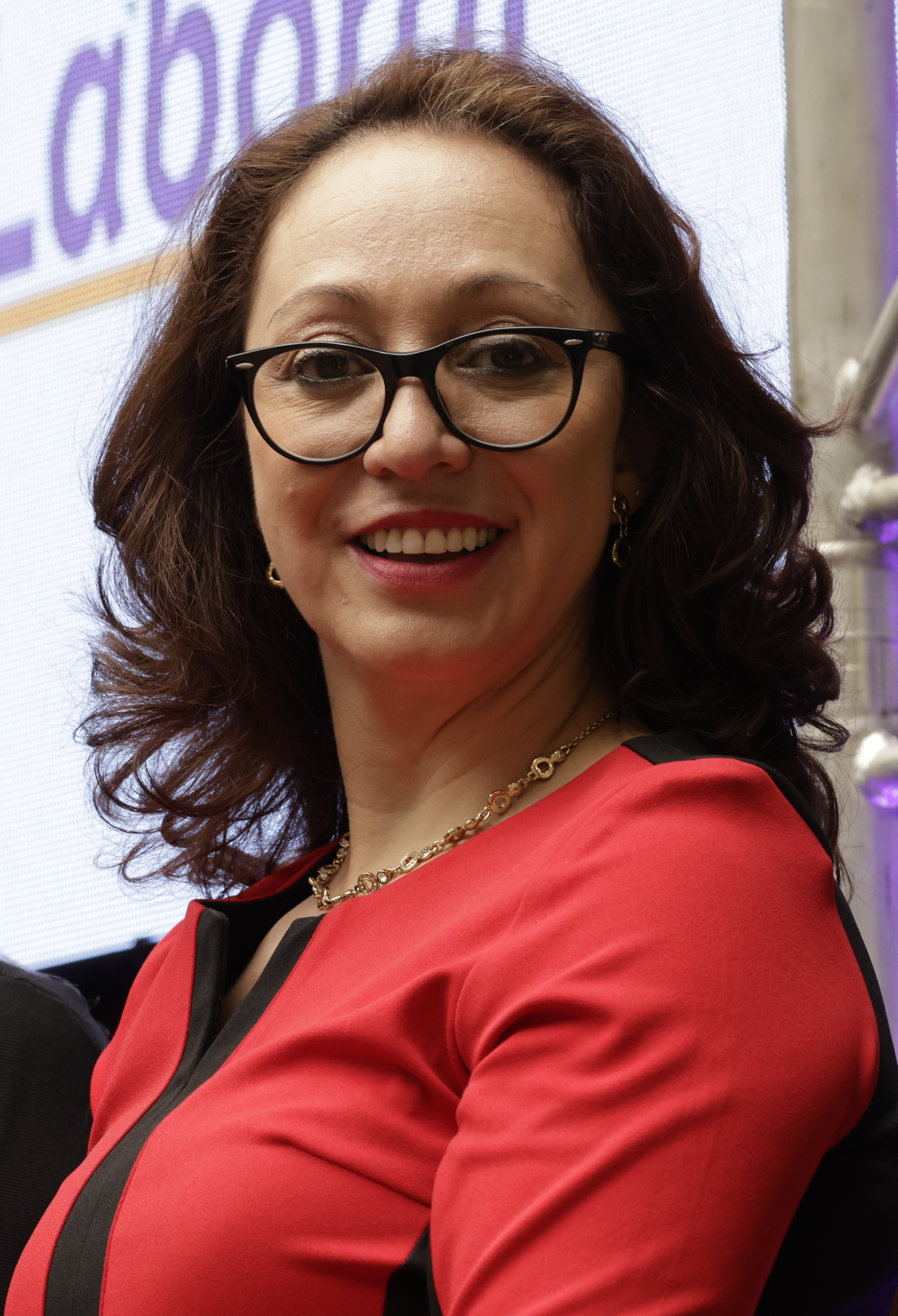
- Born: Lilian Virginia Laparra Rivas; 5 January 1985 (age 40); Quetzaltenango, Guatemala
- Occupation: Lawyer

Lilian Virginia Laparra Rivas (born 5 January 1985) is a Guatemalan lawyer and former anti-corruption prosecutor. She worked for the Special Prosecutor's Office Against Impunity between 2013 and 2020, trying over 200 people for corruption. As a result of her work, she was arbitrarily detained between February 2022 and January 2024, and fled Guatemala after receiving an additional prison sentence in July 2024.

== Career ==
Laparra was born and raised in Quetzaltenango. She studied law and worked for the Special Prosecutor's Office Against Corruption, working alongside the United Nations International Commission Against Impunity in Guatemala. Based in a court in Quetzaltenango, it went on to have authority in the departments of Quetzaltenango, Huehuetenango, Totonicapán, and San Marcos. Between its establishment in 2013 and the end of its mandate in 2020, the organisation tried over 200 people for corruption.

In 2019, the then-President of Guatemala, Jimmy Morales, did not renew Laparra's mandate to continue with the Special Prosecutor's Office, with it becoming defunct as of 2020. She continued to work as a prosecutor in Quetzaltenango.

== Arrest, trial and imprisonment ==
During her tenure with the Special Prosecutor's Office, Laparra raised concerns that a local judge, Lesther Castellanos, was leaking information about corruption cases. The accusation led to Castellanos being sanctioned. Castellanos subsequently filed a joint criminal complaint against Laparra with the Foundation Against Terrorism, accusing her of "abuse of authority".

In February 2022, Laparra was dismissed by the Attorney General, María Consuelo Porras, and was ordered to serve pre-trial detention, serving the first five months of this in solitary confinement at a prison in Guatemala City, following which she was transferred to Matamoros prison. In December 2022, Laparra was sentenced to four years' imprisonment for abuse of authority.

On 26 December 2023, the Supreme Court of Justice ordered for Laparra to be released within five days. On 3 January 2024, Laparra was released from custody after 680 days of detention. She was originally placed under house arrest.

On 29 January 2024, Laparra requested that Porras reinstate her in her previous role as a prosecutor in Quetzaltenango.

In July 2024, Laparra was given an additional five year commutable prison sentence on new charges linked to her prosecutor work, in addition to her fine. Following these new charges, Laparra fled Guatemala, initially settling in neighbouring Mexico. She wrote a public letter describing her decision to go into exile, stating she was "treated inhumanely" while in prison and that she had left Guatemala in orde to "preserve [her] life".

== Response ==
In November 2022, Amnesty International declared that Laparra was a prisoner of conscience, stating its concern at the systemic pattern of criminalisation imposed by the Guatemalan judiciary and Attorney General against former judges, prosecutors, human rights activists, and journalists.

On 18 May 2023, the United Nations Working Group on Arbitrary Detention issued an opinion considering Laparra to be arbitrarily detained, and called for her immediate release.

Human Rights Watch described the charges against Laparra as "spurious" and "retaliation" for her high-profile corruption cases against public officials and organised crime figures.

After Laparra fled Guatemala in self-imposed exile, the President of Guatemala, Bernardo Arévalo, lamented that "corrupt officials walk the streets with impunity" and that justice officials such as Laparra continued to be harassed by a "corrupt minority" within the Attorney General's office, including Arévalo himself.

In 2025, Laparra received the Alliance for Lawyers at Risk's Sir Henry Brooke Award, after being nominated by the Fund for Global Human Rights.
