= Rodolfo Galeotti Torres =

Guatemalan sculptor

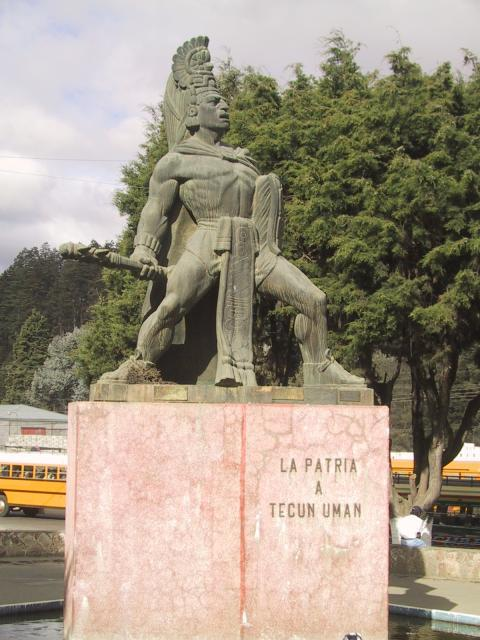
Bronze of Tecún Umán (1970) by Rodolfo Galeotti Torres in Quetzaltenango

Rodolfo Galeotti Torres (4 March 1912 – 22 May 1988) was a Guatemalan sculptor.

== Biography ==
Rodolfo Galeotti Torres was born in Quetzaltenango, Guatemala. He served as director of the Escuela Nacional de Artes Plásticas "Rafael Rodríguez Padilla". He created sculptures for National Palace in Guatemala City, including renditions of the Coat of Arms of Guatemala. In 1970, he created a renowned bronze of Tecún Umán, which is on display in Quetzaltenango. On May 16, 1988, he was awarded the Presidential Medal of Guatemala.

Galeotti Torres died in Guatemala City.
