= Ricardo Castillo (composer) =

Guatemalan composer (1891–1966)

Ricardo Castillo (October 1, 1891, Quetzaltenango — May 27, 1966, Guatemala City) was a Guatemalan composer.

== Life and career ==
Born in the city of Quetzaltenango in the western highlands of Guatemala, Ricardo Castillo is the younger brother of composer of Jesús Castillo. Demonstrating a talent and love for music as a child, his mother sent him to France to study the subject in 1906 at the age of 14. He remained in Europe for the next 16 years. There he studied violin in Paris with Narcisse-Augustin Lefort and harmony with Paul Vidal. Eventually his studies moved away from the violin entirely and he focused solely on music composition; publishing his first compositions for solo piano during this period in Paris.

In 1918 Castillo married the French pianist Georgette Contoux Quante who had graduated with honors from the Conservatoire de Paris where she had studied under Alfred Cortot. The couple moved to Guatemala in 1922 and two years later Castillo joined the faculty of the Conservatorio Nacional de Música in Guatemala City as a professor of harmony, music history, and composition; a position he maintained until his retirement in 1960. In 1948 Castillo submitted entries under pseudonyms in all three categories of the Science, Literature and Arts National Contest in Guatemala; and won all three prizes. He won the arts prize again in 1951 with his Eight piano Preludes.
