= Hospital Nacional San Juan de Dios =

Hospital in Guatemala

Coordinates: 14°51′26″N 91°32′24″W

The Hospital Nacional San Juan de Dios is a public hospitals in Guatemala. It is located in Quetzaltenango, Guatemala's second largest city.

On July 25, 2000 it hit the news when an outbreak of meningitis killed 15 newborn babies and left three others seriously ill.
