= List of hospitals in Guatemala =

This is a list of hospitals in Guatemala, Central America,

== Guatemala City ==
=== Zone 1 ===
Cedros de Libano (Cedars of Lebanon)
Private hospital. Address: 8 Avenida 2–48, Zone 1, Ciudad de Guatemala.
Hospital Ángeles
Address: Private hospital. 24-hour emergency department, pediatrics, maternity, and other services. 2a. avenida 14-74 Zona 1, Ciudad de Guatemala.
Hospital Colón
Specialises in treating diabetes. Address: 8a. calle 11-49 Zona 1, Ciudad de Guatemala.
Hermeroteca Nacional
Public hospital. Address: "Lic. Clemente Marroquin Rojas", 5 Av 7–26, Zona 1, Ciudad de Guatemala.
Hospital La Paz
A branch of the central La Paz hospital in Zone 11. Address: 8a. avenida 2-48, Zona 1, Ciudad de Guatemala.
Hospital de la Polcia Nacional
Public hospital. Address: 11 Av 4-49, Zona 1, Ciudad de Guatemala.
Hospital San Pablo (Saint Paul Hospital)
Private hospital founded 1976. 24-hour emergency department. Address: 8a. calle 1-43 Zona 1, Ciudad de Guatemala.
Hospital Santa Margarita (Saint Margarita Hospital)
24-hour emergency service, gynaecology department. Address: 11 calle 3-52 Zona 1, Ciudad de Guatemala.
San Juan de Dios (Saint John of God)
Public hospital with emergency centre and 70 other services. Address: 1a. avenida 10-50 Zona 1, Ciudad de Guatemala.

=== Zone 2 ===
Latino Americano
Private hospital. Address: 7 Avenida A 7–50, Zona 2, Ciudad de Guatemala.

=== Zone 4 ===
Hospital General de Accidentes
13 Av y Calz, San Juan Zona 4 Mixco, Ciudad de Guatemala.

=== Zone 10 ===
Centro de Epilepsia y Neurocirugía Funcional (Center for Epilepsy and Functional Neurosurgery)
Specialises in epilepsy. Address: 7a. calle "A" 1-62, Zona 10, Ciudad de Guatemala.
Centro Hospitalario La Paz (La Paz Hospital Centre)
Six hospitals throughout Guatemala. Emergencies, laboratories, outpatients. Address: 3a. calle final 10-70, Zona 10, Ciudad de Guatemala.
Centro Medico (Medical Centre)
24 hour emergency department, intensive care, various laboratories at different branches in Guatemala City. Official site.
Hospital Herrera Llerandi
Private hospital. 24 hour emergency department, pediatrics, orthopaedics and traumatology. Address: 6a. avenida 8-71, Zona 10, Ciudad de Guatemala.
Hospital Universitario Esperanza (Esperanza University Hospital)
Private hospital. 24 hour emergency department, intensive care unit, maternity, private rooms. Address: 6a. avenida 7-49, Zona 10, Ciudad de Guatemala.

=== Zone 11 ===
Centro Hospitalario La Paz (La Paz Hospital Centre)
One of a chain of hospitals in Guatemala. 24 hour emergency department, and specialised departments. Address: 17 avenida. 28-01, Zona 11, Ciudad de Guatemala.
Hospital Hermano Pedro
Emergency care, intensive care unit, specialised departments. Address: 17 Avenida, 23-49, Anillo Periférico, Zona 11, Ciudad de Guatemala.
Hospital Roosevelt
Public hospital, 24 hour emergency department, and specialised departments. Address: Calzada Roosevelt 6–58, Zona 11, Ciudad de Guatemala.
Sanatorio Materno Infantil Majadas (Majadas Sanatorium for Children)
Specialises in maternity and related surgery. Address: 30 avenida A, 3-39 Zona 11 Utatlan II, Ciudad de Guatemala.
UNICAR
Specialises in cardiovascular disease, emergency care, surgery. Address: 5a. avenida 6-22 Zona 11 Ciudad de Guatemala.

=== Zone 12 ===
Hospital de Gineco-Obstetrica
Public hospital. Address: 14 Av y 4 C, Zona 12 Col Colinas de Pamplona, Planta Telefónica, Ciudad de Guatemala.
Hospital de Rehabilitacion
14 Av y 4 C, Zona 12 Colinas de Pamplona, Ciudad de Guatemala.

=== Zone 14 ===
Hospital Bella Aurora
Private hospital. Address: 10 Calle 2–31, Zona 14, Ciudad de Guatemala.

=== Zone 15 ===
Nuestra Señora del Pilar
Private hospital. Address: 3 Calle 10–71, Zona 15, Ciudad de Guatemala.

=== Zone 18 ===
Hospital de Salud Mental
Public hospital. Address: Zona 18 Col Atlántida, Ciudad de Guatemala.

== Quetzaltenango ==
Hospital Nacional San Juan de Dios
Public hospital.

== Bibliography ==
- "Hospitales en la Zona 10 de la Cuidad de Guatemala", guatemala.com, retrieved 26 September 2021.
- McNally, Shelagh, Pocket Adventures Guatemala, Hunter Publishing, 2006 ISBN 1588435288.
