= Jesús Castillo (composer) =

Guatemalan composer (1877–1946)

Jesús Castillo Monterroso (1877-1946) was a Guatemalan composer. He is the older brother of composer Ricardo Castillo. He was the first musician to collect a sizable amount of Guatemalan folk music, which he later used in works such as his opera Quiché Vinak, as well as overtures and symphonic poems. His piano music, as well as his orchestral output, reflects the fusion of his contemporary art with Mayan mythology such as legends and myths from the Popol Vuh. The national youth orchestra of Guatemala, the Orquesta Sinfónica Jesús Castillo (established in 1997), was named in his honor.
