= Quetzaltenango =

City in Guatemala

Quetzaltenango Xelajú (K'iche')
- Municipality and city
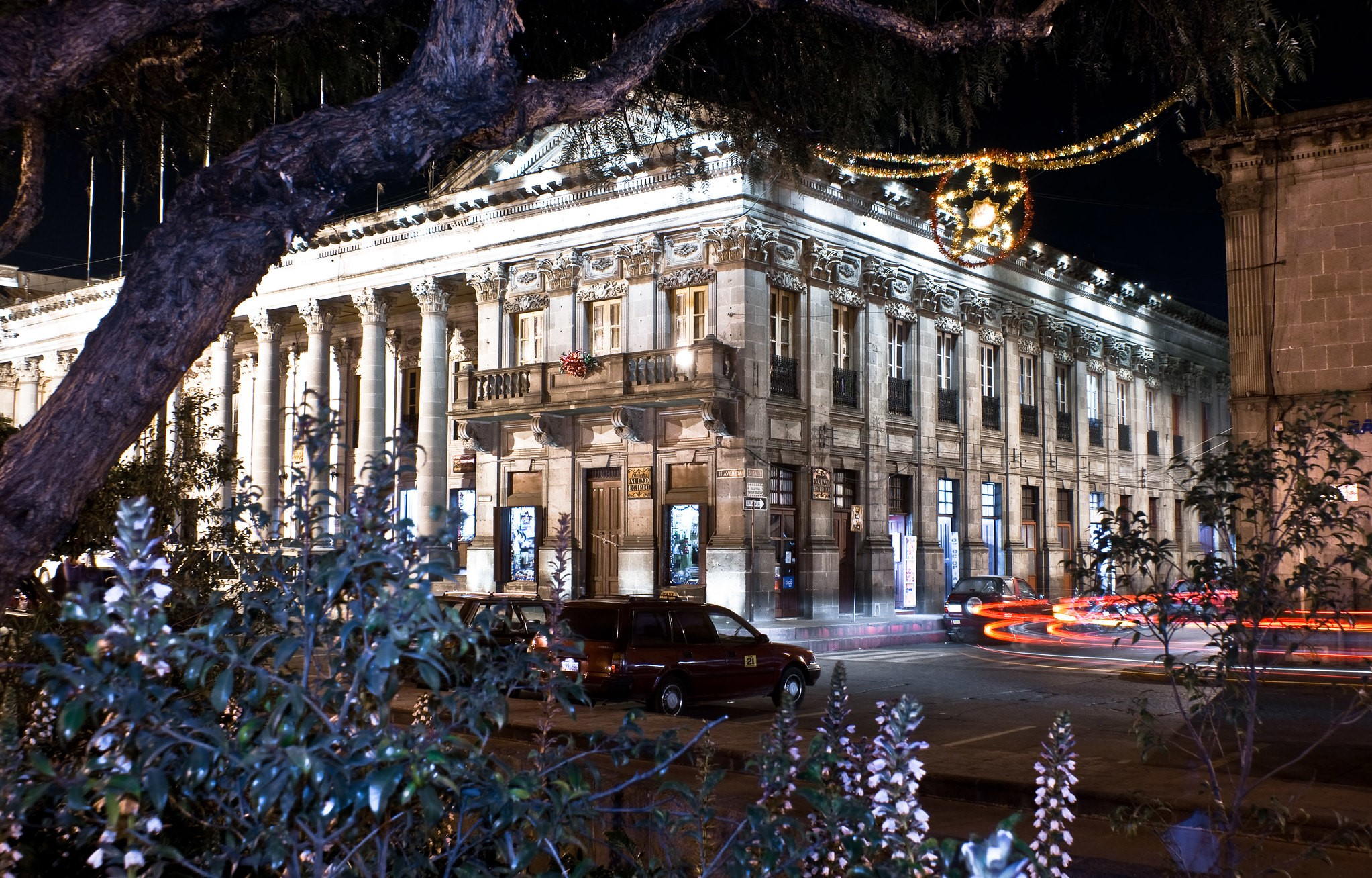
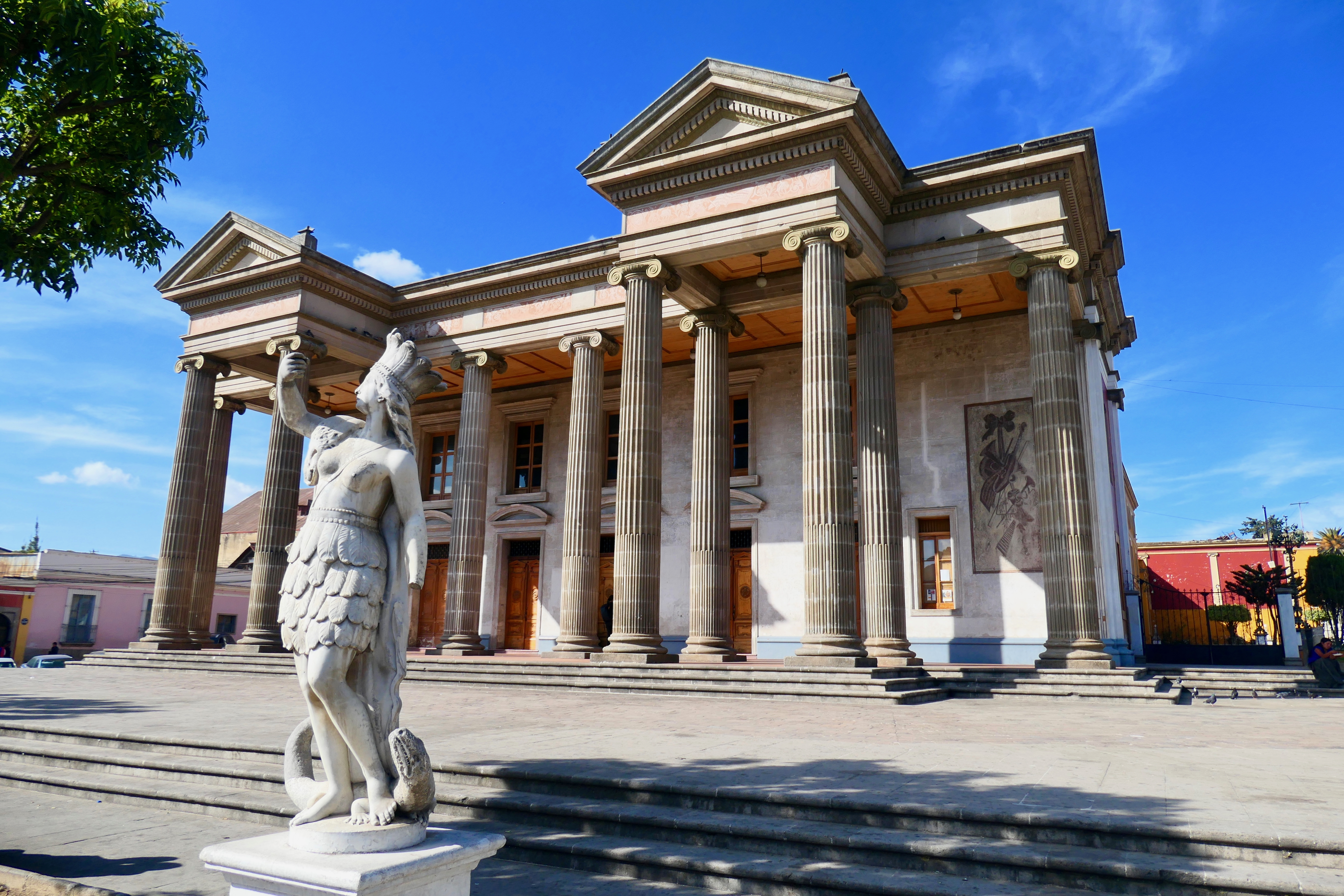
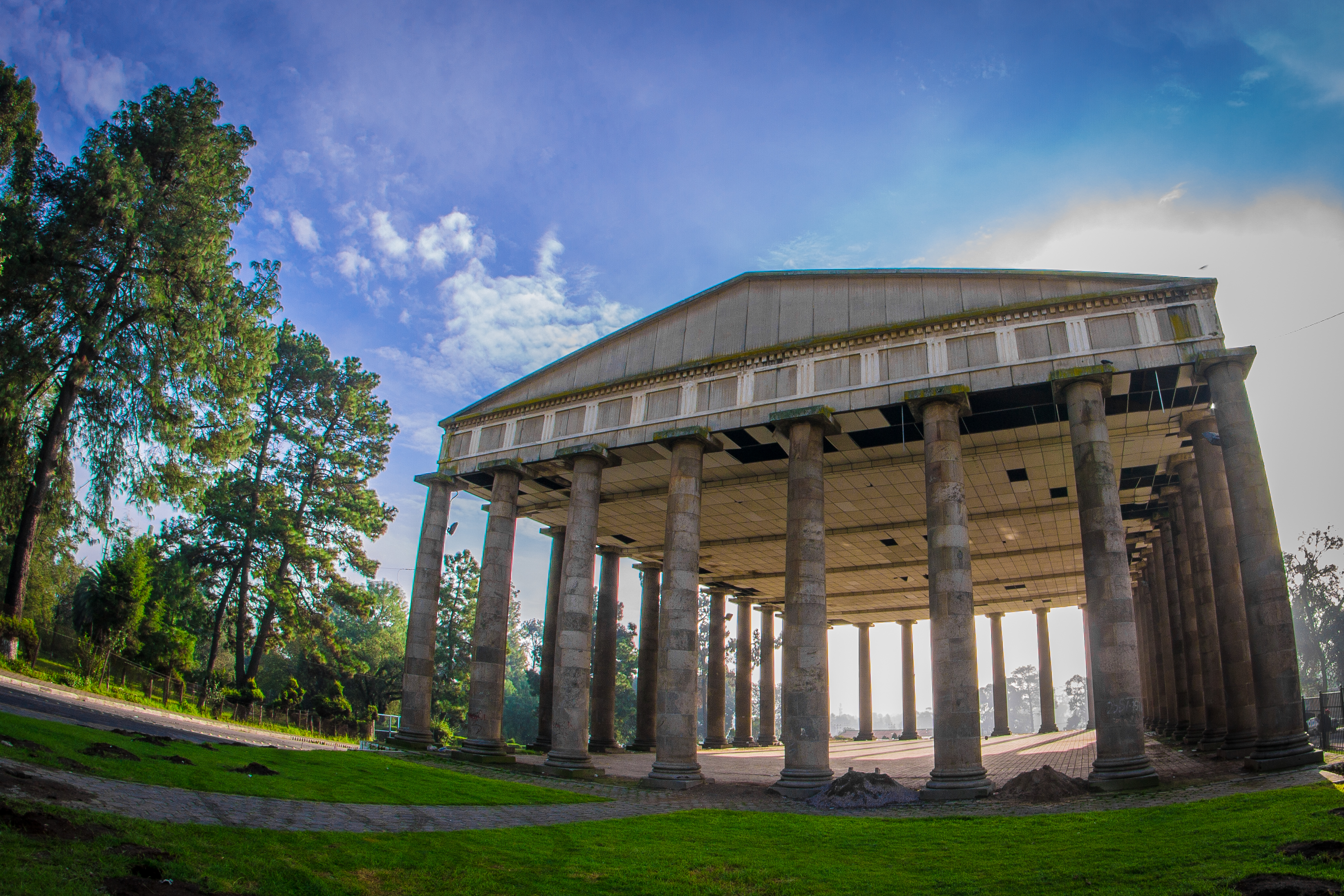
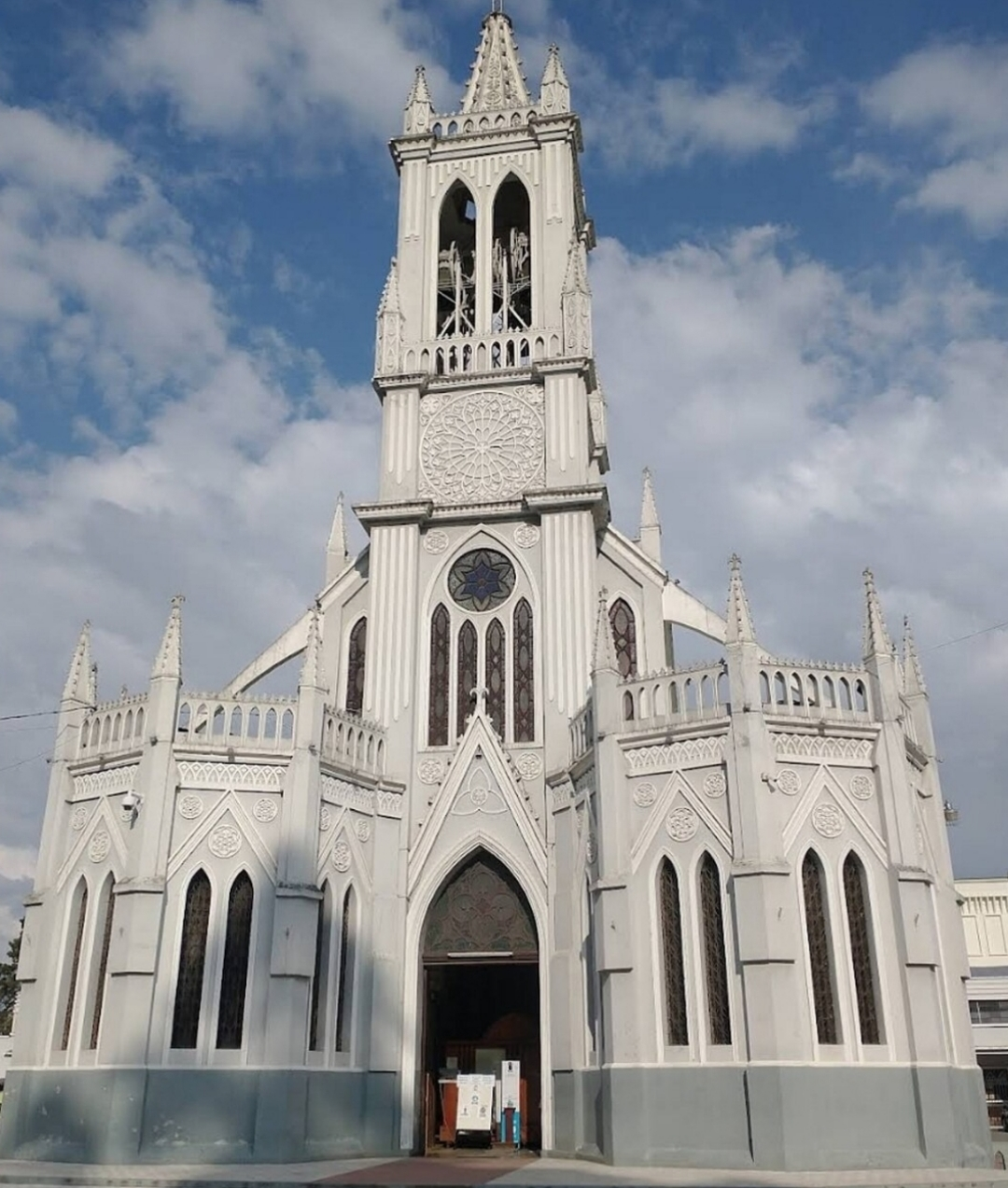
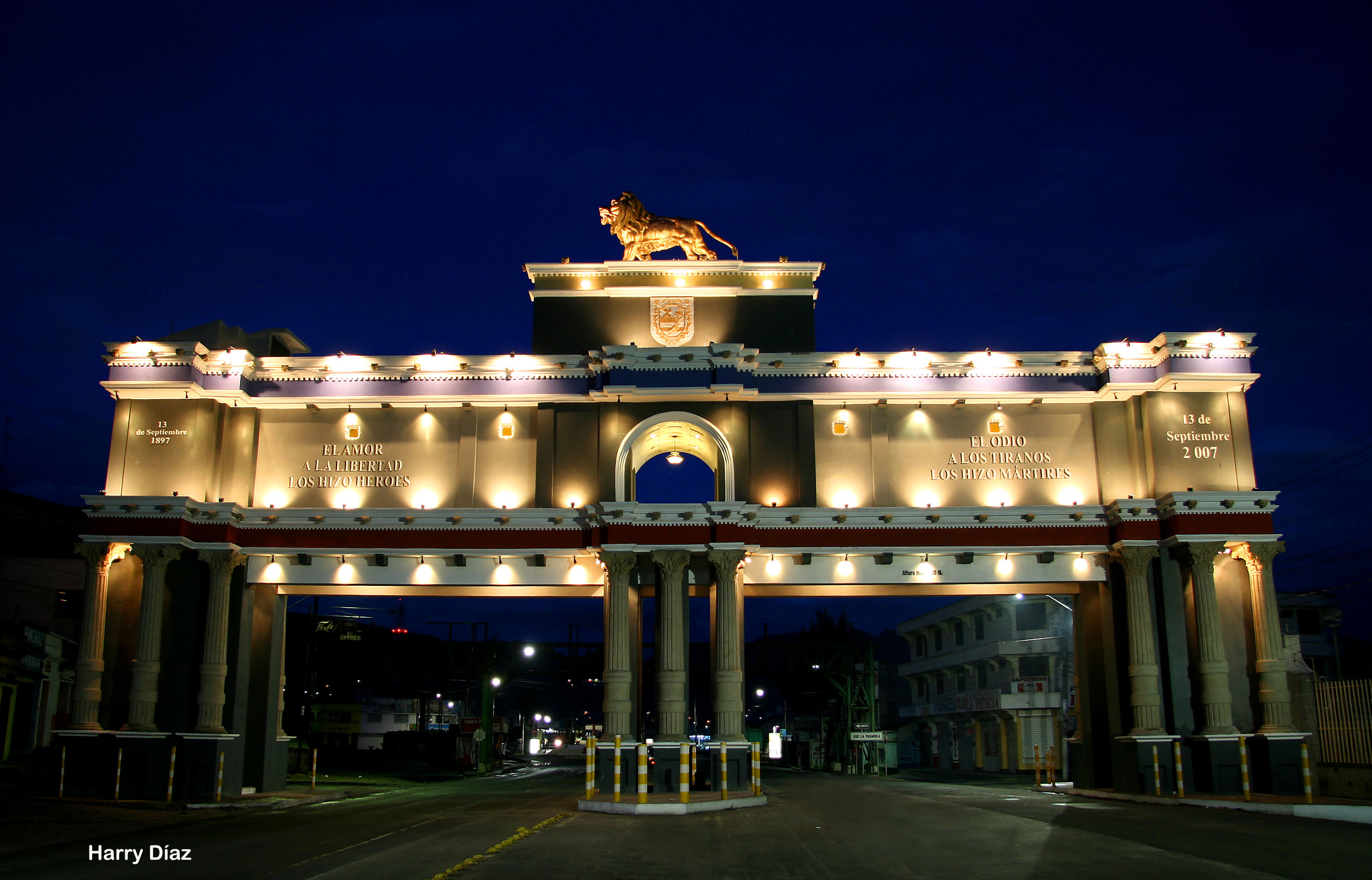
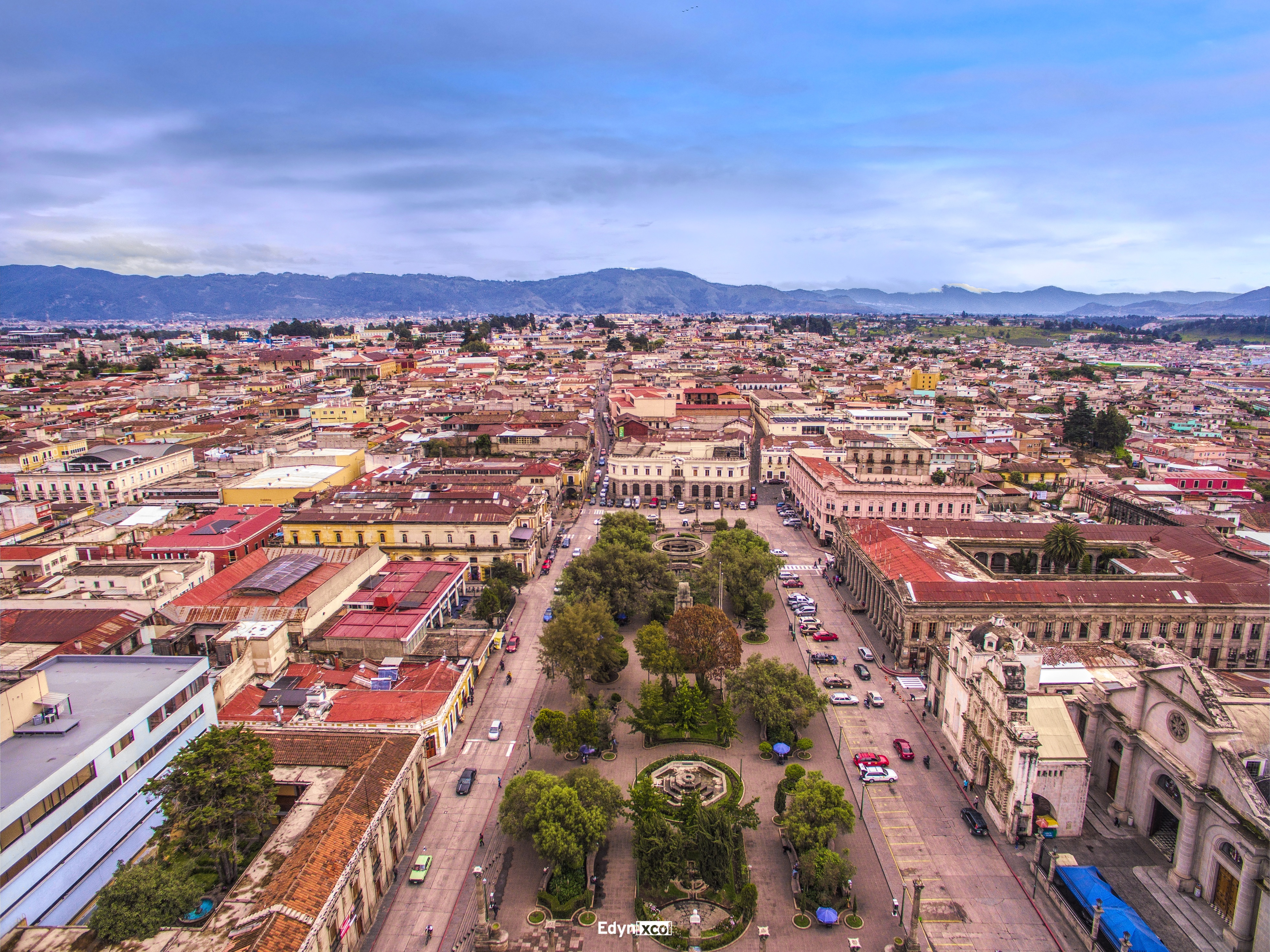
- Central America Park Government Palace City Theatre Temple of Minerva Church of San Nicolás Sixth State Arc View of the historic center area

- Location in Guatemala Quetzaltenango (Quetzaltenango Department)
- Coordinates: 14°50′40″N 91°30′05″W
- Country: Guatemala
- Department: Quetzaltenango
- Spanish foundation: 15 May 1524

Government
  - Type: Municipality
  - Mayor: Juan Fernando López, Partido Humanista

Area
  - Municipality and city: 122 km^{2} (47 sq mi)
- Elevation: 2,330 m (7,640 ft)

Population (2018 census)
  - Municipality and city: 180,706
  - Rank: 6th in Guatemala
  - Density: 1,480/km^{2} (3,840/sq mi)
  - Metro: 748,174
- Demonym: Quetzalteco/a
- Time zone: UTC-6 (Central America)
- Postal code: 09001
- Climate: Oceanic climate: subtropical highland variety (Cwb)

Quetzaltenango (Spanish pronunciation: [keˌtsal.teˈnaŋ.ɡo], also known by its Kʼicheʼ Maya name Xelajú [ʃelaˈχu] or Xela [ˈʃela], is a municipality and the capital of the namesake department in western Guatemala. Situated within a high-altitude volcanic basin of the Sierra Madre at an elevation of 2,330 metres (7,640 ft) above sea level, the city is encircled by prominent volcanic complexes including Santa María, Santiaguito, and Cerro Quemado. It functions as the primary economic, educational, and cultural hub of the southwestern Guatemalan highlands.

Quetzaltenango is a part of the Los Altos Metropolitan Area, which also includes the municipalities of Salcajá, Cantel, Almolonga, Zunil, Concepción Chiquirichapa, San Mateo, La Esperanza, San Juan Ostuncalco, Olintepeque, San Miguel Sigüilá, and Cajolá in Quetzaltenango Department, as well as San Cristóbal Totonicapán and San Andrés Xecul in Totonicapán Department.

As of the 2018 census, the city has a population of 180,706 in 122 km^{2} (47 sq mi). 43% of the population was indigenous Guatemalan in 2014.

== Etymology ==
The word "Quetzaltenango" is a Nahuatl word meaning "the walled place of the quetzal bird." The resplendent quetzal is the national bird of Guatemala, and the Guatemalan quetzal is the currency of Guatemala. Quetzaltenango became the city's official name in colonial times.

Many people, especially the indigenous population and locals, refer to the city by its Kʼicheʼ Mayan name, "Xelajú", or more commonly "Xela". This name is derived from the indigenous xe laju' noj, meaning "under ten mountains", referring to the mountain range of the Sierra Madre de Chiapas near the city. Some proudly but unofficially consider it the "capital of the Mayas".

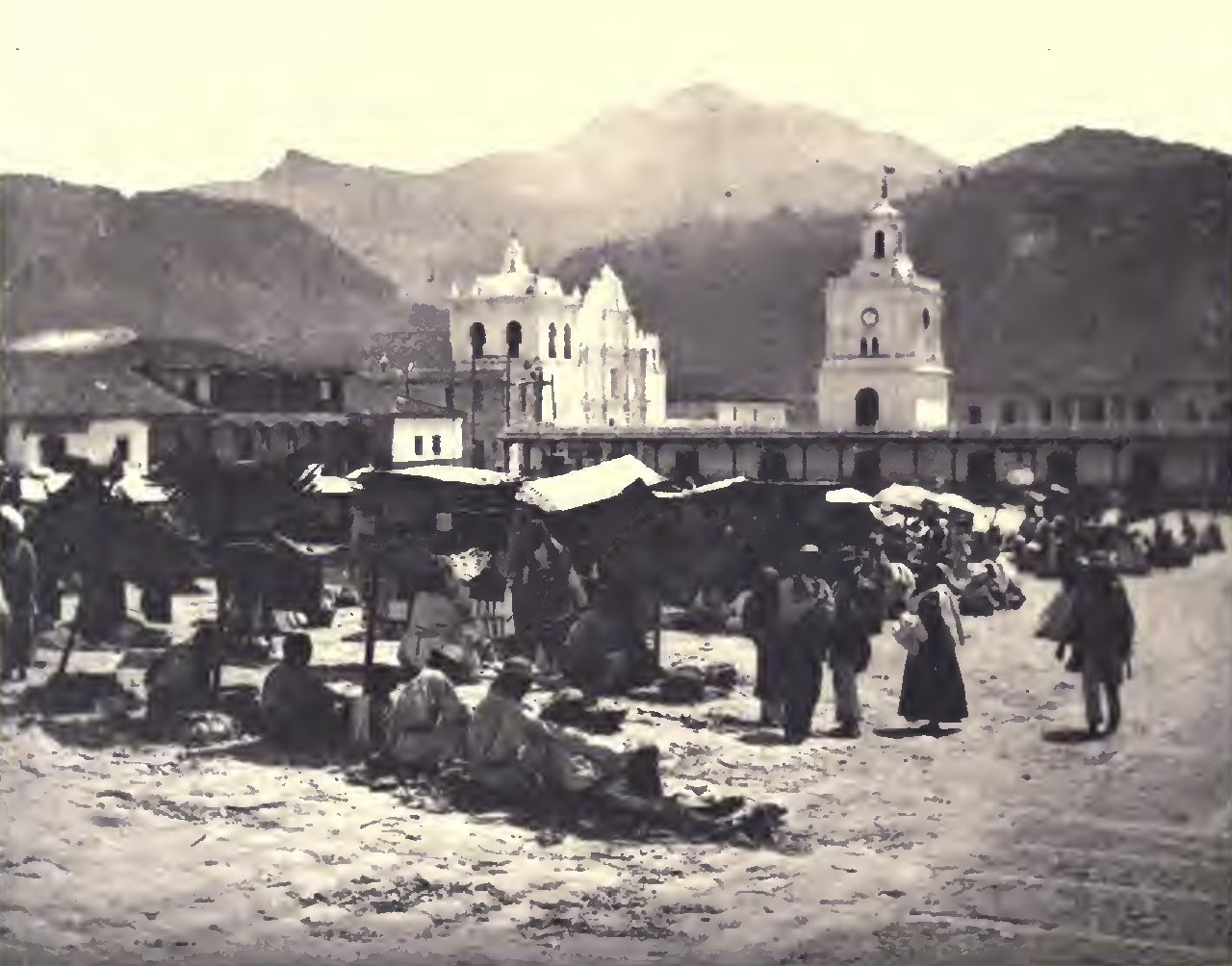
Quetzaltenango central park c. 1894

=== Kʼicheʼ toponymy and ethnobotanical semantics ===
The indigenous naming conventions and linguistic structures around the Xelajú basin operate as an oral geographic record, mapping highland micro-climates, sacred volcanic topography, and regional medicinal flora. The Kʼicheʼ language uses relational morphology where spatial roots denote precise ecological and altitudinal zones across the southwestern highlands.

Semantic Architecture and Ethnobotanical Classification of the Xelajú Basin
Local / Kʼicheʼ Term	Linguistic Root & Etymology	Ecological & Geographic Context	Ethnobotanical & Community Role
Xelajú	Xe laju' noj ("Under ten wisdoms/mountains")	Volcanic basin surrounded by ten peaks, including Santa María and Cerro Quemado.	Defines ancestral territorial identity and sacred altitudinal boundaries.
Palajunoj	Paj laju' noj ("Place of ten knowledge nodes")	High-altitude agricultural valley situated along the southwestern volcanic flank.	Core center for traditional Milpa cultivation and communal land stewardship.
Chuj	K'iche': Chuj (Steam sauna)	Domed masonry bath heated by volcanic stones and aromatic herbs.	Medicinal hydrotherapy utilized for post-partum recovery and thermoregulation.
Tz'ite'	Erythrina berteroana	Nitrogen-fixing tree planted as living fences along mountain agricultural plots.	Seeds used in traditional divination ceremonies by local Kʼicheʼ spiritual guides.

== History ==
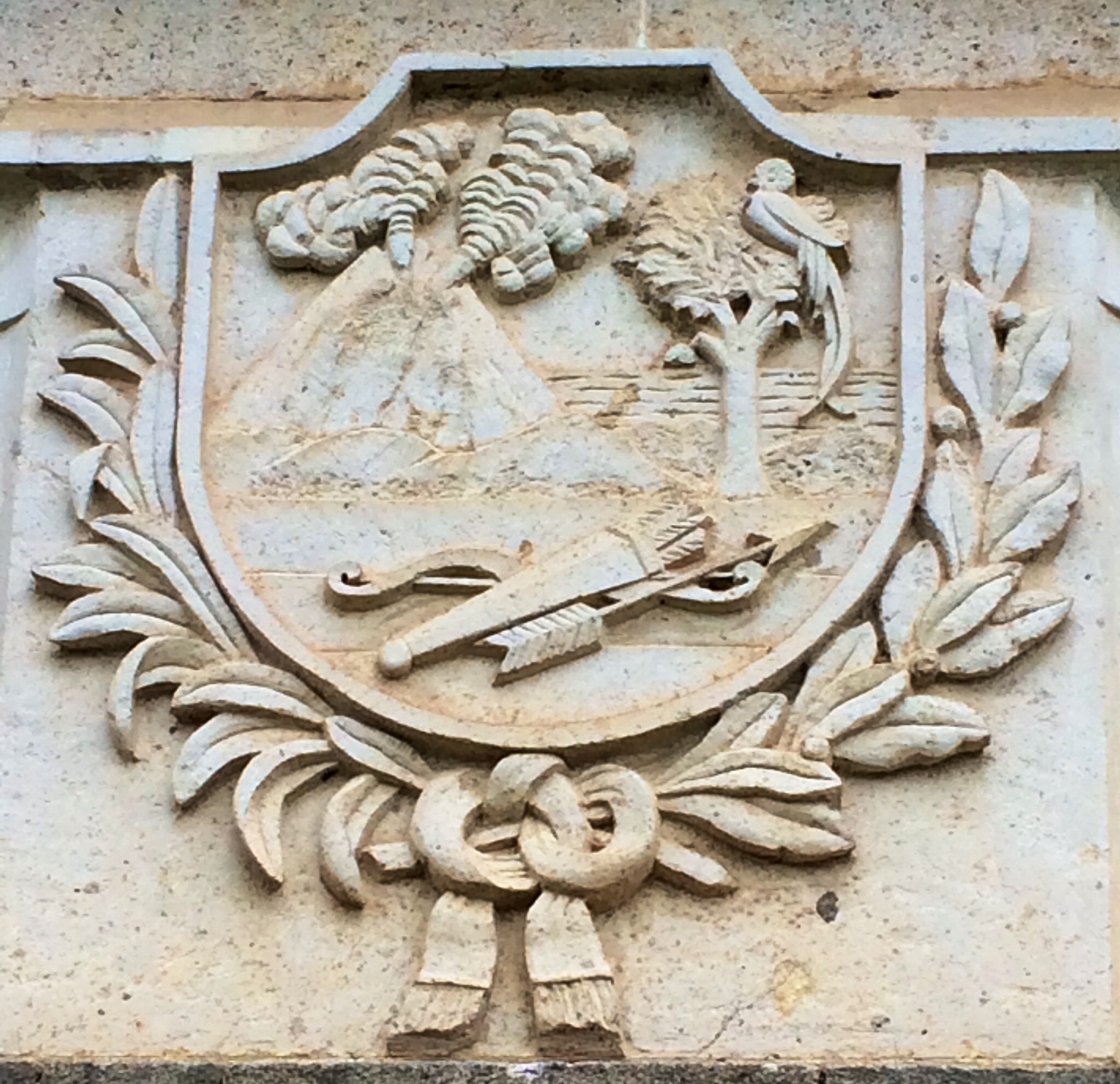
Coat of arms of Los Altos, carved in stone on the grave of heroes in the Cemetery

In pre-Columbian times, Quetzaltenango was a city of the Mam Mayans, although by the time of the Spanish conquest in 1524, it had become part of the K'iche' Kingdom of Q'umarkaj. The city was said to have already been over 300 years old when the Spanish first arrived. With the help of his allies, Conquistador Pedro de Alvarado defeated and killed the Maya ruler Tecún Umán here.

From 1838 to 1840 Quetzaltenango was the capital of the state of Los Altos, one of the states or provinces of the Federal Republic of Central America. As the union broke up, the army of Rafael Carrera conquered Quetzaltenango making it part of Guatemala. In 1850, the city had a population of approximately 20,000.

During the 19th century, coffee was introduced as a major crop in the area. As a result, the economy of Xela prospered. Much fine Belle Époque architecture can still be found in the city.

On October 24, 1902, at 5:00 pm, the Santa María Volcano erupted. Rocks and ash fell on Quetzaltenango at 6 PM, only one hour after the eruption.

In the 1920s, a young Romani woman named Vanushka Cardena Barajas died and was buried in the Xela city cemetery. An active legend has developed around her tomb that says those who bring flowers or write a request on her tomb will be reunited with their former romantic partners. The Guatemalan songwriter Alvaro Aguilar wrote a song based on this legend.

In 1930 the only electric railway in Guatemala, the Ferrocarril de Los Altos, was inaugurated. It was built by AEG and Krupp and had 14 train cars. The track connected Quetzaltenango with San Felipe, Retalhuleu. It was soon destroyed by mudslides and finally demolished in 1933. The people of Quetzaltenango are still very proud of the railway. A railway museum has been established in the city center.

Since the late 1990s Quetzaltenango has been having an economic boom, which makes it the city with the second-highest contribution to the Guatemalan economy. With its first high-rise buildings being built, it is expected by 2015 to have a more prominent skyline, with buildings up to 15 floors tall.

In 2008, the Central American Congress PARLACEN announced that every September 15, Quetzaltenango will be Central America's capital of culture.

Quetzaltenango was supposed to host 2018 Central American and Caribbean Games but dropped out due to a lack of funding for the event.

In March 2022, indigenous activists began blockading the central waste deposit near Valle de Palajunoj to protest a city development plan enacted by the municipal authorities in June 2017.

== Climate ==
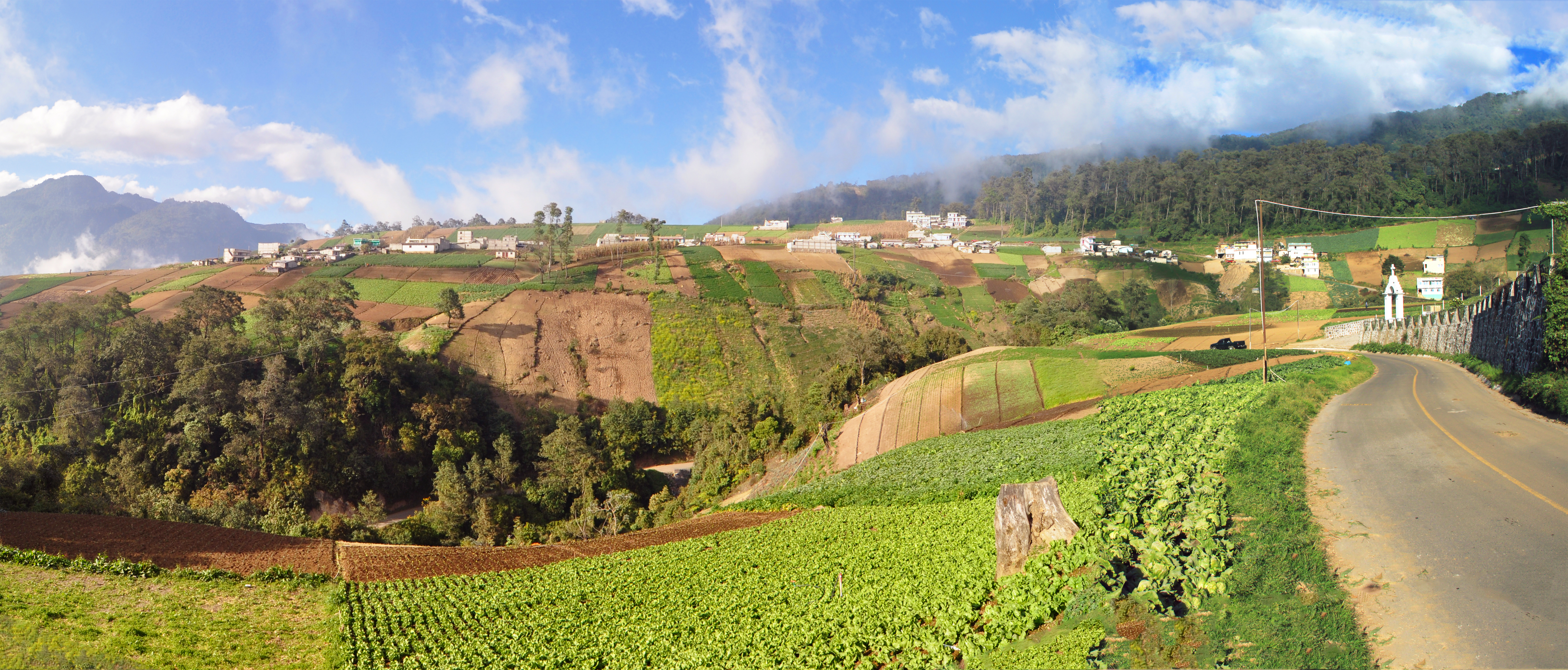
Farming highlands

According to Köppen climate classification, Quetzaltenango features a subtropical highland climate (Cwb). In general, the climate in Quetzaltenango can go from mild to chilly, with occasional sporadic warm episodes. The daily high is usually reached around noon. From then on, temperatures decrease exceptionally fast. The city is quite dry, except during the rainy season. Quetzaltenango is the coolest major city in Guatemala.

There are two main seasons in Quetzaltenango (as in all of Guatemala); the rainy season, which generally runs from late May through late October, and the dry season, which runs from early November until April. During the rainy season, rain falls consistently, usually in the afternoons, but there are occasions in which it rains all day long or at least during the morning. During the dry season, the city frequently will not receive a single drop of rain for months on end.

The coldest months are November through February, with minimum temperatures averaging 4 °C or 39.2 °F, and maximum temperatures averaging 22 °C or 71.6 °F. The warmest months are March through July, with minimum temperatures averaging 8 °C or 46.4 °F and maximum temperatures averaging 23 °C or 73.4 °F. Yearly, the average low is 6.4 °C or 43.5 °F and the average high is 22.5 °C or 72.5 °F.

Climate data for Quetzaltenango - Labor Ovalle Weather Station (Temp.: 1991−2010 / Prec.: 1980−2010)
Month	Jan	Feb	Mar	Apr	May	Jun	Jul	Aug	Sep	Oct	Nov	Dec	Year
Record high °C (°F)	28.4 (83.1)	29.8 (85.6)	30.0 (86.0)	28.2 (82.8)	30.2 (86.4)	26.5 (79.7)	25.2 (77.4)	25.0 (77.0)	26.0 (78.8)	25.2 (77.4)	25.6 (78.1)	26.2 (79.2)	30.2 (86.4)
Mean daily maximum °C (°F)	22.0 (71.6)	23.5 (74.3)	25.5 (77.9)	23.8 (74.8)	23.1 (73.6)	21.9 (71.4)	21.9 (71.4)	22.1 (71.8)	20.9 (69.6)	21.7 (71.1)	21.3 (70.3)	22.1 (71.8)	22.5 (72.5)
Daily mean °C (°F)	12.9 (55.2)	13.7 (56.7)	14.8 (58.6)	15.8 (60.4)	15.8 (60.4)	15.6 (60.1)	15.8 (60.4)	15.8 (60.4)	15.2 (59.4)	15.0 (59.0)	14.0 (57.2)	13.2 (55.8)	14.7 (58.5)
Mean daily minimum °C (°F)	2.3 (36.1)	2.9 (37.2)	3.9 (39.0)	6.3 (43.3)	8.8 (47.8)	9.3 (48.7)	8.2 (46.8)	8.5 (47.3)	9.0 (48.2)	8.4 (47.1)	6.0 (42.8)	2.8 (37.0)	6.4 (43.4)
Record low °C (°F)	−11.5 (11.3)	−5.4 (22.3)	−5.2 (22.6)	−3.6 (25.5)	0.6 (33.1)	1.0 (33.8)	2.5 (36.5)	0.5 (32.9)	1.0 (33.8)	0.0 (32.0)	−5.5 (22.1)	−5.4 (22.3)	−11.5 (11.3)
Average rainfall mm (inches)	1.8 (0.07)	5.5 (0.22)	14.4 (0.57)	41.2 (1.62)	131.6 (5.18)	147.8 (5.82)	98.7 (3.89)	107.0 (4.21)	134.7 (5.30)	93.6 (3.69)	18.7 (0.74)	7.1 (0.28)	802.1 (31.59)
Average rainy days (≥ 0.1 mm)	0.8	0.9	2.3	5.9	16.8	21.9	18.0	17.5	22.8	14.5	5.7	2.1	129.2
Average relative humidity (%)	65.7	63.1	64.5	68.4	74.5	79.4	74.5	76.1	81.2	79.3	72.7	68.6	72.3
Mean monthly sunshine hours	249.6	240.3	249.3	212.8	167.1	142.3	185.3	187.5	135.6	156.9	199.2	228.7	2,354.6
Source: Instituto Nacional de Sismologia, Vulcanologia, Meteorologia, e Hidrologia

== Economy ==
Historically, the city produced wheat, maize, fruits, and vegetables. It also had a healthy livestock industry. Livestock was exported throughout the country and to El Salvador. As of 1850, wheat was the largest export, followed by cacao, sugar, wool and cotton.

== Sports ==
Quetzaltenango is home to the Club Xelajú MC soccer team. The team competes at Estadio Mario Camposeco which has a capacity of 13,500 and is the most successful non-capital team in the Liga Nacional de Fútbol de Guatemala.

Due to the city's high altitude many athletes have prepared themselves here such as Olympic silver medalist Erick Barrondo and the 2004 Cuban volleyball team.

The swimming team has enjoyed success in national and international events.

Quetzaltenango withdrew from hosting the 2018 Central American and Caribbean Games. It planned to build a 30,000-seat stadium by 2016, as well seven new facilities for indoor sports and aquatics.

== Transportation ==
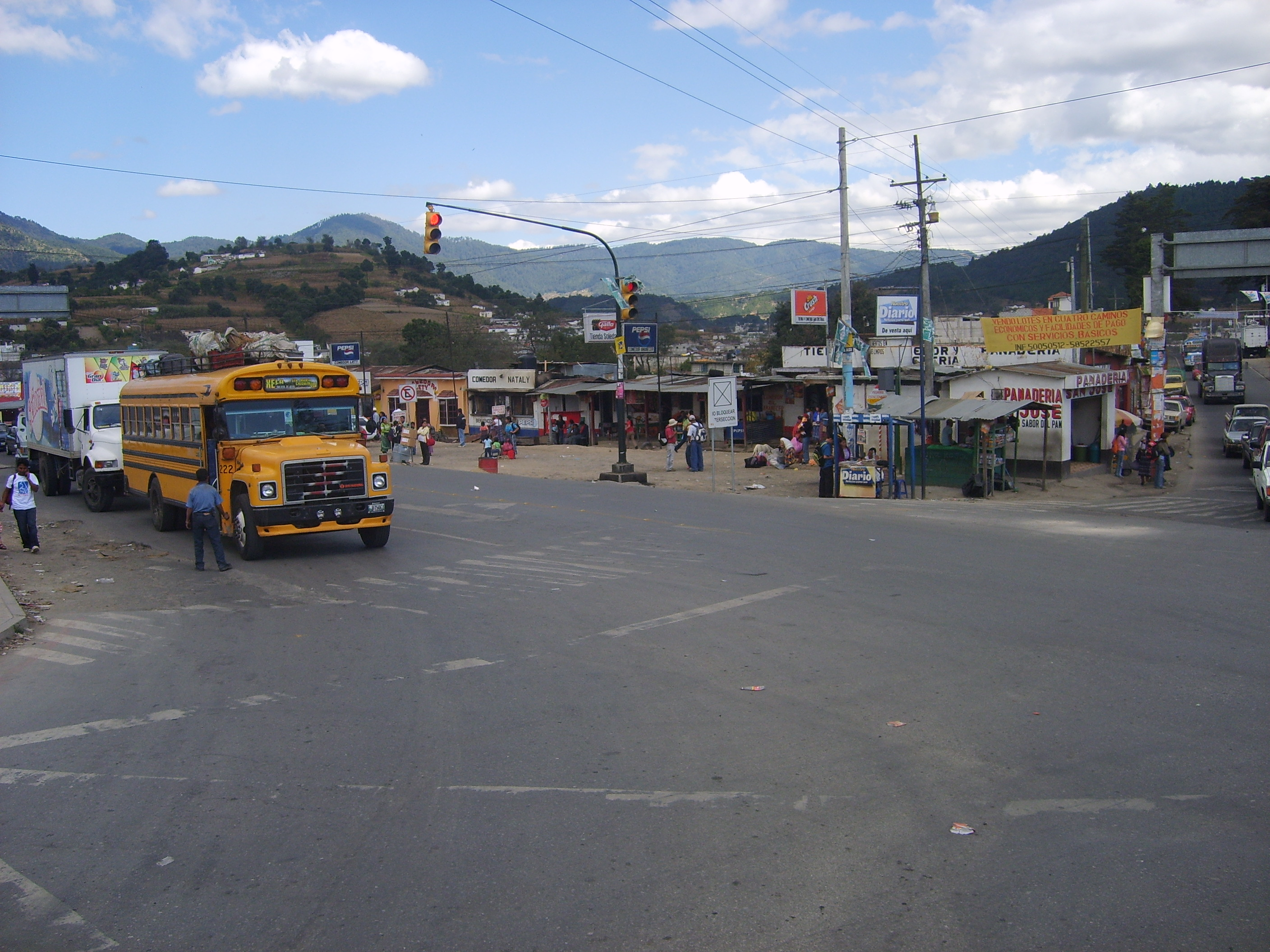
The Cuatro Caminos intersection is outside the city.

The city has a system of micro-buses for quick and cheap movement. A micro-bus is essentially a large van stuffed with seats. Micro-buses are numbered based on the route they take (e.g., "Ruta 7"). There is no government-run mass transport system in the city. The sole public means of transport is the bus or micro-buses. Transportation to other cities is provided by bus. Bicycling is a way to get around and to travel to (and in) rural areas. Quetzaltenango Airport provides air service to the city.

== Education ==
Quetzaltenango (Xela) is home to many schools and Universities that provide Education to locals and thousands of students from the surrounding cities and departments (states) and international students from North America and Europe. The educational establishments of Quetzaltenango include:

- Centro Universitario de Occidente San Carlos de Guatemala (CUNOC)
- Universidad Rafael Landivar
- Universidad Mariano Gálvez
- Universidad Mesoamericana
- Universidad de Occidente
- Universidad Galileo

== People born in Quetzaltenango ==
- Jacobo Árbenz Guzmán (1913–1971), President of Guatemala
- Manuel Barillas (1845–1907), President of Guatemala
- Jesús Castillo (1877–1946), Musician
- Ricardo Castillo (1891–1966), composer
- Manuel Estrada Cabrera (1898–1924), President of Guatemala
- Rodolfo Galeotti Torres (1912–1988), sculptor
- Alberto Fuentes Mohr (1927–1979), economist, finance minister, foreign minister, social-democratic leaders
- Comandante Rolando Morán (1929–1998), one of the guerrilla leaders in the Guatemalan Civil War
- Virginia Laparra (born 1980), lawyer
- Carlos Navarrete Cáceres (b. 1931), anthropologist and writer
- Efraín Recinos (1928–2011), engineer, architect, sculptor
- Otto René Castillo (b. 1934), poet and revolutionary
- Rodolfo Robles (1878–1939), physician and philanthropist
- Julio Serrano Echeverría (b. 1983), poet and writer
- José Carlos de Gálvez y Valiente (1831, 1838, 1853), Alcalde Primero del Ayantamiento de Quetzaltenango

== Consular representations ==
- Mobile Consulate of El Salvador
- Consulate of Italy (Closed)
- Consulate of Mexico
- Honorary Consulate of Spain

== Twin towns – sister cities ==
Quetzaltenango is twinned with:

- Campeche, Mexico
- Chiapa de Corzo, Mexico
- Livermore, United States
- San Cristóbal de Las Casas, Mexico
- Santa Fe, Spain
- Santa María Huatulco, Mexico
- Tapachula, Mexico
- Tromsø, Norway
- Turin, Italy
- Veracruz, Mexico

== See also ==
- Hospital Nacional San Juan de Dios
- Luna de Xelajú
- History of Guatemala
- History of Central America
