= J. Eric S. Thompson =

English Mesoamerican archaeologist (1898–1975)

- Born: 31 December 1898; London, United Kingdom
- Died: 9 September 1975 (aged 76); Cambridge, United Kingdom
- Resting place: Ashdon, Essex, United Kingdom

Academic background
- Education: Fitzwilliam College (University of Cambridge)
- Doctoral advisor: A. C. Haddon

Sir John Eric Sidney Thompson KBE (31 December 1898 – 9 September 1975) was a leading English Mesoamerican archaeologist, ethnohistorian, and epigrapher. While working in the United States, he dominated Maya studies and particularly the study of the Maya script until well into the 1960s.

== Biography ==
=== Early life ===
Thompson was born on 31 December 1898 to George Thompson, a distinguished surgeon and fellow of the Royal College of Surgeons of England. Thompson was raised in the family home on Harley Street in London. At the age of 14, he was sent to Winchester College to receive an independent education.

In 1915, shortly after the beginning of World War I, Thompson used the assumed name "Neil Winslow" to join the British Army while underage. A year into service, he was wounded and sent home to recover, first in Huddersfield, then in Seaford. He continued to serve in the Coldstream Guards until the end of the war, ending his service as a commissioned officer.

After the war Thompson left for Argentina to work as a gaucho on a family cattle farm. When he returned to England in the early 1920s, he published his first article, on his experience in Argentina, in the diocesan magazine the Southwark Diocesan Gazette: "A Cowboy's Experience: Cattle Branding in the Argentine".

=== Education ===
Thompson first considered a medical or political career. However, he later decided to study anthropology at Fitzwilliam House, Cambridge under A. C. Haddon. With the completion of his degree in 1925 Thompson wrote to Sylvanus Morley, the head of the Carnegie Institution's project at Chichen Itza, to ask for a job, inquiring about a field position. Morley accepted Thompson, most likely due to the fact that Thompson had previously taught himself to read Maya hieroglyphic dates, an accomplishment that was highly valued by Morley who also had a passion for Maya hieroglyphics.

=== Early career ===
In 1926 Thompson arrived in the Yucatan of Mexico under the direction of Morley to work at Chichen Itza. Here he started working on the friezes of the Temple of the Warriors. In his autobiography, Maya Archaeologist (1936), Thompson referred to the friezes as "a sort of giant jigsaw puzzle made worse by the fact the stones had been carved before being placed in position" accurately describing his first field experience.

Later that year Morley sent Thompson to report on the site of Coba, located to the east of Chichen Itza. During the first field season at Coba, Thompson deciphered the dates on the Macanxoc stela. Morley, the foremost epigrapher, did not originally agree with the readings of the dates. It was not until a return trip to Coba that Morley was persuaded by Thompson's readings, marking his emergence as a prominent scholar in the field of Maya epigraphy. Within the next year, Thompson took post as the Assistant Curator at the Field Museum of Natural History in Chicago. He would work there until 1935 when he left for a position at the Carnegie Institution in Washington, D.C.

In 1926, while employed by the Field Museum, Thompson, under the supervision of Thomas A. Joyce and the British Museum, took part in an expedition to Lubaantun in British Honduras. It was the fieldwork at Lubaantun that led Thompson to disagree with Joyce's argument for the early "megalith" and "in-and-out" style of architectural stratigraphy. Thompson argued that the "in-and-out" constructions were due to root action. This root action disturbed the construction by pushing the rocks out in the fashion of the "in-and out" construction that invalidated Joyce's argument.

=== Field work ===
Toward the end of the first season at Lubaantun, the site of Pusilha was discovered and Thompson was sent to investigate with his guide, Faustino Bol. Thompson's subsequent interactions with his guide, who was a Mopan Maya, would later shed light on how Thompson viewed the ancient Maya and their culture. As a result of their long conversations, Thompson concluded that it "was clear that archaeological excavations were not the only means of learning about the ancient ways." This led to his first monograph, Ethnology of the Mayas of Southern and Central British Honduras (1930) which gave insight into the problems of Maya archaeological and epigraphic through the use of ethnographic and ethno-historic data.

In 1931, Thompson and Thomas Gann teamed up to publish The History of the Maya from the Earliest Times to the Present Day. Additionally, Thompson started on a new field project at the site of San Jose in (now) Belize. Here his research was focused at an "average" Maya center in which the stratigraphy produced a ceramic sequence from the Preclassic Period to the Terminal Classic Period. The field report, published in 1939, contained Anna O. Shepard's appendix on the temporal changes in ceramic material, which was the first use of "archaeological sciences".

Thompson was able to produce ceramic sequences at the sites of Tzimin Kax, San Jose, and Xunantunich. These sequences allowed for sites which lacked inscribed monuments traditionally used for dating, to produce a tentative date. The patterns presented by the data from the Petén region and Uaxactun allowed for these sites to fit within the cultural development of the Maya lowlands. In 1938, Thompson added to ceramic sequence, the discovery of the site of La Milpa. This sequence would hold strong until Gordon Willey's research at Barton Ramie, which would lead to a sequence. The field season at La Milpa would be one of the last ones for Thompson, though he was not aware of this at the time of his publication of Maya Archaeologist.

=== Professional career ===
While Thompson continued to publish on chronology, during the 1940s his main goal was to decipher the non-calendric hieroglyphs which composed the majority of the unread texts. Of the eight papers he published in 1943, half were on epigraphic research. Thompson's particular epigraphic focus was on the fish symbol and directional glyphs. Additionally, outside of epigraphy, Thompson investigated tattooing and tobacco use by the ancient Maya.

In The Ancient Maya: The Rise and Fall of a Rainforest Civilization, Arthur Demarest characterizes Thompson as engendering a traditional view of Maya society as essentially one of "gentlemen scholars" of the earlier part of the 20th century. This perspective stemming from an elitist tradition is biased since it presents the Maya myopically. Additionally Thompson presented the Maya as practicing slash and burn agriculture since it fit well into models which presented the Maya as dispersed people. Thompson depicted the Maya public life as being solely centered on "theocratic" ceremonial centers dedicated to worship of great cycles of time and celestial bodies; a view that is now considered an oversimplification. With the help of Dr. A.V. Kidder, Thompson (1943) wrote, A Trial Survey of the Southern Maya Area, describing sites, such as Kaminaljuyui, Miraflores, and Copan. The article by Thompson assumes that the Maya were ultimately "peaceful" people since they lacked apparent defenses. He again stresses the widespread abandonment of ceremonial centers. He refers to the decline in arts and architecture as "Balkanization," a period which he views as experiencing political disintegration. He is also responsible for the long-held belief that the Aztecs, a "highly war-like" society according to the text, were directly involved in overthrowing what he thought were priest-rulers.

Thompson was an accomplished author, publishing text books and findings in academic journals all over the United States. In his article, A Survey of the North Maya Area, Thompson (1945) describes how researchers ought to employ a historical framework in archaeological studies. Additionally he details his finds in the Northern Maya region whilst making suggestions as to which types of ceramics were adopted. He identified phases: the formative period, the Initial Series, transition period, Mexican period, and Mexican absorption period, in Maya development, which set a precedent for the field in a number of ways.

He theorized that the formative period began prior to A.D. 325 and was characterized by monochrome pottery in Chicanel style as well as giant pyramids. However he believed that the Maya did not have any carved stelae during this point in history. (Currently, it is believed that the Preclassic period actually occurred earlier than Thompson originally surmised.) The Initial Series period is presented as the Classic phase in Maya ceramic styles. He grouped them into two halves. The first half, 325 A.D. to 625, is characterized by basal flange bowls, and hieroglyphic stelae and lintels in mostly centralized areas. The second half, 625 A.D. to 900, is indicated by Z fine orange ware, and slate wares. In addition, Puuc, Chenes, and Rio Bec began to develop distinct styles. In the Transition period, 900 A.D. to 987, the Mayanist felt that there were no identifiable pottery types; he remarked on the fall of Chichen Itza, the abandonment of Puuc/Chenes/Rio Bec, and how Mexican influences were becoming stronger. According to Thompson, the Mexican period marked a decline in Maya civilization and ceramic styles due to conflict between Mesoamerican polities. He postulated that this era saw an end to hieroglyphic texts and increased worship of Mexican cosmology in place of Maya deities. The architectural styles were a mix of Tula and Maya features. He also claimed that the Mexican Absorption Period, 1204 A.D. to 1540, was characterized by the abandonment of most major cities, and that artistic innovations only were produced at low levels.

Although Thompson has contributed a considerable amount of research to Mesoamerican studies, some of his interpretations have proven to be flawed, or inconsistent with new investigations. He maintained a venerable air of dissent in the archaeological community. Archaeologist Jeremiah Epstein posed that Thompson was wrong in his characterization of the Maya water transportation. He may have based his analysis on misinterpreted Spanish translations of the Motul Maya word for sail. "Bub" is a 16th-century Spanish interpretation, but may characterize Spanish vessels as opposed to Maya. Sails are not represented in prehistoric Mesoamerican iconography or texts, instead, it is theorized that canoes were used as a primary mode of water transportation for the ancient Maya. In fact, the only place where sails allegedly appear to be represented in prehistoric contexts are in graffiti at Tikal, however, further research poses that the illustration does not depict sails since there is no supplemental evidence of marine life or water sources (191). In addition, Maya numerous texts make no historical references to sails; they may not have been very utilitarian for the Maya, instead, the overwhelming majority of sources refer to canoes. It appears that Thompson did not consider a Post Conquest context for sails.

Another author, Matthew Watson, portrays Thompson as a significant figure in Mesoamerican studies, however, in conjunction with Bruno Latour, the author believes that the famous Mayanist, along with Merle Greene Robertson, and Linda Schele used specific techniques known as "mechanical objectivity" and "trained judgement" which essentially reduces the diversity of Maya artistic traditions to that of modernist texts. This approach ignores a context-driven archaeological empiricism, adding to Thompson's many biased assumptions about how the ancient Maya lived.

Moreover, archaeologist Traci Ardren feels that Thompson appeared to have made the mistake of conflating, or merging several cosmological entities into one. He famously misinterpreted the Maya Moon Goddess Ix Chel, basing his research again on mistranslated Spanish texts. He believed as modern Maya do now that the Moon Goddess is the wife of the Sun God. Ardren's article claims, "Thompson interpreted the different glyphic phrases or names associated with the younger set as various tides for the same goddess, a deity he had already assumed to represent the moon". Ardren recognizes that the concept an all-encompassing, unifying female entity is directly influenced by western philosophical movements and androcentric bias.

In tandem with other critics, Marshall J. Becker (1979) reviews Thompson's assumptions about Classic Maya settlement patterns and social structure and how his influence affected later theories regarding complexity in Mesoamerican culture. His article describes scholars, such as Gann, who critiqued Thompson's work. Gann and Thompson would later coauthor a text in which "Thompson stated...his popularized idea that the Maya lived in small agricultural settlements while the religious centers were uninhabited, while Gann suggested just the opposite. This divergence from the complex model, however, only appeared in Thompson's popular work." Furthermore, Becker characterizes more modern research as integrative, enabling studies to connect emerging insights about Maya urbanization/complexity with supportive archaeological evidence. Becker concludes that Thompson's research was both incomplete and incorrect, however, contemporary research is fighting to correct false claims in conjunction with other disciplines. The article distinguishes between two major theoretical concepts that dominated Maya archaeology for decades; Thompson's "priest-peasant" hypothesis and Borgheyi's concept of ranked social classes. Becker deconstructs Thompson's biased narratives, considering them to be a product of Thompson's English heritage and socio-political orientation which he later projected on to his research. Borgheyi's hypothesis is considered as more indicative of what Maya society might actually be like as opposed to Thompson whose claims were generally viewed as unfounded. Additionally, Becker mentions how defining "limits" often creates interpretive issues for scholars, it is an important observation in a whole range of archaeological settings; still affecting research today.

Unfortunately, Thompson's assumptions about Maya elites were misguided. Husband and wife archaeologist team Chase and Chase discusses the significance of the Caracol Archaeological Project which celebrated its 30th consecutive year of field research in 2014. Their research reveals the inconsistent interpretations of past Mayanists like Thompson. Thompson proposed that the Maya socially organized themselves around a two-tiered class system; a view prescribed by Harvard academic traditions. As of current, Caracol is recognized as being essential to evaluating urbanization and large-scale organization of Maya cities. Representing the Penn State academic tradition, Chase and Chase specifically describe how, upon their initial arrival at the site, two theoretical frameworks supported by Thompson and Borgheyi dominated Caracol, but were later rejected because of evidence stemming from long-term research. The authors found that divisions between elites and lower classes were not as stark or simple as previously suggested; moreover, there is evidence for a prominent middle-class which Thompson did not consider. Ultimately, Thompson did not have access to accurate population estimates or complete maps of settlement patterns, making it difficult for him to assess realistically the organizational principles of the Maya.

Nonetheless, the Mayanist knew the limitations of archaeological research. One of Thompson's later articles "Estimates of Maya Population: Deranging Factors" is an attempt to identify deranging factors for population estimates of the ancient Maya. Determining population sizes is still an issue that plagues archaeologists (214). He drew attention to the ancient Maya tendency to "abandon" a hut after the death of its owner which may invariably skew population estimates. Additionally, Thompson wrote about the mobilizing capabilities of the ancient Maya and their long-standing tradition of moving from site to site in order to exploit local resources. Using the modern Maya as an example, he urged other archaeologists to consider hut-abandonment, and movement as major issues. In fact, determining whether or not a site is continuously occupied is still a huge part of archaeological limits today. Moreover, Thompson contended that house-moving was not a major issue for the Maya since building materials were abundant (215). In his conclusion he felt that mounds also may be an indication of decreased population sizes and a time of "growing unrest."

Thompson's focus on the non-calendric hieroglyphs produced the monumental Carnegie monograph Maya Hieroglyphic Writing: Introduction. Thompson did groundbreaking work in the deciphering of Maya hieroglyphics. Notably, his contributions to the field of Maya epigraphic studies included advancements in our understanding of the calendar and astronomy, the identification of new nouns, and the development of a numerical cataloguing system for the glyphs (the T-number system), which are still used today. His attempted decipherments were based on ideographic rather than linguistic principles, and he was a staunch critic of all attempts to propose phonetic readings. In his later years, he resisted the notion that the glyphs have a phonetic component, as put forward by Russian linguist Yuri Knorozov. Thompson forcefully criticised Knorozov's research, which discouraged the majority of the field from taking the latter's work seriously.

Thompson wrote about hieroglyphic writing in great detail. In Systems of Hieroglyphic Writing in Middle America and Methods of Deciphering Them, the famed Mayanist critiqued some of the historical inconsistencies associated with Diego de Landa's informants. He warned other archaeologists that the translation may be inaccurate since the informant through personal agency may have intentionally deceived the Spaniards or the informant did not supply material for reading Maya texts using syllabic systems because "none existed" at the time. He also scathingly claimed that Knorozov overwhelmingly misidentified Landa's hieroglyphs, adding to confusion. However it was later proven that many of Knorozov's speculations that the Maya language was phonetic and ideographic were accurate. Further discussed are the Nahuatl language and writing where he again asserted that the Maya did not have a phonetic language system; instead, he thought they only identified specific places and people (352). He thought that their writing had strong implications between good and bad. Furthermore, he characterized the preconquest Mexican codices as having a form of "rebus" writing (352-353). Thompson also expressed interest in the "divinatory" significance of the Dresden and Madrid codices (357).

Thompson supported Morley's contention that the inscriptions were purely esoteric and religious texts, with no elements of history or politics, until the early 1960s, when the work of Tatiana Proskouriakoff on the inscriptions of Piedras Negras made him realise that his view had been "completely mistaken."

Thompson continued to work with epigraphic and ethnohistoric problems until the end of his career. As he himself noted, he belonged to the last generation of "generalists", engaging in activities ranging from finding and mapping new sites and excavation to the study of Maya ceramics, art, iconography, epigraphy, and ethnology (on the side). Thompson sought to present the Maya to the general public with publications such as the Rise and fall of the Maya Civilization (1954) and Maya Hieroglyphs without Tears (1972).

=== Post-professional life ===
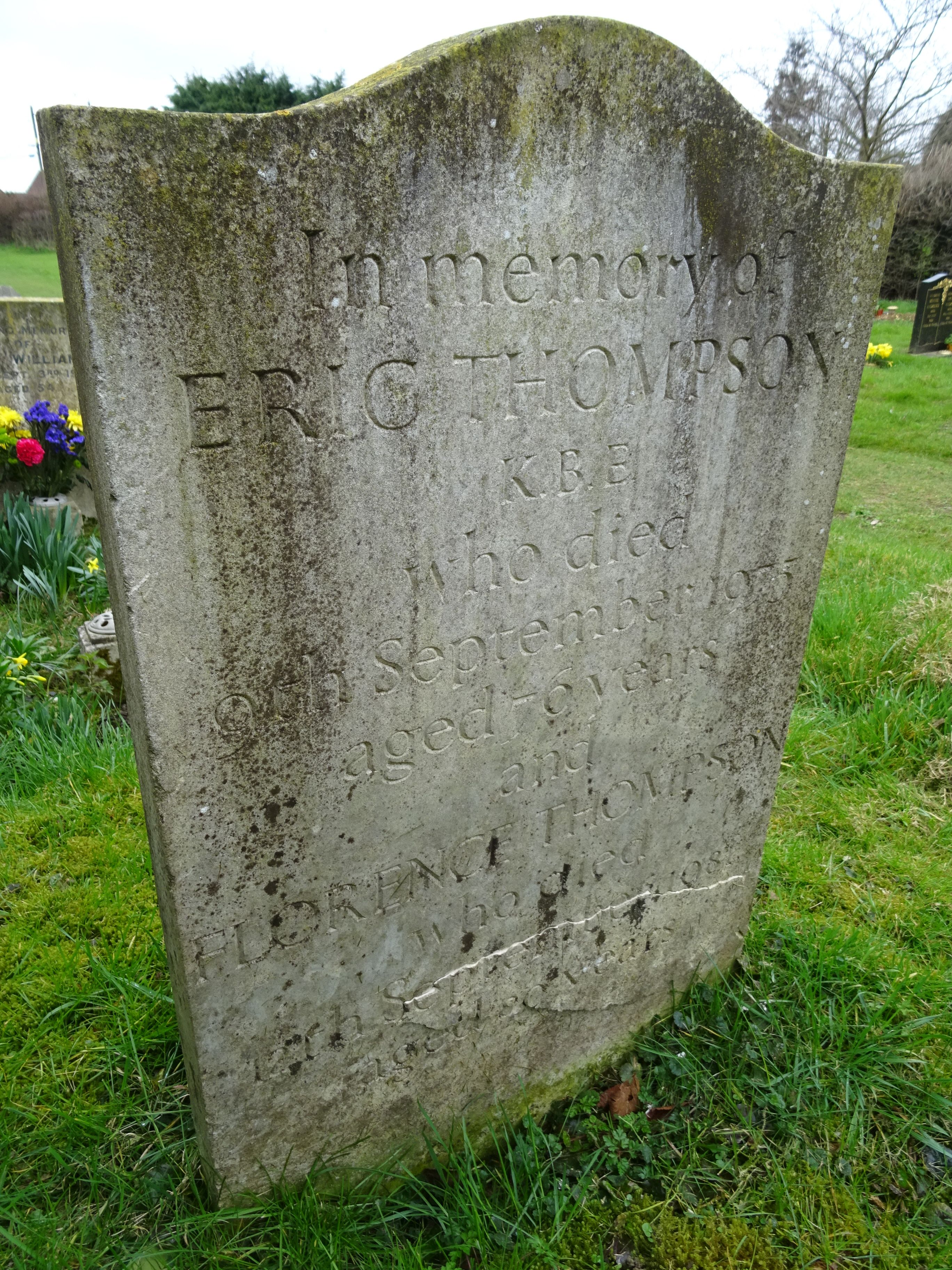
Thompson's grave at Ashdon, Essex.

Thompson was awarded four honorary doctorates in three different countries, along with being awarded the Order of Isabel la Catolica by Spain, the Aztec Eagle by Mexico in 1965 and the Order of the Quetzal by Guatemala during his last trip to the Maya lands with the Queen of the United Kingdom in 1975. Thompson was knighted by Queen Elizabeth II in 1975 a few days after his 76th birthday, becoming the first New World archaeologist to receive this honoured distinction. He died nine months later on 9 September 1975 in Cambridge, and was laid to rest in Ashdon, Essex, England.

== See also ==
- Madrid Codex (Maya)
- Yuri Knorozov
- Tatiana Proskouriakoff
- Maya civilisation
- Chichen Itza
- David Stuart (Mayanist)
