= Relación de las cosas de Yucatán =

Spanish manuscript, written circa 1566

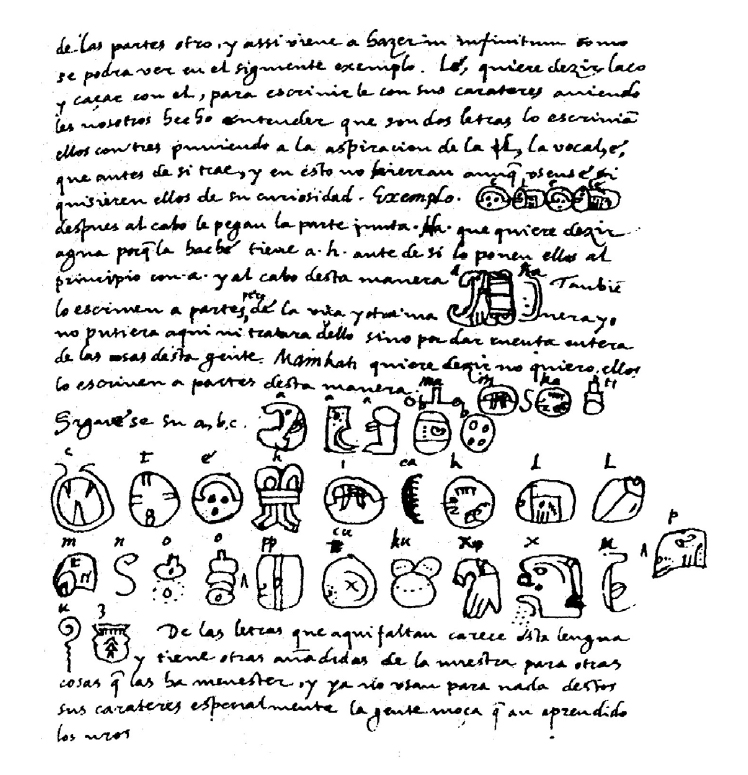
De Landa alphabet

Relación de las cosas de Yucatán was written by Diego de Landa around 1566, shortly after his return from Yucatán to Spain. In it, de Landa catalogues Mayan words and phrases as well as a small number of Maya hieroglyphs. The hieroglyphs, sometimes referred to as the de Landa alphabet, proved vital to modern attempts to decipher the script. The book also includes documentation of Maya religion and the Maya peoples' culture in general. It was written with the help of local Maya princes. It contains, at the end of a long list of Spanish words with Maya translations, a Maya phrase, famously found to mean "I do not want to." The original manuscript has been lost, but many copies still survive.

The first published edition was produced by Charles Etienne Brasseur de Boubourg in 1864 under the title Relation des choses de Yucatan de Diego de Landa. Texte espagnol et traduction française en regard comprenant les signes du calendrier et de l’alphabet hiéroglyphique de la langue maya accompagné de documents divers historiques et chronologiques, avec un grammaire et un vocabulaire abrégés français-maya précédés d’un Essai sur les sources de l’histoire primitive du Mexique et de l’Amérique centrale, Etc., d’après les monuments égyptiens et de l’histoire primitive de l’Égypte d’après les monuments américains. Colonialist scholar John Woodruff has suggested that one passage in particular stands out as the principal basis for the belief that late post-classic Maya had numerous written books:

"These people also used special characters or letters with which they recorded in their books their histories and knowledge, as well as figures, and particular signs in those figures explained it all, and lent it meaning and understanding. We found a great number of books containing such letters, and as they did not contain an iota in which there was not superstition and falsehoods of the devil, we burned them all, which dismayed and distressed them greatly."

Currently-available English translations include William E. Gates's 1937 translation, has been published by multiple publishing houses, under the title Yucatan Before and After the Conquest: The Maya. Alfred Tozzer of Peabody Museum of Archaeology and Ethnology has also published a translation of the work from the Cambridge University Press in 1941.

== See also ==
- Yuri Knorozov
- John Lloyd Stephens
- Books and Writing Were Uncommon

== Bibliography ==
- An Interpretation of Bishop Diego De Landa's Maya Alphabet, by Marshall Durbin (Philological and documentary studies, vol. 2, no. 4, pp. 171 179).
- Woodruff, John M. (6 October 2012). "(Re)writing (Hi)story". Debunking The Maya Myth: Reassessing The Doomsday Prophecy". Valdosta State University Arts and Sciences Lecture Series.
- de Landa, Diego, Relación de las Cosas de Yucatán (PDF).
