= An Outline Dictionary of Maya Glyphs =

Book by William E. Gates

- Title page for An Outline Dictionary of Maya Glyphs (1978 reprint edition)
- Author: William E. Gates
- Language: English
- Subject: Maya script
- Publisher: Johns Hopkins Press
- Publication date: 1931
- Publication place: United States

An Outline Dictionary of Maya Glyphs: With a Concordance and Analysis of Their Relationships is a monograph study of the Maya script by William E. Gates, first published in 1931. The inventory of glyphs used in Gates' analysis was compiled and drawn from the Madrid, Dresden and Paris codices, rather than from monumental inscriptions and stelae. It was published at a time when the Maya script remained wholly undeciphered and the type of writing system the script represented was unknown and much debated among Mayanists. Gates' work represented one of the major attempts in this pre-decipherment era of Mayanist scholarship to catalogue and analyse Maya glyphs as a prelude to uncovering their meaning. In comprehensiveness it was later superseded by Günther Zimmermann's Die Hieroglyphen der Maya-Handschriften (1956), and then in particular by J. Eric S. Thompson's A Catalogue of Maya Hieroglyphs (1962), which became established as the de facto standard catalogue and analysis of its day.

Once it was realised in the latter half of the 20th century that the Maya script was largely logosyllabic in nature, Mayanist epigraphers beginning with Yuri Knorozov began a process of breakthroughs in the script's decipherment. Other key contributions and realisations—such as establishing that the stelae texts recorded actual history and real personages and events—led to the decipherment of a significant number of glyphs and texts, particularly from the 1970s onwards. While many of the interpretations put forward in the early catalogues by Gates et al. have been made redundant by the modern knowledge of the script, catalogues such as Gates' have retained their significance and utility as references and records—particularly for calendrical and astronomical data and interpretation.

The original edition was limited to 207 copies. The book was subsequently reprinted by Dover in 1978, and by Kessinger in 2003.
