= Libellus de Medicinalibus Indorum Herbis =

Aztec herbal manuscript of 1552

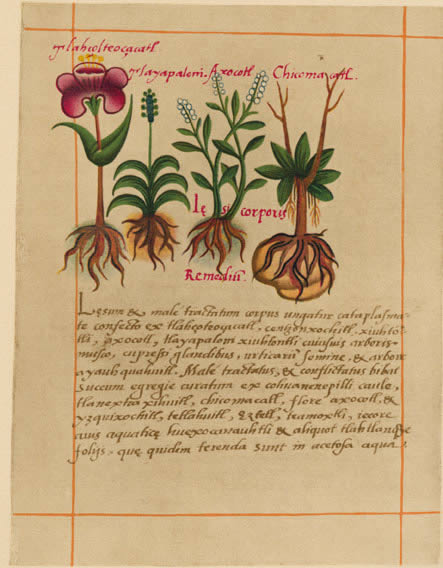
A page of the Libellus illustrating the tlahçolteoçacatl, tlayapaloni, axocotl and chicomacatl plants, used to make a remedy for lęsum & male tractatum corpus, "injured and badly treated body"

The Libellus de Medicinalibus Indorum Herbis (Latin for "Little Book of the Medicinal Herbs of the Indians") is an Aztec herbal manuscript, describing the medicinal properties of 250 plants used by the Aztecs. It was translated into Latin by Juan Badiano, from a Nahuatl original composed in the Colegio de Santa Cruz de Tlatelolco in 1552 by Martín de la Cruz that is no longer existent. The Libellus is also known as the Badianus Manuscript, after the translator; the Codex de la Cruz-Badiano, after both the original author and translator; and the Codex Barberini, after Cardinal Francesco Barberini, who had possession of the manuscript in the early 17th century.

The Badianus Manuscript of 1552 is the first illustrated and descriptive scientific text of Nahua medicine and botany produced in the Americas. It is a significant text in the history of botany and the history of medicine.

== History ==
In 1552 Jacobo de Grado, the friar in charge of the Convent of Tlatelolco and the College of Santa Cruz, had the herbal created and translated for Don Francisco de Mendoza, son of Don Antonio de Mendoza, the viceroy of New Spain. Mendoza sent the Latin manuscript to Spain, where it was deposited into the royal library. There it presumably remained until the early 17th century, when it somehow came into the possession of Diego de Cortavila y Sanabria, pharmacist to King Philip IV. From Cortavila it travelled to the Italian Cardinal Francesco Barberini, possibly via intermediate owners. The manuscript remained in the Barberini library until 1902, when the Barberini library became part of the Vatican Library, and the manuscript along with it. Finally, in 1990 — over four centuries after it was sent to Spain — Pope John Paul II returned the Libellus to Mexico, and it is now in the library of the National Institute of Anthropology and History in Mexico City.

A copy was made in the 17th century by Cassiano dal Pozzo, the secretary of Cardinal Barberini. Dal Pozzo's collection, called his Museo Cartaceo ("Papers Museum"), was sold by his heirs to Pope Clement XI, who sold it to his nephew, Cardinal Alessandro Albani, who himself sold it to King George III in 1762. Dal Pozzo's copy is now part of the Royal Library, Windsor. Another copy may have been made by Francesco de' Stelluti, but is now lost. Dal Pozzo and de' Stelluti were both members of the Accademia dei Lincei.

There are several published editions of the manuscript, beginning with the one by William E. Gates in 1939, now reissued in an inexpensive edition by Dover Books. Gates acquired photographs of the manuscript in Latin and water color renderings of the botanical drawings. He published both the original Latin manuscript as well as his translation to English. The reissued edition of Gates's manuscript has a very useful introduction by Bruce Byland, recounting the publication history of the manuscript and subsequent scholarship.

At the same time Gates was working on this publication, another was being prepared for publication by Emily Walcott Emmart. This resulted in a full-color facsimile publication, transcription, and translation to English, with notes and commentary. In 1964, an edition of the manuscript was published in full-color facsimile, with a translation of the Latin to Spanish.

The manuscript has been mainly studied by scholars interested in history of medicine and history of botany. In history of medicine, there has been some focus on the extent to which the manuscript might be incorporating aspects of European humoral theories of medicine or whether text is purely from the Nahua viewpoint. According to a study by Bernard R. Ortiz de Montellano, the Badianus herbal was prepared for the king of Spain to demonstrate the intellectual sophistication of the Nahuas which might have skewed the manuscript to emulating aspects of European culture.

The botanical aspects of the manuscript are significant, showing that the Nahuas had a classification system that was indeed highly sophisticated. As with Book 11, "The Earthly Things" of the Florentine Codex by Franciscan Bernardino de Sahagún, the Badianus manuscript gives the Nahuatl names of plants, an illustration of the example, and the uses for the plant. However, unlike the Florentine Codex, there is little emphasis on supernatural healing characteristics of the plants. The examples in the Badianus manuscript deal solely with the medical conditions and curative aspects of the plants. For example, in the Gates translation, subject headings for plants' curative powers include "Against stupidity of the mind," [against] "Goaty armpits of sick people," "Against lassitude," "Medicine to take away foul and fetid breath." For scholars interested in women's health, the Badianus manuscript has a whole chapter on "remedies for recent parturition, the menses, lotion of the internal parts, childbirth, tubercules of the breasts, [and] medicine for increasing milk flow." Various plants listed in the Badianus manuscript have psychoactive properties, examined by anthropologist Peter Furst.

== Modern editions ==
Several modern editions of the Libellus have been published since the 20th century. An English translation by William Gates appeared in 1939, followed by others including Emily Walcott Emmart and Henry E. Sigerist. A critical edition and Spanish translation by Francisco Guerra was published in Mexico in 2000.

In 2021, the Instituto Nacional de Antropología e Historia (INAH) published a digitized and annotated edition of the Libellus, including a paleographic transcription, Spanish translation, and scholarly commentary.

A fully edited print version of the same project was released in 2023 by INAH in Mexico City, under the title Libellus de medicinalibus indorum herbis / Códice De la Cruz-Badiano.

== Proposed connection with the Voynich Manuscript ==
In 2014, Arthur Tucker and Rexford Talbert published a paper claiming that some of the plant illustrations in the Voynich Manuscript match plant illustrations from the Libellus de Medicinalibus Indorum Herbis, suggesting that the Voynich Manuscript originated in the New World. This analysis has been criticized by noted Voynich Manuscript researchers, who suggest it is just a coincidence, as any large set of fictitious plant illustrations is bound to have several that resemble real plants.

== Translations ==
| Year | Language | Title | Translator | Publisher |
|---|---|---|---|---|
| 1939 | English | The De la Cruz-Badiano Aztec Herbal of 1552 | William Gates | The Maya Society |
| 1940 | English | The Badianus Manuscript (Codex Barberini Latin 241): An Aztec Herbal of 1552 | Emily Walcott Emmart | The Johns Hopkins Press |
| 1952 | Spanish | Libellus de Medicinalibus Indorum Herbis: El manuscrito pictórico mexicano-latino de Martín de la Cruz y Juan Badiano de 1552 | Francisco Guerra | Editorial Vargas Rea y El Diario Español |
| 1964, 1991 | Spanish | Libellus de medicinalibus indorum herbis: Manuscrito Azteca de 1552: versión Española con estudios y comentarios por diversos autores (ISBN 968-16-3607-4) | | Instituto Mexicano del Seguro Social |
| 2000 | English | An Aztec Herbal: The Classic Codex of 1552 (ISBN 0-486-41130-3) | William Gates | Dover (republication of 1939 edition) |

== See also ==
- Aztec entheogenic complex
