= T-number =

T-number or T number may refer to:

- A numerical system for the glyphs within the Pre-Columbian Mayan script, see J. Eric S. Thompson.
- Dvorak technique, a system to subjectively estimate tropical cyclone intensity
- Viral capsid T-number, a system to describe the icosahedral surface quasi-symmetry pattern
- In music, the transposition of a tone row
- In number theory, a transcendental number having finite, but unbounded, transcendence measure.
- T-number (photography), a transmission aperture value in photography
