= Pivdenne =

Pivdenne is a toponym (place name) in Ukraine that means 'southern'. It may refer to:

== Cities ==
- Pivdenne, Kharkiv Oblast
- Pivdenne, Odesa Oblast

== Rural settlements ==
- Pivdenne, Dnipropetrovsk Oblast
- Pivdenne, Donetsk Oblast

== Facilities and structures ==
- KB Pivdenne, a rocket and satellite designer
