= Pivdenne, Kharkiv Oblast =

City in Kharkiv Oblast, Ukraine

Pivdenne Південне
- City
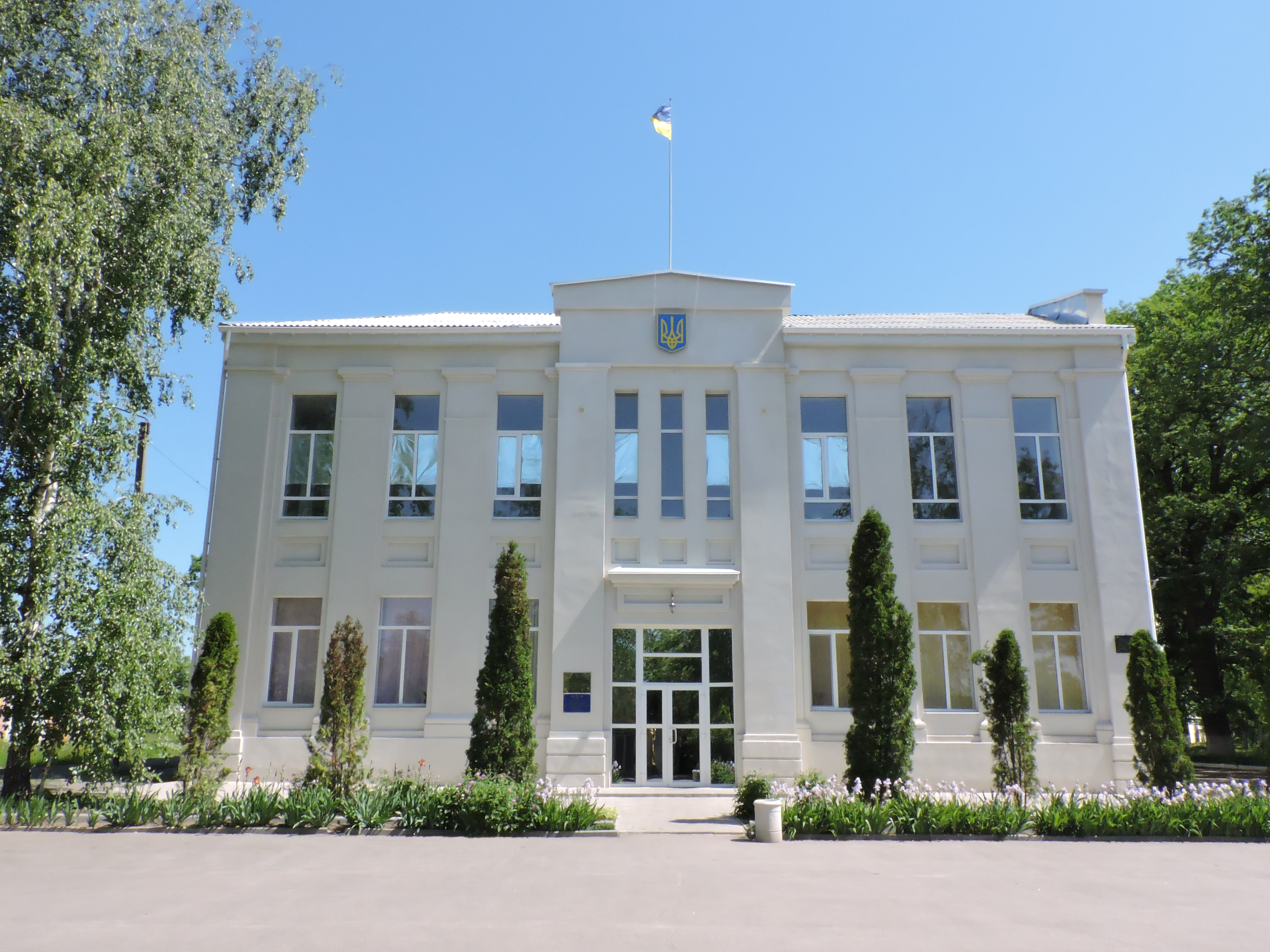
- Pivdenne Town Hall

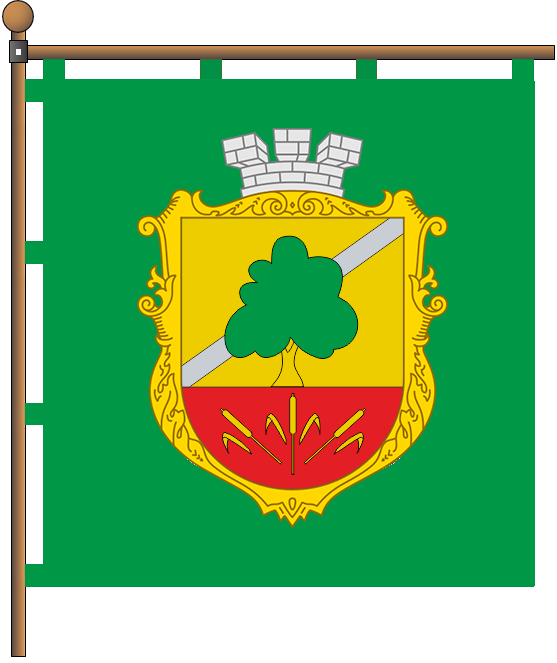
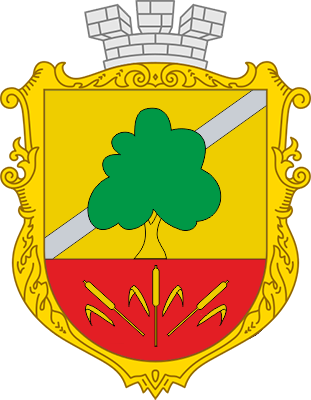
- Flag Coat of arms
- Interactive map of Pivdenne
- Location within Kharkiv Oblast Location within Ukraine
- Coordinates: 49°53′N 36°04′E
- Country: Ukraine
- Oblast: Kharkiv Oblast
- Raion: Kharkiv Raion
- Hromada: Pivdenne urban hromada

Population (2001)
  - Total: 8,516
- Time zone: UTC+2 (EET)
  - Summer (DST): UTC+3 (EEST)

Pivdenne (Ukrainian: Південне; Russian: Пивденное) is a small city in Kharkiv Raion, Kharkiv Oblast, in eastern Ukraine. It hosts the administration of Pivdenne urban hromada. Population: 7,319 (2022 estimate). It is located in the historic region of Sloboda Ukraine.

== Geography ==
The city of Pivdenne lies on the left bank of the Merefa River, upstream at a distance of 1.5 km is the village of Budy, downstream it borders the city of Merefa. The city is located southeast of Kharkiv. Several railway branches run nearby, the stops of Pivdenne and Komarivka.

In orographic terms, the city of Pivdenne is located on the southeastern spurs of the Central Russian Upland. Height above sea level: 181 m.

The hydrographic network belongs to the Seversky Donets basin. The vegetation of the territory is typical forest-steppe. Chernozems dominate.

The climate is moderately continental, with cold winters and hot summers. Most precipitation falls in summer.

== History ==
The settlement was founded on 13 (26) August 1906 for workers of the Southern Railway. It was originally named Yuzhny (Russian: Южный, lit. 'southern'). In 1963, the urban-type settlements of Komarivka and Pivdenne were merged into the city of Pivdenne.

=== Russo-Ukrainian War ===
On 28 February 2022, during the Russian invasion of Ukraine, the mayor of the city, Bryukhanov O.M., was detained on suspicion of treason. One of his deputies, the head of the local district department, and a police inspector were also detained.

== Demographics ==
The ethnic composition of the population according to the 2001 census was 79.63% Ukrainian, 18.65% Russian. The distribution of the population by native language according to the 2001 census was as follows: 61.57% - Ukrainian, 37.71% - Russian.

== Notable residents ==
The linguist Yuri Knorozov, who played a key role in the decipherment of the Maya script, grew up in Yuzhny. He lived in a house built by his father on Karl Marx Street.
