= Santa Rita, Corozal =

Ruined Mayan city in Belize

Santa Rita
- Location within Mesoamerica Location within Belize
- 18°24′8″N 88°23′42″W
- Periods: Preclassic to Postclassic
- Cultures: Maya civilization
- Location: Corozal Town, Corozal District, Belize
- Region: Corozal District

Site notes
- Archaeologists: Thomas Gann, Arlen F. Chase and Diane Zaino Chase

Santa Rita is a Maya ruin and an archaeological reserve on the outskirts of Corozal, Belize. Historical evidence suggests that it was probably the ancient and important Maya city known as Chetumal.

== Early history ==
Evidence excavated at Santa Rita exhibits a long history of inhabitance. The discovery of a burial site containing very early pottery has dated the formation of the city between 2000 and 1200 BCE. Its importance peaked during the Postclassic era, and continued to be occupied even after the arrival of the Spanish.

Because of its location, the city at Santa Rita once controlled nearby trade routes between the coast and the mouths of two major rivers, the Río Hondo and Río Nuevo. These rivers served as major arteries of trade to centres in the interior such as Lamanai and those in El Petén. Because of this, it became the dominant settlement in the Chetumal region during the early Classic period.

After a short decline during the Late Classic period, Santa Rita once again rose to prominence. Following the decline of Classic sites to the north, Chactemal (also known as Chetumal in some sources) became the capital of the Chetumal Province, one of the 19 Maya states later recorded by the invading Spanish. Chetumal formed part of the confederation of states under the Cocom dynasty of Mayapán. It remained under this alliance until 1441, when Mayapán supremacy was overthrown by an uprising.

=== Preclassic Period ===
The earliest indication of inhabitants at Santa Rita Corozal is dated to the Preclassic Period (1200-900 BCE). They lived upon a high bluff in the southwest area that overlooks Corozal Bay. Four burials were discovered with ceramics and shell jewelry dating from the Preclassic period. This early preclassic period had a small estimated population of 150. According to archaeological evidence, the middle preclassic period did not have an increase in population. The population appears to have grown in the Late Preclassic period. Twelve locations were identified as Late Preclassic sites. Thirty-four burials were found in these twelve locations. Included in the burials was Sierra Red pottery, which is found all over the Maya Lowlands. The population was thought to be in the region of 1,000 people. The Protoclassic period, which is the temporal period between the Late Preclassic and Early Classic periods, is estimated by archaeologists to have increased in population again. Four burials have been dated to this time period.

=== Classic Period ===
The Early Classic period had 1,500 residents who lived in a village that was much different than the earlier periods. Monuments were constructed and trades item were found, indicating that trade was increasing. Thirteen burials found from this time period indicate that an extensive social hierarchy was in place. Three of those thirteen burials were found in Structure 7, they had extravagant items not find in the other burials. Structure 7 is the tallest building at Santa Rita Corozal. One of these burials, which is dated to 450 A.D. contained what is thought to be a powerful ruler of Santa Rita Corozal. He was interred with items associated with the burial offerings of higher-ranked citizens.

At this Early Classic time period, a distinct social structure had developed. The wealth found at the burials is thought to be due to trade along the rivers that border Santa Rita Corozal-the New River and the Rio Hondo. The Late Classic period is found throughout the site. It is estimated that by 750 A.D. nearly 2,500 residents were living at the site. Artifacts found throughout the site indicate that a large portion of the population had access to most items. The social hierarchy of the early Classic period had vanished.

=== Postclassic period ===
The excavations that lead to the discovery of Preclassic and Classic materials and burials were originally looking for information on Postclassic material. Thomas Gann's discovery of Postclassic murals, and excavations at Santa Rita Corozal would eventually lead researchers to Santa Rita Corozal in search of the Postclassic Maya. In 1979, a research project was developed to bring better understanding of the Postclassical Maya. It sought to identify the archaeological history of Santa Rita Corozal, to understand the origins and ending of the Postclassical period, and to comprehend the ritual, social and politics of the Late Postclassic period. At the time of its origin the Postclassic Maya were seen as a declining society that had abandoned its rituals, cities and were a shadow of their former splendor. Santa Rita Corozal did not decline into obscurity, quite the opposite occurred. Large buildings were not erected, but low lying buildings were constructed. By the Late Postclassic period Santa Rita Corozal had its highest number of inhabitants. The population at 1300-1539 CE was estimated to be at 6,900 residents. Excavations were undertaken in 1985, in the south central area of Santa Rita Corozal. Nine buildings were found that were constructed in the Postclassic period. Most of them were built over earlier buildings. The artifacts found in two structures, Structures 183 and 213, both contained figure artifacts. Structure 213 contained 25 figures that were placed in the ground prior to its construction. Nine of the figures were put into a ceramic urn with the remaining sixteen figurines surrounding it. Structure 183 contained 28 figurines that were placed into a ceramic urn in front of an altar.

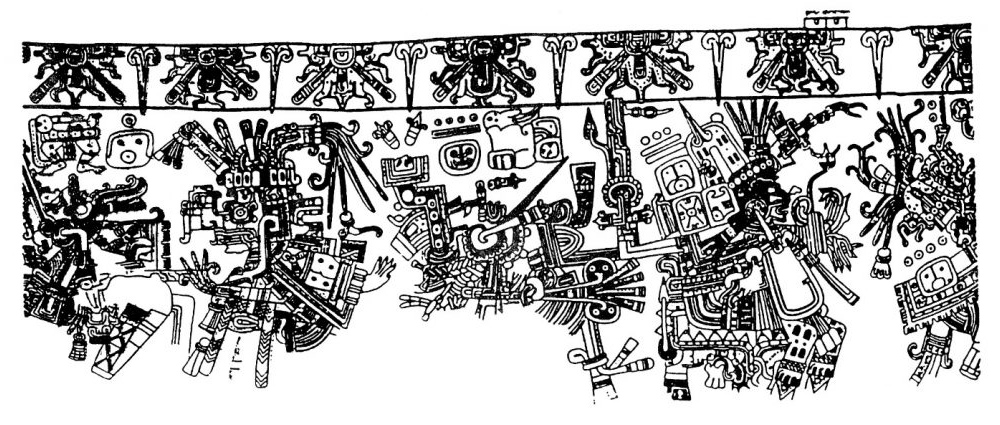
Drawing of one of the Santa Rita murals by Thomas Gann (1900)

== Excavation ==
The modern town of Corozal was founded in 1848 by refugees from the Caste War in neighbouring Yucatán, and expanded steadily making it the major ethnicity in the country at the time. The ruins of Santa Rita became a target for building resources; the mounds of the site made convenient road fill and the stones were used for structure foundations. Because of this, the exact borders of the ancient Maya city may never be known.

In the early 1900s, amateur archaeologist Thomas Gann visited the site and discovered a Mixtec-influenced mural; these do not survive, but copies made by Gann do. No substantial research followed this until the Corozal Postclassic Project, led by Arlen F. Chase and Diane Zaino Chase, carried out a series of excavations between 1979 and 1985.

Little structural evidence remains from the Postclassic era. The only existing structure at the ruins dates from the Classic era. The centre of this building has been described as a ceremonial chamber, with a complex series of interconnected passages leading to other rooms, including two burial chambers. One contained the remains an elderly woman surrounded with jewellery and pottery; the other was that of a warlord, evident from the artefacts found buried with him — a ceremonial flint representing leadership and a stingray spine most used in blood-letting rituals. Both burials date from around 500 CE.

According to a Belize government guide at the site in December 2016, Thomas Gann was there primarily looking for gold. He used explosives to blow the top off of the pyramid, leaving the stunted version visible today.

Artifacts found dating from the Postclassic era reveal that religious rituals like blood-letting, which were very important during the Classic era, continued to play an important role. The presence of items of Aztec origin, also dating from the Postclassic period, attest to the continuing trade importance of Santa Rita several hundred years after the decline of the major ceremonial centres of the interior.
