= Exponi nobis =

1522 papal bull by Adrian VI

Exponi nobis nuper fecisti, known in New Spain as Omnimoda, was a papal bull commissioned by Charles V and promulgated by Adrian VI on 10 May 1522. The bull allowed members of mendicant orders in the New World to exercise "almost all episcopal authority" when no diocesan bishop was within two days' travel. These powers were later confirmed at the Council of Trent.

Under the authority of Omnimoda, missionary priests such as Martín de Valencia and Diego de Landa acted as agents of the Inquisition in the Americas. The bull also gave missionaries the authority to dispense local Catholics from impediments to marriage.
