= Galina Yershova =

Soviet and Russian academic

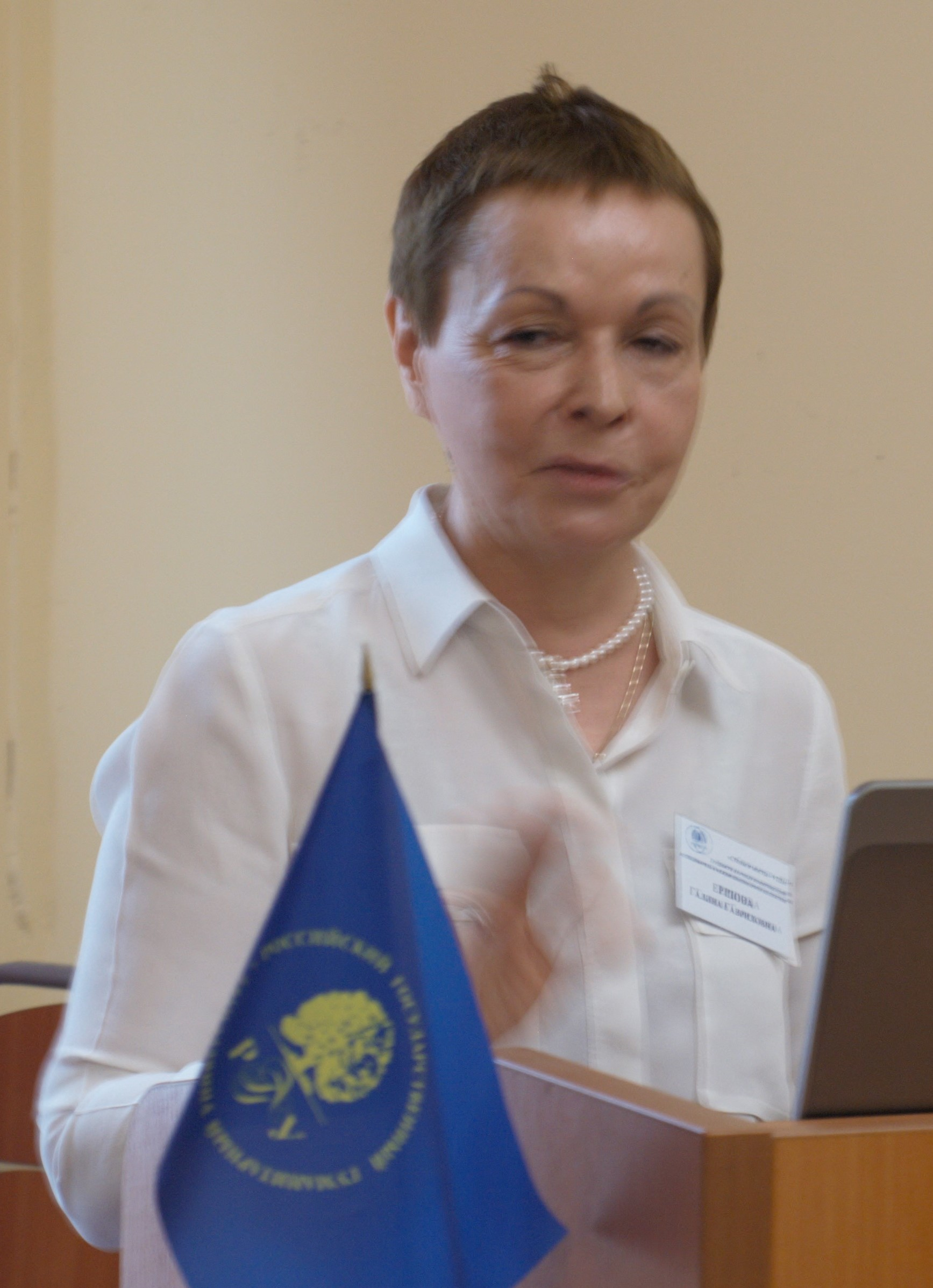
Shown in 2019

Galina Gavrilovna Yershova (also Ershova; Russian: Галина Гавриловна Ершова; born 17 March 1955, Moscow) is a Russian academic historian, linguist, and epigrapher, who specialises in the study of the ancient civilisations, cultures, and languages of the New World. As an Americanist scholar, her area of expertise is in the field of Mesoamerican studies, and in particular that of the pre-Columbian Maya civilisation, its historical literature, and its writing system. Yershova is a former student and protégé of the Russian linguist and epigrapher Yuri Knorozov, renowned for his central contributions towards the decipherment of the Maya script.

As of 2008, Yershova is a senior fellow at the Russian Academy of Sciences' Institute of Archaeology at the Russian State University for the Humanities (RGGU), and director of the RGGU's Centre for Mesoamerican Research. She has authored approximately two hundred papers in scientific, art, and literature publications, including some eight monographs on Maya writing, history, and archaeoastronomy.
