= Juan Badiano =

Juan Badiano (1484-after 1552) was the translator of Libellus de Medicinalibus Indorum Herbis ca. 1552, from Nahuatl to Latin. The book was a compendium of 250 medicinal herbs used by the Aztecs. This compilation was originally done by Martin de la Cruz (another Indian who was baptised with this Christian name). This catalogue is a historic document, since it shows the Aztec's advancements in medicine. Badiano was born in Xochimilco, Mexico, and taught Latin in the school of Tlatelolco, where he attended with Martin de la Cruz and proved to be an outstanding student.
