= Arlen F. Chase =

Mesoamerican archaeologist

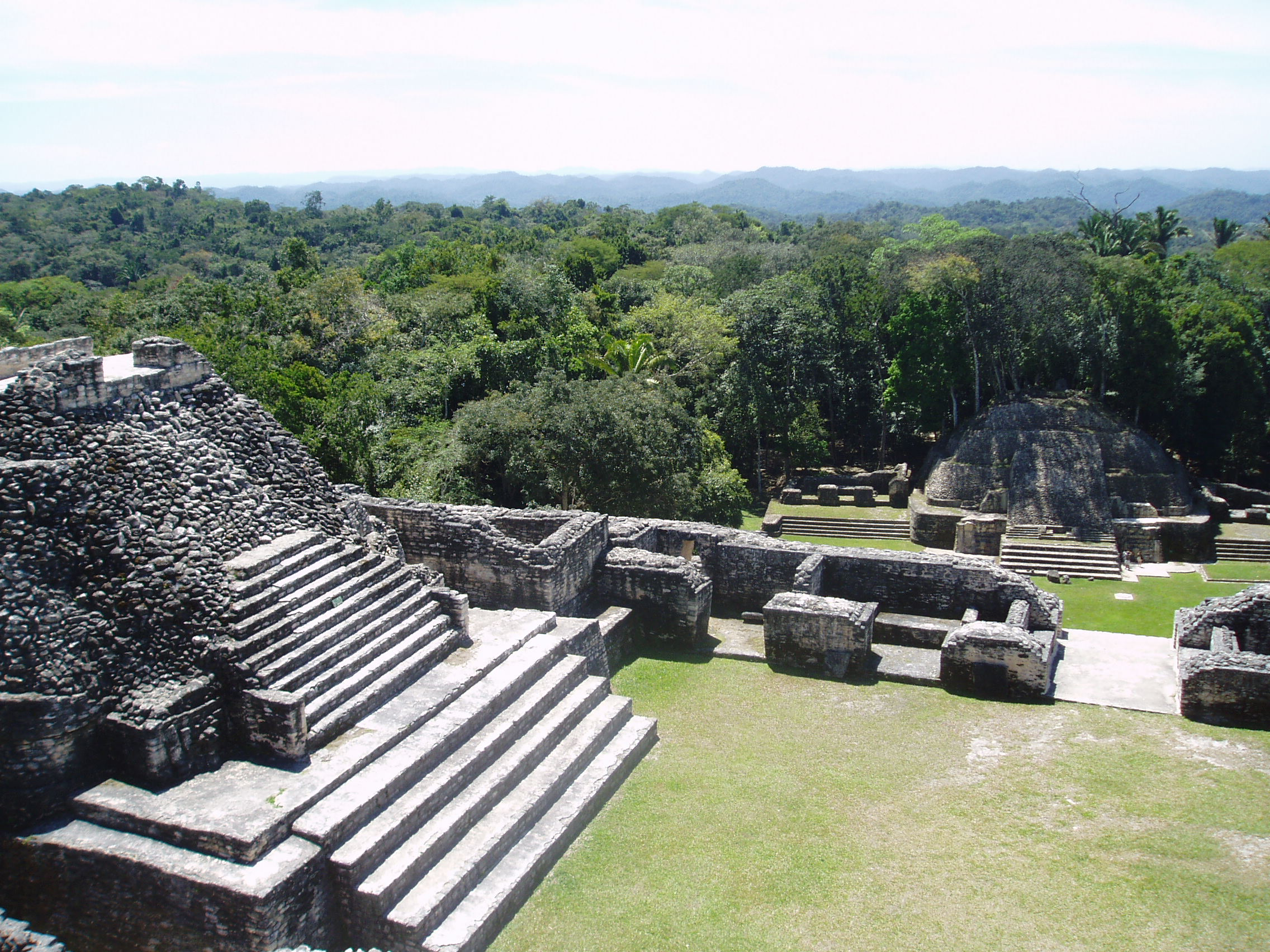
Aerial view of Maya civilization ruins at Caracol in Belize, curated by Chase since 1985

Arlen F. Chase (born 1953) is a Mesoamerican archaeologist and a faculty member in the Department of Comparative Cultural Studies at the University of Houston. Previously, he was a professor in the anthropology department at Pomona College, Claremont, CA and before that the University of Nevada, Las Vegas. He previously served a variety of administrative roles (Departmental Chair for Anthropology; Associate Dean for the College of Sciences) at the University of Central Florida over the course of his 32 year stay at that institution. He is noted for his long-term research at the ancient Maya city of Caracol, Belize and for exploring landscape traces of Maya civilization using lidar.

== Biography ==
Chase took his BA and PhD in Anthropology at the University of Pennsylvania, and then worked in the University of Pennsylvania's advising office and anthropology department. After excavating at Grasshopper Pueblo in the American Southwest, his Mesoamerican fieldwork began with research stays at the site of Tancah in Mexico and at Ixtutz, Yaxha, and Tayasal in Guatemala. He carried out early excavations in the Motagua Valley and at Quirigua in Guatemala before moving to Belize to carry out investigations at Nolmul and in the Orange Walk. From 1979 through 1985, he co-directed archaeological excavations at Santa Rita, Corozal with his wife Diane Z. Chase. In 1985, with his wife, he started the Caracol Archaeological Project in western Belize, which is still ongoing. The Chases have undertaken extensive excavations at this large Maya city, defining a sequence from the Preclassic through the Terminal Classic for Caracol and from the Preclassic through the Historic Periods for Santa Rita, Corozal. At Caracol, they have also worked to preserve the built structures in the urban complex as part of Belize's cultural heritage.

Chase moved to the University of Central Florida in 1984 and was there through 2016. He helped to transform that institution into one of the top American universities in the study of the Southern Lowland Maya. He and his wife have together published many peer-reviewed articles and books on the subjects of hieroglyphics, settlement patterns, ancient cities and urbanism, and ceramic studies of the Maya.

In 2016, he joined the anthropology department at the University of Nevada, Las Vegas (UNLV).

In 2019, he began teaching at Pomona College.

In 2023, he began teaching at the University of Houston.

== Current research ==
Chase teamed with University of Central Florida biologist Dr John Weishampel to obtain a NASA Space Archaeology Program & UCF-UF Space Research Initiative grant to use lidar (light radar) sensors to detect changes in the rainforest canopy, reforestation patterns and modifications to archaeological sites. The lidar system was installed in an aircraft flown over Caracol. The system used laser beams that were projected to the ground, bounced back and were recorded. These recordings produced a detailed three dimension map of both the Forest canopy and the ruins of Caracol. The speed and precision of the system was far superior to traditional ground surveys. In a 2013 talk at the University of Minnesota, Arlen and Diane Chase talked about their most recent work at Caracol, including data generated by lidar.

== Honors ==
- 2017 Presenters Excellence Award: 15 Years (2003-2017). Belize Archaeology Symposium.
- 2013-2015 Distinguished Lecturer for Sigma Xi.
- 2012 Named a Fellow of the American Association for the Advancement of Science.
- 2006-2008 Member, Board of Governors, State University System of Florida (Chair, Advisory Council of Faculty Senates).
- 2008 The Ben and Trudy Termini Distinguished Anthropologist Lecture, University of Texas, Arlington.
- 2007 Awarded the status of Pegasus Professor, UCF‟s highest faculty honor, for continued excellence inresearch, teaching, and service.
- 2007 Inducted into Phi Kappa Phi honor society.
- 1995–present Co-Beneficiary (with Diane Z. Chase) of the Trevor Colbourn Endowment (University of Central Florida).
- 1991 Samuel Kahn Distinguished Alumnus Award, Robert Louis Stevenson School, Pebble Beach, CA.

== Bibliography ==
- 1985 Arlen F. Chase and Prudence M. Rice, Editors., The Lowland Maya Postclassic, University of Texas Press, Austin, 352pp.+viii
- 2010 Arlen F. Chase, Diane Z. Chase, and John F. Weishampel, "Lasers in the Jungle: Airborne sensors reveal a vast Maya landscape." Archaeology 63(4):27-29.

== Articles ==
- 2010 Weishampel, John F., Arlen F. Chase, Diane Z. Chase, Jason B. Drake, Ramesh L. Shrestha, K. Clint Slatton, Jaime J. Awe, Jessica Hightower, and James Angelo, "Remote Sensing of Ancient Maya Land Use Features at Caracol, Belize related to Tropical Rainforest Structure," in S. Campna, M. Forte, and C. Liuzza, Eds., Space, Time, Place: Third International Conference on Remote Sensing in Archaeology, pp. 45–52, British Archaeological Reports S2118, Archaeopress, Oxford, England.
- 2010 "A City Revealed.", Prism, American Society for Engineering Education, September 2010, pg. 21.
- 2010 "Ils l'ont fait Une Cité Maya Cartographiée en Relief", Science & Vie, Juillet 2010, pg. 13.
- 2008 Arlen F. Chase and Diane Z. Chase, "Methodological Issues in the Archaeological Identification of the Terminal Classic and Postclassic Transition in the Maya Area," Research Reports in Belizean Archaeology 5:23-36.
- 1985 Arlen F. Chase and Diane Z. Chase, "Postclassic Temporal and Spatial Frames for the Lowland Maya: A Background," in A. Chase and P. Rice, Eds., The Lowland Maya Postclassic, pp. 9–22, University of Texas Press, Austin.
- 1993 John Nobel Wilford, "Mayans had a Middle Class, Too, Emerging Burial Artifacts Indicate.", New York Times, Jan 5. 1993.
- 1989 Epstein, Nadine, "From a Remote Jungle Site, a Trail of Striking Clues.", The Smithsonian, Vol 20(9): pp 99–113.

== Referenced articles ==
- 2001 Arlen F. Chase and Diane Z. Chase, "Caracol," in W. Fash, Ed., The Oxford Encyclopedia of Mesoamerican Cultures, Vol. 1, pp. 143–145, Oxford University Press.

== Peer reviewed articles ==
- 2012 Arlen F. Chase, Diane Z. Chase, Christopher T. Fisher, Stephen J. Leisz, and John F. Weishampel, “Geospatial Revolution and Remote Sensing LiDAR in Mesoamerican Archaeology,” Proceedings of the National Academy of Sciences 109(32): 12916-2921.
- 2010 "Status and Power: Fiction and Reality in the Classic Maya World," 8th Annual Belize Archaeology Symposium, San Ignacio Cayo, Belize (with D.Z. Chase – July).
- 2010 "Airborne LiDAR and Maya Landscape Archaeology: Viewing Status and Power from a Distance," 8th Annual Belize Archaeology Symposium, San Ignacio Cayo, Belize (D.Z. Chase, A.F. Chase, J. Awe, and J.F. Weishampel – July).
- 2010 "Relationships between LiDAR-Derived Rainforest Canopy Structure and Ancient Maya Land Use Legacies around Caracol, Belize," 25th Annual Meeting of the U.S. International Association of Landscape Ecology, Athens, Georgia (J.F. Weishampel, J.N. Hightower, J.J. Angelo, A. Matos, A.F. Chase, and D.Z. Chase - April).
- 2009 "Remote Sensing of Ancient Maya Land Use Features at Caracol, Belize Related to Tropical Rainforest Structure," 3rd International Conference on Remote Sensing, Tiruchirapalli, Tamil Nadu, India (J.F.Weishampel, A.F. Chase, D.Z. Chase, J.B. Drake, R.L. Shrestha, K.C. Slatton, J.J. Awe, J. Hightower, J. Angelo – August).
- 2008 "Elites, Symbolic Production, and Economic Distribution at Caracol, Belize," 73rd Annual Meeting of the Society for American Archaeology, Vancouver, Canada (with D.Z. Chase – March).
