= De Landa alphabet =

Attempt to interpret Maya script as an alphabetic script

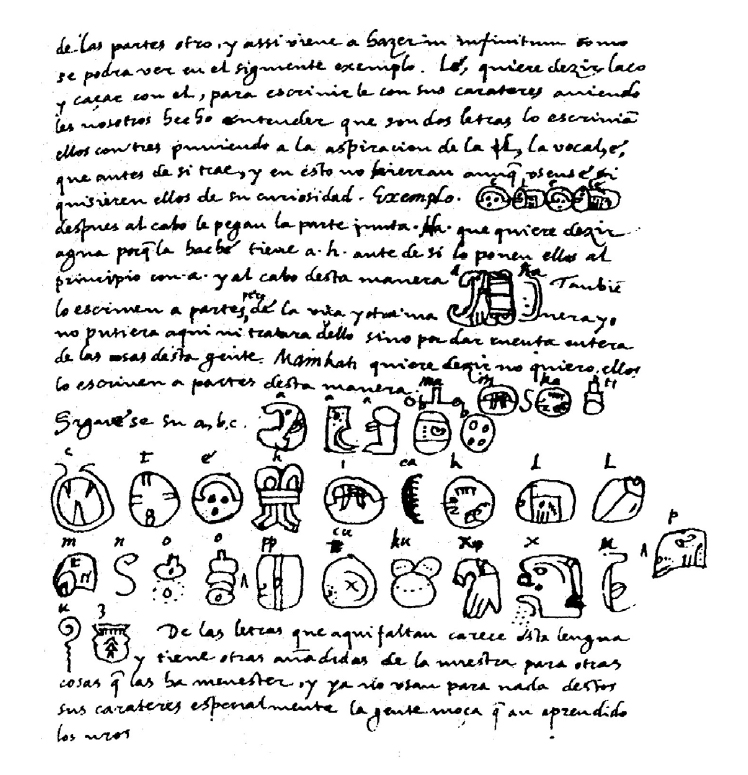
Reproduction of the page from Diego de Landa's Relación de las cosas de Yucatán, which gives a purported correspondence between letters of the Spanish alphabet and Maya glyphs, and which has become known as the de Landa alphabet

The de Landa alphabet is the correspondence of Spanish letters and glyphs written in the pre-Columbian Maya script, which the 16th-century bishop of Yucatán, Diego de Landa, recorded as part of his documentation of the Maya civilization. Despite its inaccuracies, the information provided by him would much later prove to be crucial to the mid-20th century breakthrough in the decipherment of the Maya script, starting with the work of the Soviet epigrapher and Mayanist Yuri Knorozov.

== History ==
With the aid of two Maya informants familiar with the script, de Landa made an attempt to provide a transcribed "A, B, C" for the Maya script with the intent of providing a key to its decipherment and translation. The "alphabet", along with some passages of explanatory notes and examples of its use in Maya writing, was written as a small part of de Landa's Relación de las cosas de Yucatán ("Account of the matters of Yucatán"), which also documented many aspects of the culture and practices of the indigenous Maya peoples that he had seen and been told of when he was living among them in the Yucatán Peninsula. His work was written after he had been recalled to Spain to face trial by Inquisition for allegations of improper behaviour while there, and he wrote it as a defense of his mission there. The work was soon thereafter almost forgotten.

The pre-existing establishments, such as the Mayan religious order, were all destroyed by invading Spanish belligerents, such as De Landa, to make way for Christian “enlightenment”. In furtherance of this goal, nearly all the Mayan texts were destroyed, in deference to writings that conformed to Biblical doctrine.

=== Rediscovery ===
Lost to scholarship for several centuries, an abridged copy of Relación de las cosas de Yucatán was later rediscovered by the French antiquarian scholar Brasseur de Bourbourg in the 19th century. Then a number of unsuccessful attempts were made to use its de Landa alphabet passages to decipher the unknown script because the De Landa script was an alphabet, but the extant Maya texts are logosyllabic. It has been theorized that De Landa might have unwittingly created a spurious writing system by a fundamental lack of understanding of how logosyllabic writing systems function as well as by tenuous access to reliable sources. It was not until the early 1950s when Knorozov published his landmark paper, analyzing it and other inscriptions in a new light, that substantial progress began to be made.
