= Diego de Landa =

Spanish Catholic bishop in colonial Mexico (1524–1579)

Most Reverend Diego de Landa
- Bishop of Yucatán
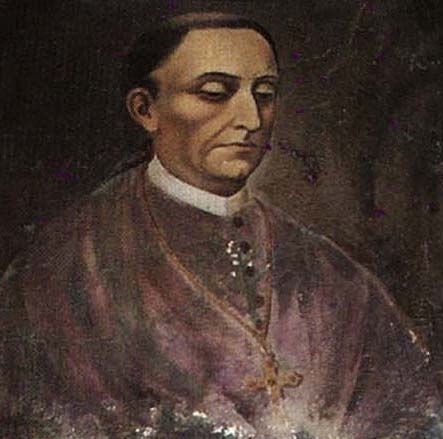
- Church: Catholic Church
- Archdiocese: Archdiocese of Yucatán
- Diocese: Diocese of Yucatán
- Predecessor: Francisco de Toral
- Successor: Gregorio de Montalvo Olivera

Orders
- Consecration: 1573 by Cristóbal Rojas Sandoval

Personal details
- Born: November 12, 1524 Cifuentes, Alcarria, Spain
- Died: April 29, 1579 (aged 54) Yucatán

Diego de Landa Calderón, O.F.M. (12 November 1524 – 29 April 1579) was a Spanish Franciscan bishop of the Roman Catholic Archdiocese of Yucatán. He led a campaign against idolatry and human sacrifice. In doing so, he burned Maya manuscripts (codices) which contained knowledge of Maya religion and civilization, and the history of the American continent. Ironically, however, his work in documenting and researching the Maya was indispensable in achieving the current understanding of their culture, to the degree that Mayanist William Gates asserted that "ninety-nine percent of what we today know of the Mayas, we know as the result either of what Landa has told us in the pages that follow, or have learned in the use and study of what he told". Gates also noted that "it is an equally safe statement that... he burned ninety-nine times as much knowledge of Maya history and sciences as he has given us".

== Conversion of Maya ==
Born in Cifuentes, Guadalajara, Spain, he became a Franciscan friar in 1541, and was sent as one of the first Franciscans to the Yucatán, arriving in 1549. Landa was in charge of bringing the Roman Catholic faith to the Maya peoples after the Spanish conquest of Yucatán. He presided over a spiritual monopoly granted to the Catholic Franciscan order by the Spanish crown, and he worked diligently to buttress the order's power and convert the indigenous Maya. His initial appointment was to the mission of San Antonio in Izamal, which served also as his primary residence while in Yucatán.

He is the author of the Relación de las cosas de Yucatán in which he catalogues the Maya religion, Maya language, culture and writing system. The manuscript was written around 1566 on his return to Spain; however, the original copies have long since been lost. The account is known only as an abridgement, which in turn had undergone several iterations by various copyists. The extant version was produced around 1660, lost to scholarship for over two centuries and not rediscovered until the 19th century. In 1862, French cleric Charles Etienne Brasseur de Bourbourg published the manuscript in a bilingual French-Spanish edition, Relation des choses de Yucatán de Diego de Landa.

== Inquisition ==
=== Suppression of Maya and destruction of Maya texts ===
After hearing of Roman Catholic Maya who continued to practice idol worship, Landa ordered an Inquisition in Mani, ending with a ceremony called auto de fé. During the ceremony on July 12, 1562, a disputed number of Maya codices (according to Landa, 27 books) and approximately 5,000 alleged Maya cult images were burned. Only three pre-Columbian books of Maya hieroglyphics (also known as a codex) and fragments of a fourth are known to have survived. Collectively, the works are known as the Maya codices.

Landa's Inquisition involved the use of physical abuse on certain indigenous Maya. Scores of Maya nobles were jailed pending interrogation, and large numbers of Maya nobles and commoners were subjected to examination under "hoisting". During hoisting, a victim's hands were bound and looped over an extended line that was then raised until the victim's entire body was suspended in the air. Often, stone weights were added to the ankles or lashes applied to the back during interrogation. During his later trial for his actions, Landa vehemently denied that any deaths or injuries directly resulted from these procedures.

=== Justifications ===
Scholars have argued that Mexican inquisitions showed little concern to eradicate magic or convict individuals for heterodox beliefs, and that witchcraft was treated more as a religious problem capable of being resolved by confession and absolution. Perhaps inspired by intolerant fellow Franciscan Cardinal Cisneros from the same Toledo convent, Landa was "monomaniacal in his fervor" against it. Landa believed a huge underground network of apostasies, led by displaced indigenous priests, were jealous of the power the Church enjoyed and sought to reclaim it for themselves. The apostates, Landa surmised, had launched a counteroffensive against the Church, and he believed it was his duty to expose the evil before it could revert the population to their old heathen ways. Landa claimed that he had discovered evidence of human sacrifice and other idolatrous practices while rooting out native idolatry. Although one of the alleged victims of said sacrifices, Mani Encomendero Dasbatés, was later found to be alive, and Landa's enemies contested his right to run an inquisition, Landa insisted a papal bull, Exponi nobis, justified his actions.

However, Lopez de Cogolludo, Landa's chief Franciscan biographer, wrote of Landa's firsthand experiences with human sacrifices. When Landa first came to the Yucatán, he made it his mission to walk the breadth of the peninsula and preach to the most remote villages. While passing through Cupules, he came upon a group of 300 about to sacrifice a young boy. Enraged, Landa stormed through the crowd, released the boy, smashed the idols and began preaching with such zeal and sincerity that they begged him to remain in the land and teach them more.

Landa was unique in that he was willing to go into recently conquered, where native resentment of Spaniards was still very intense. Over the course of his journeys, Landa formulated an intimate contact with natives. Natives placed him in such an esteemed position they were willing to show him some of their sacred writings that had been transcribed on deerskin books. To Landa and the other Franciscan friars, the very existence of these Maya codices was proof of diabolical practices. In references to the books, Landa said:

We found a large number of books in these characters and, as they contained nothing in which were not to be seen as superstition and lies of the devil, we burned them all, which they (the Maya) regretted to an amazing degree, and which caused them much affliction.

The original can be found in section XLI of Landa's Relación de las cosas de Yucatán.

Landa's insistence of widespread cults throughout the Yucatán is backed by ample evidence. Rituals the Spanish conquerors could not understand were labeled as idolatry, superstition, or even devil worship. Landa, like most other Franciscans, subscribed to millenarian ideas, which demanded the mass conversion of as many souls as possible before the turn of the century. Eliminating evil and pagan practices, Landa believed, would usher the Second Coming of Christ much sooner.

Landa's Relación De Las Cosas De Yucatán is about as complete a treatment of Maya religion as is ever likely. While controversy surrounds his use of force in the conversion process, few scholars would debate the general accuracy of his recordings. Allen Wells calls his work an "ethnographic masterpiece", and William J. Folan, Laraine A. Fletcher and Ellen R. Kintz have written that the account of Maya social organization and towns before conquest is a "gem". The writings are the main contemporary source for Maya history, without which the knowledge of Maya ethnology would be devastatingly small. Much more would now be known about Mayan history and culture if de Landa had not burned anywhere from 27 to what Mayan Historian George Stuart speculates as "hundreds, maybe thousands of [Maya] books. We will never know."

== Consecrated as bishop ==
Landa was sent back to Spain by Bishop Toral, to stand trial for conducting an illegal Inquisition. His actions were strongly condemned before the Council of the Indies. That resulted in a "committee of doctors" being commissioned to investigate Landa's alleged crimes. In 1569, the committee absolved Landa of his crimes. Bishop Toral died in Mexico in 1571, allowing King Philip II of Spain to appoint Landa as the second bishop of Yucatán.

== Landa and contemporary Mayanist studies ==
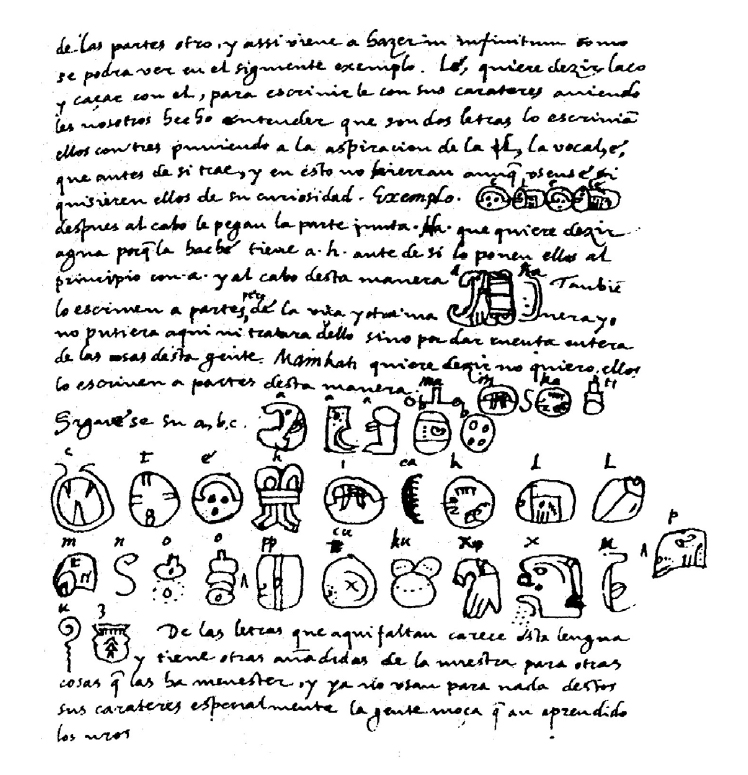
Image of the page from Relación de las Cosas de Yucatán in which Landa describes his Maya alphabet, which was to prove instrumental in the mid-20th-century breakthrough in Maya hieroglyphics decipherment

Landa's Relación de las cosas de Yucatán also created a valuable record of the Maya writing system, which, despite its inaccuracies, was later to prove instrumental in the decipherment of the writing system. Landa asked his informants (his primary sources were two Maya individuals descended from a ruling Maya dynasty who were literate in the script) to write down the glyphic symbols corresponding to each of the letters of the (Spanish) alphabet, in the belief that there ought to be a one-to-one correspondence between them. The results were faithfully reproduced by Landa in his later account, but he recognised that the set contained apparent inconsistencies and duplicates that he was unable to explain. Later researchers reviewing this material also formed the view that the "de Landa alphabet" was inaccurate or fanciful, and many subsequent attempts to use the transcription remained unconvincing. It was not until much later, in the mid-20th century, when it was realized and then confirmed that it was not a transcription of an alphabet, as Landa and others had originally supposed, but was rather a syllabary. That was confirmed only by the work of Soviet linguist Yuri Knorozov in the 1950s and the succeeding generation of Mayanists.

== Sources ==
- Clendinnen, Inga (2003). Ambivalent Conquests: Maya and Spaniard in Yucatan, 1517–1570 (2nd ed.). Cambridge University Press. ISBN 978-0-521-52731-6.
- Durbin, Marshall E. (1969). An interpretation of Bishop Diego de Landa's Maya alphabet. New Orleans: Middle American Research Institute, Tulane University. OCLC 1136497.
- Diego de Landa; William Gates (1978). Yucatan Before and After the Conquest (PDF). Dover Publications. ISBN 978-0-486-23622-3. Archived from the original (PDF) on 2019-04-12.

== See also ==
- Relación de las cosas de Yucatán
