= Yuri Knorozov =

Soviet and Russian linguist (1922–1999)

- Юрий Кнорозов
- Knorozov with Asya, his Siamese cat
- Born: Yuri Valentinovich Knorozov; 19 November 1922; Kharkov, Ukrainian SSR
- Died: 30 March 1999 (aged 76); Saint Petersburg, Russia
- Citizenship: Soviet Union (until 1991); Russia (from 1991)
- Known for: Decipherment of Maya script

Academic background
- Education: Moscow State University

Academic work
- Discipline: Linguist; epigraphist; ethnologist
- Institutions: Institute of Anthropology and Ethnography
- Notable students: Galina Yershova

Yuri Valentinovich Knorozov (Russian: Юрий Валентинович Кнорозов; 19 November 1922 – 30 March 1999) was a Soviet and Russian linguist, epigraphist, and ethnologist. He is best known for the key role he played in the decipherment of the Maya script, the writing system of the Maya civilization of pre-Columbian Mesoamerica.

== Early life ==
Knorozov was born in Kharkov on 19 November 1922. His parents were Russian intellectuals who had moved from Saint Petersburg to Kharkov in 1911 for work purposes. His father had built a house for the family in the village of Yuzhny (later known as Pivdenne), but his mother decided it would be better to give birth in Kharkov, where there were doctors and hospitals. His paternal grandmother, Zabel (1858–1926), was a stage actress of national repute in Armenia.

Growing up in Yuzhny, Knorozov developed a close affinity with cats, which was to last his whole life. At school, he was a difficult and somewhat eccentric student, who made indifferent progress in a number of subjects and was almost expelled for poor and willful behavior. Aged five, he sustained a heavy injury to his head that nearly left him blind. However, it became clear that he was academically bright with an inquisitive temperament; he was an accomplished violinist, wrote romantic poetry and could draw with accuracy and attention to detail. His scores were excellent for all subjects, except for Ukrainian language and literature.

In 1940, at the age of 17, Knorozov left Kharkov for Moscow where he commenced undergraduate studies in the newly created Department of Ethnology at Moscow State University's department of History. He initially specialised in Egyptology.

== Military service and the "Berlin Affair" ==
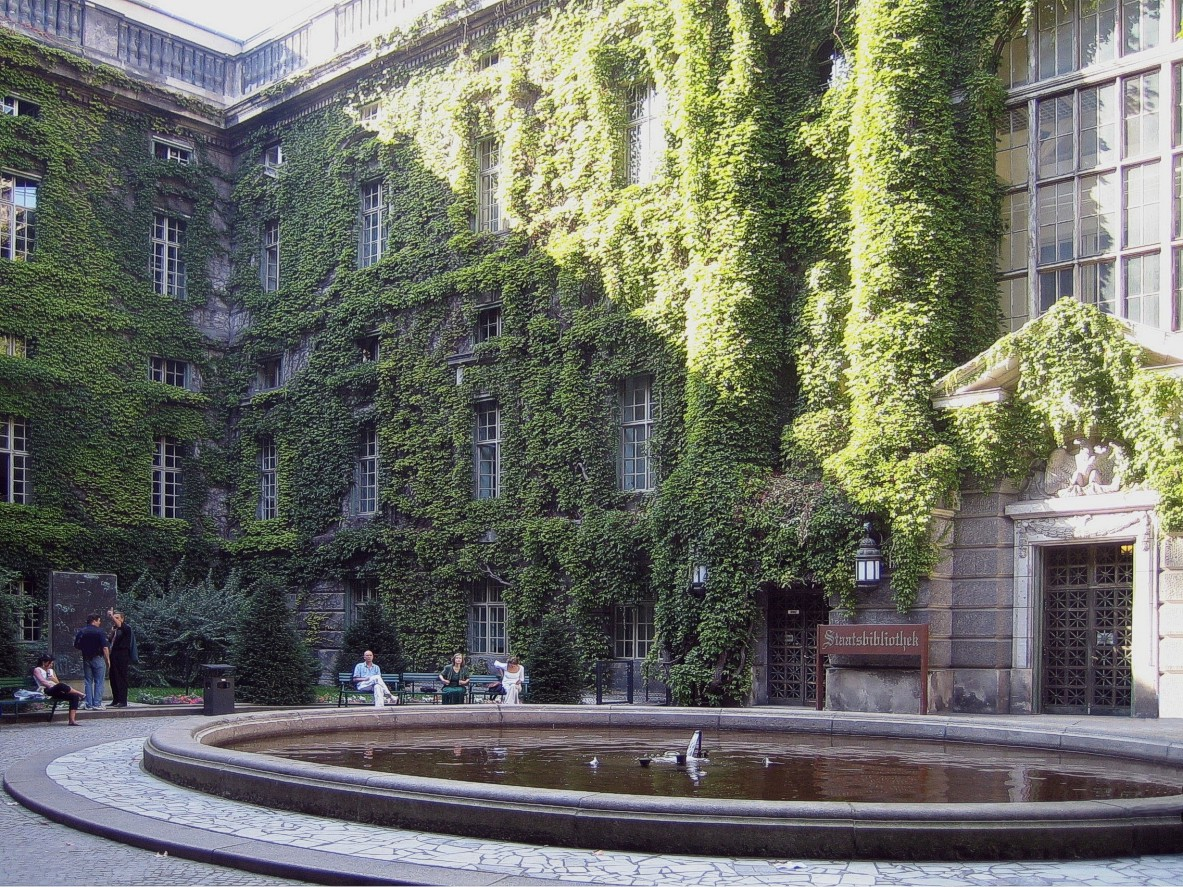
Inner courtyard of the Preußische Staatsbibliothek (2005)

Knorozov's study plans were soon interrupted by the outbreak of World War II hostilities along the Eastern Front in mid-1941. Due to his poor health, Knorozov was unfit for regular military service in the Soviet Army; however, he and his family spent most of 1941–1943 years in German-occupied territories, where he could be forced to support the Nazi war effort. Knorozov managed to avoid that fate by moving from village to village, while earning a living as a school teacher. In 1943, Knorozov survived an outbreak of typhus, and in September of that year managed to escape with his family to Moscow. There he resumed his Egyptology studies, at the Moscow State University. In 1944, he was unexpectedly recalled for a military service, but his father, who was a colonel in the Soviet Army, arranged for him a job as a telephone operator in an artillery unit stationed near Moscow.

According to a popular legend, Knorozov and his unit supported the push of the Red Army vanguard into Berlin. There, Knorozov is supposed to have by chance retrieved a book which would spark his later interest in and association with deciphering the Maya script. The legend has been much reproduced, particularly following the 1992 publication of Michael D. Coe's Breaking the Maya Code. Supposedly, when stationed in Berlin, Knorozov came across the National Library while it was ablaze. Somehow he managed to retrieve from the fire a book, which remarkably enough turned out to be a rare edition containing reproductions of the three Maya codices, the Dresden, Madrid, and Paris codices. Knorozov is said to have taken this book back with him to Moscow at the end of the war, where its examination would form the basis for his later pioneering research into the Maya script.

Although many details of Knorozov's life during the war remained unclear, his student Galina Yershova could not find any evidence that he traveled outside of Moscow Oblast in 1943–1945. Knorozov himself, in an interview conducted a year before his death, denied the Berlin legend. As he explained to the Mayanist epigrapher Harri Kettunen:

"Unfortunately it was a misunderstanding: I told about it [finding books in a library in Berlin] to my colleague Michael Coe, but he didn't get it right. There wasn't any fire in the library. And the books that were in the library, were in boxes to be sent somewhere else. The Germans had packed them, and since they didn't have time to move them anywhere, the boxes were taken to Moscow."

== Resumption of studies ==
Any possible system made by a man can be solved or cracked by a man.

— Yuri Knorozov

In the autumn of 1945 after World War II, Knorozov returned to Moscow State University to complete his undergraduate courses at the department of Ethnography. He resumed his research into Egyptology, and also undertook comparative cultural studies in other fields such as Sinology. He displayed a particular interest and aptitude for the study of ancient languages and writing systems, especially hieroglyphs, and he also read medieval Japanese and Arabic literature. According to his roommate, Sevyan Vainshtein, Knorozov was entirely devoting himself to studies. After receiving a scholarship, he would spend it on books, surviving on meager food until the next scholarship.

While still an undergraduate at MSU, Knorozov found work at the N.N. Miklukho-Maklai Institute of Ethnology and Anthropology (or IEA), part of the prestigious Academy of Sciences of the USSR. Knorozov's later research findings would be published by the IEA under its imprint.

As part of his ethnographic curriculum Knorozov spent several months as a member of a field expedition to the Central Asian Soviet republics of the Uzbek and Turkmen SSRs (what had formerly been the Khorezm PSR, and would much later become the independent nations of Uzbekistan and Turkmenistan following the 1991 breakup of the Soviet Union). On this expedition his ostensible focus was to study the effects of Russian expansionary activities and modern developments upon nomadic ethnic groups, of what was a far-flung frontier world of the Soviet state.

At this point the focus of his research had not yet been drawn on the Maya script. This would change in 1947, when at the instigation of his professor, Knorozov wrote his dissertation on the "de Landa alphabet", a record produced by the 16th century Spanish Bishop Diego de Landa in which he claimed to have transliterated the Spanish alphabet into corresponding Maya hieroglyphs. De Landa, who during his posting to Yucatán had overseen the destruction of all the codices from the Maya civilization he could find, reproduced his alphabet in a work (Relación de las Cosas de Yucatán) intended to justify his actions once he had been placed on trial when recalled to Spain. The original document had disappeared, and this work was unknown until 1860s when an abridged copy was discovered in the archives of the Spanish Royal Academy by the French scholar, Charles Étienne Brasseur de Bourbourg.

Since de Landa's "alphabet" seemed to be contradictory and unclear (e.g., multiple variations were given for some of the letters, and some of the symbols were not known in the surviving inscriptions), previous attempts to use this as a key for deciphering the Maya writing system had not been successful.

== Key research ==
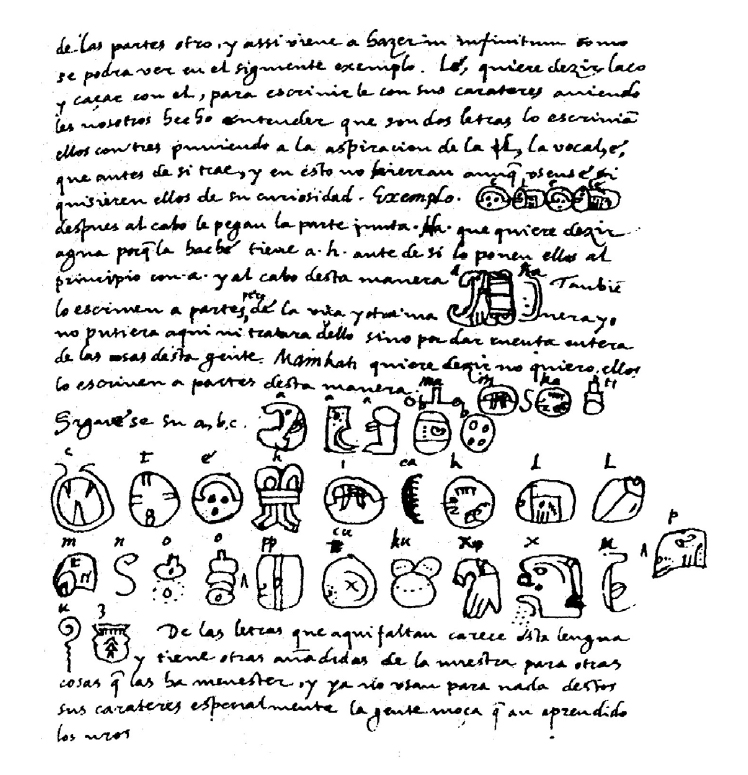
Page from Diego de Landa's Relación de las Cosas de Yucatán (1853 edition by Brasseur de Bourbourg), containing description of the de Landa alphabet which Knorozov relied upon for his breakthrough.

In 1952, the then 30-year-old Knorozov published a paper which was later to prove to be a seminal work in the field (Древняя письменность Центральной Америки, or "Ancient Writing of Central America"). The general thesis of this paper put forward the observation that early scripts such as ancient Egyptian and Cuneiform which were generally or formerly thought to be predominantly logographic or even purely ideographic in nature, in fact contained a significant phonetic component. That is to say, rather than the symbols representing only or mainly whole words or concepts, many symbols in fact represented the sound elements of the language in which they were written, and had alphabetic or syllabic elements as well, which if understood could further their decipherment. By this time, this was largely known and accepted for several of these, such as Egyptian hieroglyphs (the decipherment of which was famously commenced by Jean-François Champollion in 1822 using the tri-lingual Rosetta Stone artefact); however, the prevailing view was that Mayan did not have such features. Knorozov's studies in comparative linguistics drew him to the conclusion that the Mayan script should be no different from the others, and that purely logographic or ideographic scripts did not exist.

Knorozov's key insight was to treat the Maya glyphs represented in de Landa's alphabet not as an alphabet, but rather as a syllabary. He was perhaps not the first to propose a syllabic basis for the script, but his arguments and evidence were the most compelling to date. He maintained that when de Landa commanded his informant to write the equivalent of the Spanish letter "b" (for example), the Maya scribe actually produced the glyph that corresponded to the syllable /be/, as spoken by de Landa. Knorozov did not actually put forward many new transcriptions based on his analysis; nevertheless, he maintained that this approach was the key to understanding the script. In effect, the de Landa "alphabet" was to become almost the "Rosetta stone" of Mayan decipherment.

A further critical principle put forward by Knorozov was that of synharmony. According to this, Mayan words or syllables which had the form consonant-vowel-consonant (CVC) would be represented by two glyphs, each representing a CV syllable (i.e., CV-CV). In reading, the vowel of the second glyph would be ignored, leaving the reading CVC. The principle also stated that the second CV glyph would be one with an echo vowel that matched the vowel of the first glyph. Later analysis has proved this to be largely correct.

== Critical reactions to his work ==
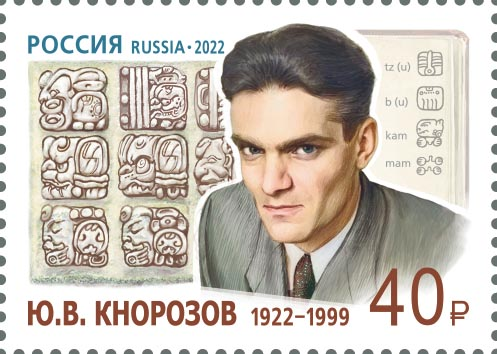
Knorozov on a 2022 Russian stamp

Upon the publication of this work from a then hardly known scholar, Knorozov and his thesis came under some severe and at times dismissive criticism. J. Eric S. Thompson, the noted British scholar regarded by most as the leading Mayanist of his day, led the attack. Thompson's views at that time were solidly anti-phonetic, and his own large body of detailed research had already fleshed-out a view that the Maya inscriptions did not record their actual history, and that the glyphs were founded on ideographic principles. His view was the prevailing one in the field, and many other scholars followed suit.

According to Michael Coe, "during Thompson's lifetime, it was a rare Maya scholar who dared to contradict" him on the value of Knorozov's contributions or on most other questions. As a result, decipherment of Maya scripts took much longer than their Egyptian or Hittite counterparts and could only take off after Thompson's death in 1975.

== Progress of decipherment ==
Knorozov further improved his decipherment technique in his 1963 monograph "The Writing of the Maya Indians", and published translations of Mayan manuscripts in his 1975 work "Maya Hieroglyphic Manuscripts".

During the 1960s, other Mayanists and researchers began to expand upon Knorozov's ideas. Their further field-work and examination of the extant inscriptions began to indicate that actual Maya history was recorded in the stelae inscriptions, and not just calendric and astronomical information. The Russian-born but American-resident scholar Tatiana Proskouriakoff was foremost in this work, eventually convincing Thompson and other doubters that historical events were recorded in the script.

Other early supporters of the phonetic approach championed by Knorozov included Michael D. Coe and David Kelley, and whilst initially they were in a clear minority, more and more supporters came to this view as further evidence and research progressed.

Through the rest of the decade and into the next, Proskouriakoff and others continued to develop the theme, and using Knorozov's results and other approaches began to piece together some decipherments of the script. A major breakthrough came during the first round table or Mesa Redonda conference at the Maya site of Palenque in 1973, when using the syllabic approach those present (mostly) deciphered what turned out to be a list of former rulers of that particular Maya city-state.

Subsequent decades saw many further advances, making a significant portion of surviving inscriptions legible. Most accounts of Mayan linguistics credit Knorozov's breakthroughs in deciphering the Mayan language. In retrospect, Prof. Coe writes that "Yuri Knorozov, a man who was far removed from the Western scientific establishment and who, prior to the late 1980s, never saw a Mayan ruin nor touch[ed] a real Mayan inscription, had nevertheless, against all odds, made possible the modern decipherment of Maya hieroglyphic writing."

== Later life ==
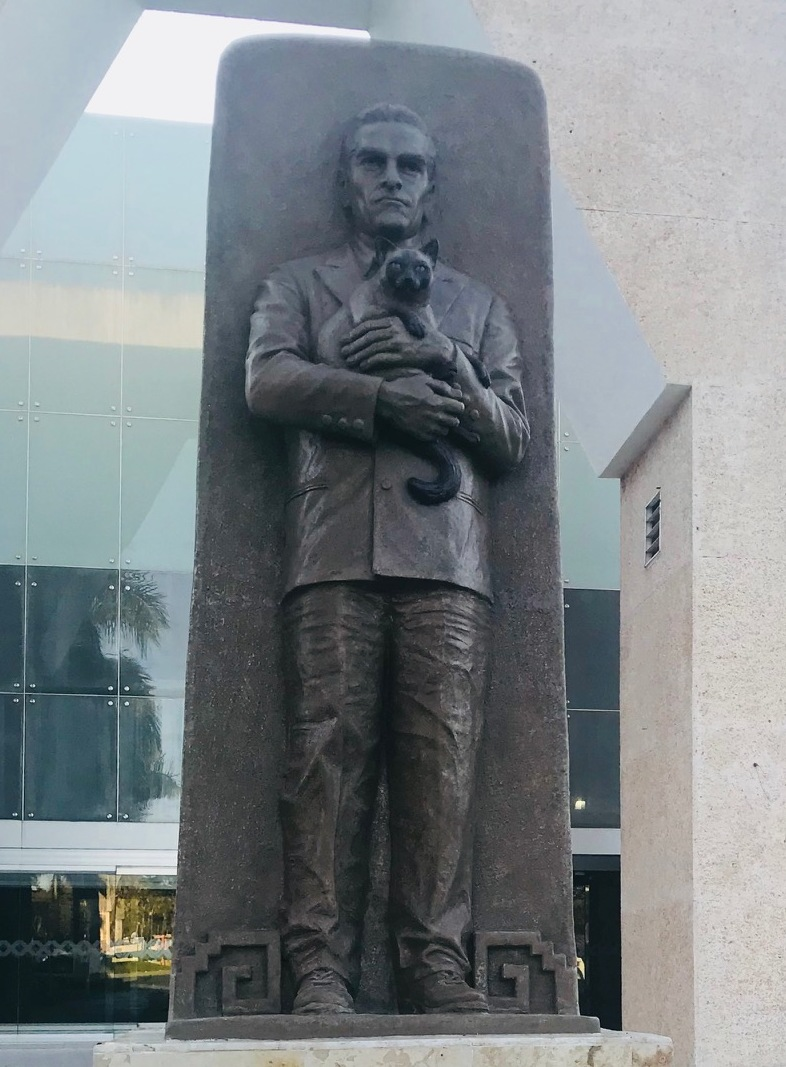
Monument to Yuri Knorozov and his cat Asya in Mérida, Yucatán

Knorozov had presented his work in 1956 at the International Congress of Americanists in Copenhagen, but in the ensuing years he was not able to travel abroad at all. After diplomatic relations between Guatemala and the Soviet Union were restored in 1990, Knorozov was invited by President Vinicio Cerezo to visit Guatemala. President Cerezo awarded Knorozov the Order of the Quetzal, and Knorozov visited several of the major Mayan archaeological sites—including Tikal. The government of Mexico awarded Knorozov the Order of the Aztec Eagle, the highest decoration awarded by the Mexican state to non-citizens, in a ceremony at the Mexican Embassy in Moscow on 30 November 1994. While receiving the award, he said in Spanish Mi corazón siempre es mexicano ("My heart is forever Mexican").

Knorozov had broad interests in, and contributed to, other investigative fields such as archaeology, semiotics, human migration to the Americas, and the evolution of the mind. However, it is his contributions to the field of Maya studies for which he is best remembered. In his very last years, Knorozov is also known to have pointed to a place in Northern Mexico as the likely location of Chicomoztoc, the ancestral land from which—according to ancient documents and accounts considered mythical by a sizable number of scholars—the Aztec are said to have come.

Knorozov died in Saint Petersburg on 30 March 1999. He was survived by his daughter Ekaterina and granddaughter Anna. In 2018, a monument was erected to Knorozov in Mérida, Yucatán.

== List of publications ==
What follows is an incomplete listing of Knorozov's papers, conference reports and other publications, divided by subject area and type. Note that several of those listed are re-editions and/or translations of earlier papers.

Knorozov submitted a 1973 article on "the classification of signaling systems" (вопросу о классификации сигнализации) as being co-authored by himself and his cat Asya, who lived with him from about 1970-1973. The editor stripped Asya of coauthorship. Asya is featured on his monument in Mérida.

=== Maya-related ===
==== Conference papers ====
- "A brief summary of the studies of the ancient Maya hieroglyphic writing in the Soviet Union". Reports of the Soviet Delegations at the 10th International Congress of Historical Science in Rome. Moscow: Academy of Sciences of the Soviet Union. 1955.
- "Краткие итоги изучения древней письменности майя в Советском Союзе" [Brief summary of the study of ancient Mayan writing in the Soviet Union]. Proceedings of the International Congress of Historical Sciences (Rome, 1955). Rome. 1956. pp. 343–364.
- "New data on the Maya written language". Proc. 32nd International Congress of Americanists, (Copenhagen, 1956). Copenhagen. 1958. pp. 467–475.
- "La lengua de los textos jeroglíficos mayas" [The language of Mayan hieroglyphic texts]. Proceedings of the International Congress of Americanists (33rd session, San José, 1958). San José, Costa Rica. 1959. pp. 573–579.
- "Le Panthéon des anciens Maya" [The Pantheon of the Ancient Maya]. Proceedings of the International Congress of Anthropological and Ethnological Sciences (7th session, Moscow, 1964). Moscow. 1970. pp. 126–232.

==== Journal articles ====
- "Древняя письменность Центральной Америки" [Ancient Writings of Central America]. Sovetskaya Etnografiya. 3 (2): 100–118. 1952.
- "Письменность древних майя (опыт расшифровки)" [Written Language of the Ancient Maya] (PDF). Sovetskaya Etnografiya. 1: 94–125. 1955.
- "New data on the Maya written language". Journal de la Société des Américanistes de Paris. 45: 209–217. 1956. doi:10.3406/jsa.1956.961.
- "Estudio de los jeroglíficos mayas en la U.R.S.S." [The Study of Maya hieroglyphics in the USSR]. Khana, Revista municipal de artes y letras. 2 (17–18): 183–189. 1958.
- "The problem of the study of the Maya hieroglyphic writing". American Antiquity. 23 (3). Translated by Sophie Coe: 284–291. 1958. doi:10.2307/276310. JSTOR 276310. S2CID 163305055.
- "Problem of deciphering Mayan writing". Diogènes. 10 (40). Translated by Sidney Alexander: 122–128. 1962. doi:10.1177/039219216201004007. S2CID 143041913.
- "Machine decipherment of Maya script". Soviet Anthropology and Archeology. 1 (3): 43–50. 1963. doi:10.2753/aae1061-1959010343.
- "Aplicación de las matematicas al estudio lingüistico" [Application of mathematics to linguistic studies]. Estudios de Cultura Maya. 3: 169–185. 1963. doi:10.19130/iifl.ecm.1963.3.686.
- "Principios para descifrar los escritos mayas" [Principles for deciphering Maya writing]. Estudios de Cultura Maya. 5: 153–188. 1965. doi:10.19130/iifl.ecm.1965.5.667.
- "Investigación formal de los textos jeroglíficos mayas" [Formal investigations of Maya hieroglyphic texts]. Estudios de Cultura Maya. 7: 153–188. 1968. doi:10.19130/iifl.ecm.1968.7.694.
- "Заметки о календаре майя: 365-дневный год" [Notes on the Mayan Calendar: 365-Day Year]. Sovetskaya Etnografiya. 1: 70–80. 1973.
- "Notas sobre el calendario maya; el monumento E de Tres Zapotes" [Notes on the Mayan calendar; Monument E of Tres Zapotes]. América Latina; Estudios de Científicos Soviéticos. 3: 125–140. 1974.
- "Acerca de las relaciones precolombinas entre América y el Viejo Mundo" [About pre-Columbian relations between America and the Old World]. América Latina; Estudios de Científicos Soviéticos. 1: 84–98. 1986.

==== Books ====
- La antigua escritura de los pueblos de America Central [The ancient writing of the peoples of Central America]. Mexico City: Fondo de Cultura Popular. 1954.
- Система письма древних майя. Moscow: Ethnographic Institute, Academy of Sciences of the Soviet Union. 1955.
- "Сообщение о делах в Юкатане" Диего де Ланда как историко-этнографический источник ["Report on the Affairs in Yucatan" by Diego de Landa as a Historical and Ethnographic Source]. Moscow: Academy of Sciences of the Soviet Union. 1956. (Knorozov's doctoral dissertation)
- Письменность индейцев майя [Mayan Writing]. Moscow-Leningrad: Ethnographic Institute, Academy of Sciences of the Soviet Union. 1963.
- Tatiana Proskouriakoff, ed. (1967). Selected Chapters from The Writing of the Maya Indians. Russian Translation Series. Vol. 4. Translated by Sophie Coe. Peabody Museum of Archaeology and Ethnology. OCLC 572565556.
- Иероглифические рукописи майя [Mayan Hieroglyphic Manuscripts]. Leningrad: Ethnographic Institute, Academy of Sciences of the Soviet Union. 1975.
- Maya Hieroglyphic Codices. Translated by Sophie Coe. Albany: Institute for Mesoamerican Studies. 1982. OCLC 10779290.

=== Others ===
- "Preliminary Report on the Study of the Written Language of Easter Island". Journal of the Polynesian Society. 66 (1): 5–17. 1957. (on the Rongorongo script, with N. A. Butinov)
- Предварительное сообщение об исследовании протоиндейских текстов [Preliminary report on the study of Proto-Indian texts]. Moscow: Ethnographic Institute, Academy of Sciences of the Soviet Union. 1965. (Collated results of a research team under Knorozov investigating the Harappan script, with the use of computers)
- "Протоиндейские надписи (к проблеме дешифровки)" [Proto-Indian inscriptions (to the problem of decipherment)]. Sovetskaya Etnografiya. 5 (2): 47–71. 1981. (on the Harappan script of the Indus Valley civilization)
