= Grasshopper Pueblo =

Formerly populated place in North America

Coordinates: 34°04′32″N 110°37′49″W

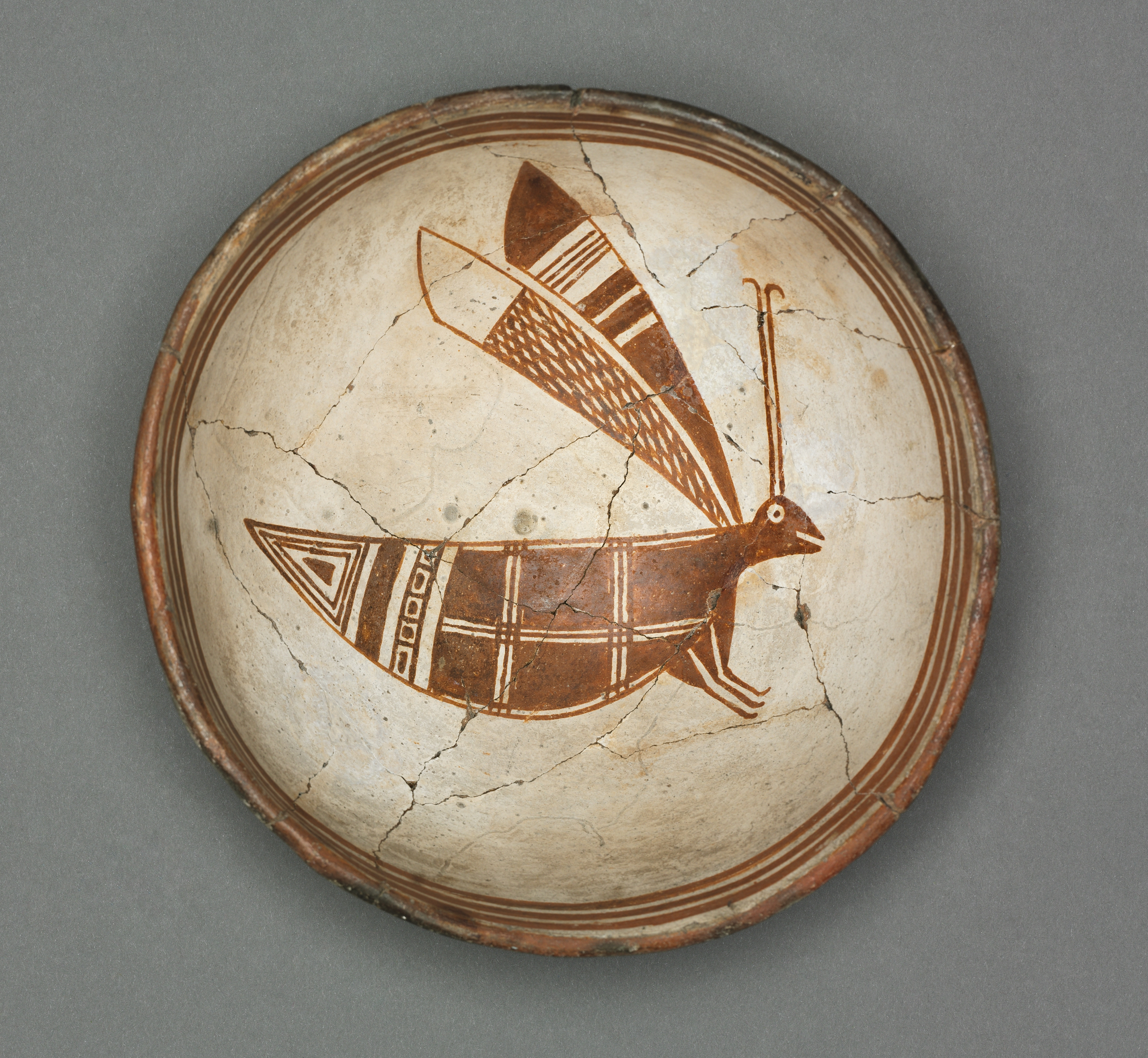
Bowl with Grasshopper, ceramic created by a Mogollon artist, c. 1100 (Photo: Open Access at the Cleveland Museum of Art)

Grasshopper or Grasshopper Pueblo, sometimes called Grasshopper Ruin, was a populated place from 1275 to 1400 CE at what is now Fort Apache Indian Reservation, about 10 mi (16 km) west of Cibecue in east-central Arizona in the United States. The settlement was a multicultural community that housed people from Puebloan, Mogollon and possibly Salado backgrounds, et al. Initial excavations of the "extremely large" masonry pueblo found 500 rooms, two smaller pueblos of 20 to 30 rooms, multiple kivas, hearths, courtyards, refuse dumps, multiple cemeteries, grave goods, and animal burials.

There are two explanations for the site's name: one says that the Pueblo is named for a "lame Apache woman whom the Indians called 'Naz-chug-gee' (Grasshopper)" and another story says it's simply a place rich in grasshoppers. The buildings are located in a mountain meadow at an estimated elevation of 5,922 feet (1,805 m) above sea level; Salt River Draw runs through the middle of settlement, suggesting the waterway was used as a natural boundary between neighborhoods. The roof of the Great Kiva, built c. 1330 and excavated 1964–67, was found to have been supported by 12 "massive" juniper posts. There is evidence of that some of the pueblo buildings had a second story. Parrot and macaw skeletons found at the site are evidence of an exotic-animal trade between the Southwestern region of North America and Central America. Turquoise was likely exchanged for the macaws and other Mesoamerican trade goods, including copper bells.

The University of Arizona Archaeological Field School was established at the site in 1963. Anonymous donations funded the construction of a kitchen, classroom and student housing at the site (which was leased from the White Mountain Apache tribe) in support of annual summer excavation work. LBJ's daughter Lynda Bird Johnson attended the Grasshopper Field School as a "special student" for two weeks in 1965. Over the decades, researchers studied the site's sediments, geology and lithic resources, floral and faunal remains, human skeletal remains, and pollen profile, generating "many published papers, nine doctoral dissertations, and two masters' theses." The Field School closed in 1992.

Other notable archeological sites in east-central Arizona include Kinishba, Canyon Creek, Forestdale, Point of Pines, and Vernon.
