= Thomas Gann =

British physician and archaeologist

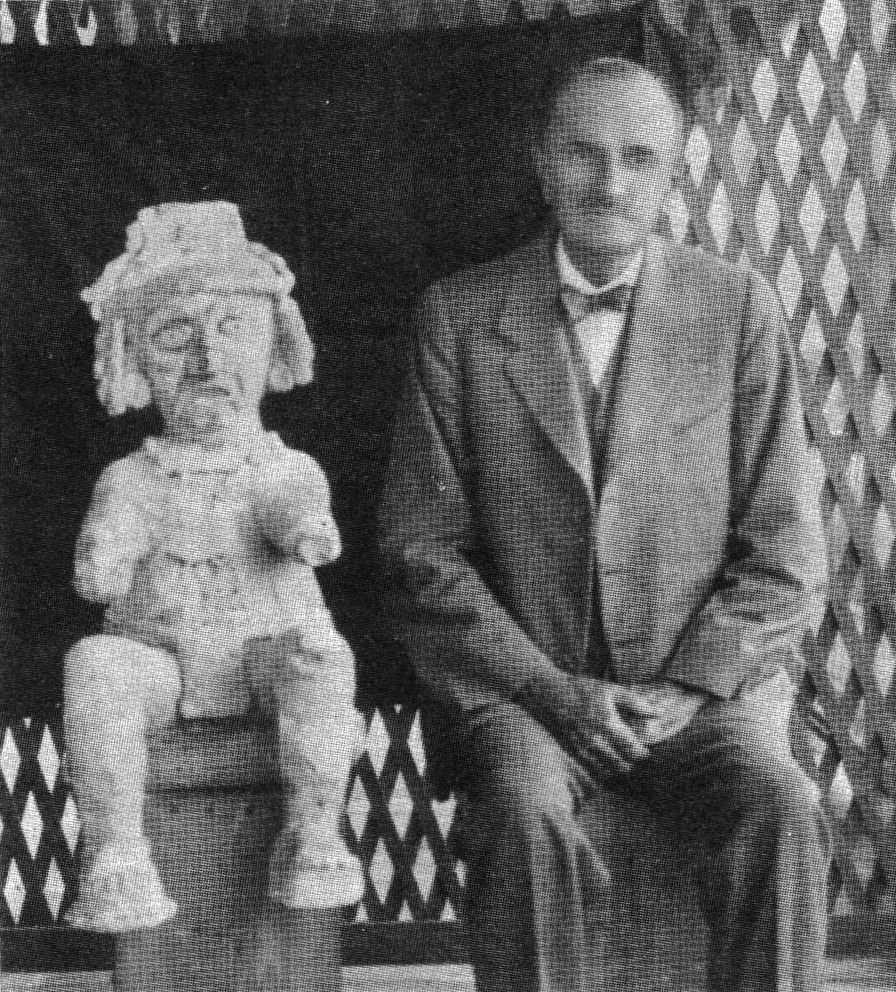
Gann with stucco idol he found at Tulum in the 1920s (now kept in the British Museum)

Thomas William Francis Gann (13 May 1867 – 24 February 1938) was a medical doctor by profession, but is best remembered for his work as an amateur archaeologist exploring ruins of the Maya civilization.

== Personal history ==
Thomas Gann was born in Murrisk Abbey, County Mayo, Ireland, the son of William Gann of Whitstable, England, and Rose Garvey of Murrisk Abbey. He was raised in Whitstable, where his parents were prominent in the social life of the town. Gann trained in medicine in Middlesex, England.

Somerset Maugham named the heroine of Cakes and Ale Rosie Gann.

== Career ==
In 1894 he was appointed district medical officer for British Honduras, where he would spend most of the next quarter century. He soon developed a keen interest in the colony's Mayan ruins, which up to then had been little documented. He also traveled in the Yucatán Peninsula, exploring ruins there.

Gann discovered a number of sites, including Lubaantun, Ichpaatun, and Tzibanche. He published the first detailed descriptions of such ruins as Xunantunich and Lamanai. He made important early explorations at Santa Rita, Louisville, and Coba. At Tulum he documented buildings overlooked by previous explorers, including a rare find of a temple with the Pre-Columbian idol still intact inside.

Midway through his career, in 1908 Gann became the honorary lecturer in Central American Antiquities at the new Institute of Archaeology of the University of Liverpool (not long after he had taken the Diploma there in Tropical Medicine). Liverpool subscribers funded several of his fieldwork seasons up to 1912.

== Retirement ==
Thomas Gann retired as British Honduras's medical officer in 1923 when he wrote several books about his travels and explorations. He sold a large number of objects he had collected in the Mayan region to the British Museum in 1924.

== Legacy ==
Thomas Gann is reflected upon by different contemporaries in many ways. Some like David David Pendergast reflect on Gann's methods as destructive, saying he ‘remained more destructive than protective of evidence from beginning to end’ This was supported by Gann's independent claims of blowing up numerous mounds all across Belize, Guatemala, and Mexico to the Society of Antiquaries of London in 1897. Jared Jared Milanich took a more comedic route when discussing Gann, referring to him as a "mound mauler" for his past actions and excavation techniques. This implies that while he doesn't approve of his methods, he views them as something comical from a prior era. Author Cynthia Robin an anthropologist at NorthWestern] described them as both "unsightly" and as "'Gann Holes'" Though some Authors such as J.E. Thompson cut Gann some slack saying, "Gann reflected the attitude of his period, which regarded excavation as the retrieval of works of art or "curios," not as a means of recovering history."

== Works ==
- The Maya Indians of Southern Yucatan and Northern British Honduras (Washington: Government Printing Office, 1918)
- with Thompson, J.E. The History of the Maya (London: Scribner, 1931)
- Mexico from the Earliest Times to the Conquest (London: Lovat Dickson, 1936)
