= Charles Étienne Brasseur de Bourbourg =

French ethnographer, historian, and priest (1814–1874)

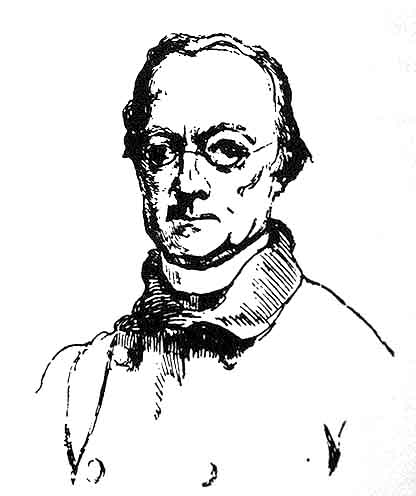
- Abbé Charles Étienne Brasseur de Bourbourg. Lithograph from J. Windsor's 19th-century publication, Aboriginal America.
- Born: 8 September 1814; Bourbourg, France
- Died: 8 January 1874 (aged 59); Nice, France
- Occupations: Catholic priest; writer, ethnographer, historian and archaeologist.
- Writing career
- Subject: Mesoamerican studies

Abbé Charles-Étienne Brasseur de Bourbourg (8 September 1814 – 8 January 1874) was a noted French writer, ethnographer, historian, archaeologist, and Catholic priest. He became a specialist in Mesoamerican studies, travelling extensively in the region. His writings, publications, and recovery of historical documents contributed much to knowledge of the region's languages, writing, history and culture, particularly those of the Maya and Aztec civilizations. However, his speculations concerning relationships between the ancient Maya and the lost continent of Atlantis inspired Ignatius L. Donnelly and encouraged the pseudo-science of Mayanism.

== Early life and writings ==
He was born in Bourbourg, a small town with many Flemish influences near Dunkirk, France, as the First French Empire was ending.

As a youth he went to Ghent in newly independent Belgium to study theology and philosophy. He became interested in writing during his studies there. Enthusiastic about Flanders' history, he wrote several essays about local folklore, which enabled him to enter literary circles. In 1837, aged 23, Brasseur traveled to Paris with the support of French poet Alphonse-Marie-Louis de Prat Lamartine. In Paris, he became involved with political newspapers that sought the democratization of power such as Le Monde. During this time, he began contributing essays to a Parisian journal. He wrote several historical accounts (using a pseudonym), including one concerning Jerusalem. He published several novels of Romantic style which was then very much in vogue. One of these, Le Sérapéon, received reviews which implied it had a very close resemblance to François-René de Chateaubriand's 1809 novel Les Martyrs. Such near-allegations of plagiarism and inaccuracies in his works were to be made several times during his career.

Despite such criticisms, his reputation as a notable young writer and intellectual continued to develop. He transferred his studies and residence to Rome, where in 1845 he was ordained into the Roman Catholic priesthood, at the age of 30.

== Dispatched to Quebec ==
A year previously he had come to the attention of the Canadian Abbé, Léon Gingras, whom he had met (and apparently impressed) in Rome. Abbé Gingras entreated his friend and colleague the vicar-general of Quebec, Abbé Charles-Félix Cazeau, to have Brasseur de Bourbourg assigned to a job in the seminary there. Correspondence began in late 1844, with Abbé Gingras claiming that the seminary should "...move heaven and earth to ensure that such a splendid bird does not escape us and fly to Montreal, where it would be so highly thought of".

A year later after having obtained his ordination, Brasseur de Bourbourg's job in Quebec was approved by the Archbishop, Joseph Signay, and in the autumn of 1845 he left Europe for the British colony of the Province of Canada, stopping briefly in Boston along the way.

Upon his arrival in Quebec City he began work as a professor of ecclesiastical history at the seminary (the Séminaire de Québec, founded in 1663). After only a brief time however, his series of lectures was discontinued, for some unspecified reason.

Perhaps having extra time, Brasseur de Bourbourg began a programme of research of the history of the archdiocese of Quebec, and in particular of its 17th-century founder, François de Laval, the first Roman Catholic Bishop of Quebec (after whom the seminary's later incarnation as a University, the Université Laval, is named). The results of his archival investigations were published in early 1846 as a biography of Laval. The contents of this pamphlet seemed to displease his Canadian colleagues somewhat, for a dispute began which made his position there uncertain, or at least uncomfortable. Also, he apparently disliked the harsh winter climate (to judge by some comments he made in the dedication of his later History of Canada), and may also have been a factor in his departure which was soon to ensue.

He left the seminary later in that year, returning to Boston where he found a job with the diocese of Boston. The then current bishop, John Bernard Fitzpatrick, with whom he was evidently on better terms than with his previous superiors, made him vicar-general of the diocese.

Towards the end of the year Brasseur de Bourbourg returned to Europe, to spend some time conducting research in the archives of Rome and Madrid, in preparation for a new project—travel to Central America.

== Travels and expeditions to Central America ==
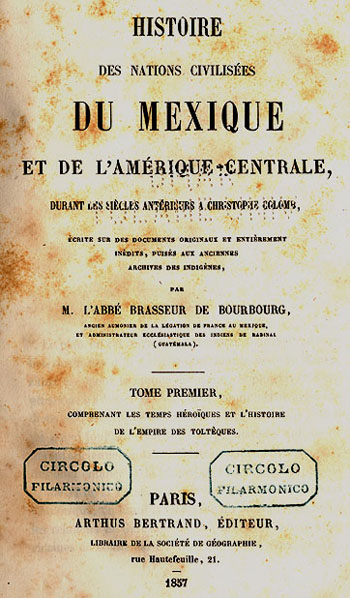
Coverpage of Brasseur de Bourbourg's original 1857 work, "Histoire du Mexique".

From 1848 to 1863 he travelled extensively as a missionary in many parts of Mexico and Central America.

During these journeys he gave great attention to Mesoamerican antiquities and became well-versed in the then-current theories and knowledge about the history of the region and the Pre-Columbian civilisations whose sites and monuments remained, yet were little understood.

Using information he had collected during his time spent travelling there, as well as that compiled by other scholars of his time, he published during 1857–1859 a history of the Aztec civilization, containing what was then known or speculated about the former kingdom, which had been conquered some three hundred years previously by the Spanish conquistadores in alliance with local enemies of the Aztecs.

He also conducted research into the local languages and their transliteration into the Latin alphabet. Between 1861 and 1864 he edited and published a collection of documents in the indigenous languages.

In 1864 he was archaeologist of the French military expedition in Mexico, and his resulting work Monuments anciens du Mexique was published by the French Government in 1866.

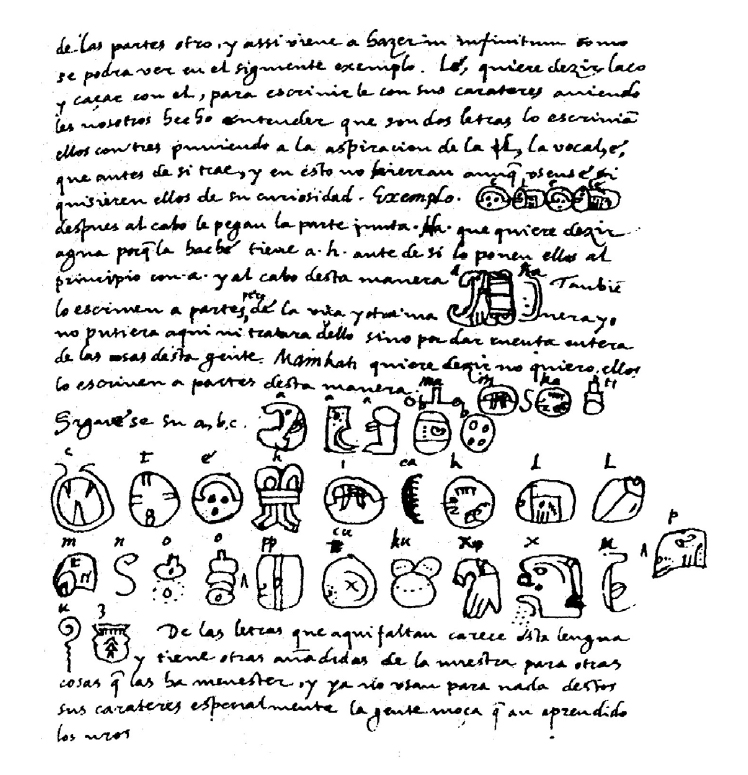
Page from Brasseur de Bourbourg's edition of de Landa's Relación de las Cosas de Yucatán, with the famous de Landa alphabet.

== Discovery of de Landa's work ==
In 1862 while searching through archives at the Royal Academy of History in Madrid for New World materials, he came across an abridged copy of a manuscript which had originally been written by the Spanish cleric Diego de Landa sometime around 1566. De Landa had been one of those charged with disseminating the Roman Catholic faith amongst the Maya peoples in Spain's new Central American possessions during the period after the Spanish conquest of Yucatán, and had lived there for several years. His manuscript (Relación de las Cosas de Yucatán) had been written upon his enforced return to Spain, where he was charged with illegally or improperly conducting an Inquisition (he was later absolved, returning to the New World as the appointed Bishop of Yucatán). In the manuscript de Landa had recorded much information about the Maya peoples and customs, based on his own observations and discussions with Mayan informants. Brasseur de Bourbourg's main interest in the document, however, was a section in which de Landa reproduced what he termed "an alphabet" of the as-yet undeciphered Maya hieroglyphics, the writing system of the ancient Maya civilization. In this passage de Landa had annotated the Mayan symbols (or glyphs) which supposedly corresponded to the letters of the Spanish alphabet, as given to him by a Maya informant who he had quizzed. Brasseur de Bourbourg realised that this could prove to be basis of deciphering the Maya script, and he announced this discovery when republishing the manuscript (in a bilingual Spanish-French edition) in late 1863 with the title, Relation des choses de Yucatán de Diego de Landa.

However, upon initial analysis by Brasseur de Bourbourg and others, the so-called "de Landa alphabet" proved to be problematic and inconsistent, and these immediate attempts to use this alphabet as a kind of "Rosetta Stone" to read the glyphs failed. Nevertheless, Brasseur de Bourbourg's uncovering of this document and de Landa's alphabet would much later prove to be vital in the eventual decipherment of the Maya glyphs. Brasseur de Bourbourg's attempts, and those of others which followed, were misled insofar as they interpreted the signs alphabetically. When the signs were recognised to be mainly syllabic, significant progress was made.

== Publication of the Popol Vuh ==
In 1861 he published another significant work: a French translation of the Popol Vuh, a sacred book of the Quiché (Kʼicheʼ) Maya people. He included a grammar of the Kʼicheʼ language and an essay on Central American mythology.

== Speculations concerning Atlantis ==
Brasseur began to write about Atlantis in his publication Grammaire de la langue quichée (1862), in which he expressed his belief that the lost land described by Plato had existed with an advanced degree of civilization before the beginning of civilizations in Europe and Asia. He suggested that the origins of European and Persian words could be traced to indigenous languages of the Americas and that the ancient cultures of the New and Old Worlds had been in constant communication with one another.

In 1866, Monuments anciens du Mexique (Palenque, et autres ruines de l'ancienne civilisation du Mexique) was published with a text by Brasseur de Bourbourg accompanied by lavish illustrations by Jean-Frédéric Waldeck. Although Waldeck's depictions of the ruins at Palenque were based on first-hand knowledge, his artistic reconstructions and embellishments implied a close relationship between Maya art and architecture and that of Classical antiquity Greece and Rome. This was subsequently demonstrated to be spurious, but not before Waldeck's artwork had inspired speculations about contact between New and Old World civilizations, specifically via the lost continent of Atlantis.

These speculations were reinforced by Brasseur de Bourboug's own references to Plato's descriptions of the culture and society of Atlantis, which Brasseur believed was continued by ancient Maya civilization, in his book Quatre Lettres sur le Méxique (1868). In this publication, Brasseur de Bourbourg made extensive parallels between Maya and Egyptian pantheons and cosmologies, implying that they all had a common source on the lost continent of Atlantis. He developed these ideas further in his publication Quatre lettres sur le Mexique (1868), which presents a history of Atlantis based on his interpretation of Maya myths. His writings inspired Augustus Le Plongeon and also Ignatius L. Donnelly, whose book Atlantis: The Antediluvian World contains numerous references to Brasseur de Bourbourg's scholarship. However, an academic wrote in 1875 that not a single contemporary scholar accepted Brasseur de Bourbourg's theories about Atlantis.

The combination of Brasseur de Bourbourg's interests in spiritualism and these speculations about relations between the ancient Maya and Atlantis provided the basis for Mayanism.

== Identification of a Maya codex ==
In 1866, Brasseur de Bourbourg had an opportunity to examine an artefact in Madrid which was in the possession of a Spanish paleography professor named Juan de Tro y Ortolano, who had purchased it some six years earlier. This artefact was an old codex, a book made from paper-bark in the form of a folded screen of continuous pages, several metres in length when extended. The codex contained numerous signs and drawings, which Brasseur de Bourbourg was readily able to identify as being Mayan in origin, having seen and studied many similar markings and glyphs while in Central America.

Tro y Ortolano gave him permission to publish the codex in a reproduction, and Brasseur de Bourbourg gave it the name Troano Codex in his honour. His identification of the codex was significant, as it was the only third such Maya codex to have been uncovered (the second, the Codex Paris, had been discovered by the French scholar Léon de Rosny only a few years before). In particular, Brasseur de Bourbourg recognised its exceeding rarity, since de Landa's Relación, which he had earlier rediscovered, gave an account of how he had ordered the destruction of all such Maya codices he could find, and many volumes had been burned.

During 1869–1870 Brasseur de Bourbourg published his analyses and interpretations of the content of the Troano codex in his work Manuscrit Troano, études sur le système graphique et la langue des Mayas. He proposed some translations for the glyphs recorded in the codex, in part based on the associated pictures and in part on de Landa's alphabet, but his efforts were tentative and largely unsuccessful.

However, his translation would later inspire Augustus Le Plongeon's pseudo-science and speculation about the lost continent of Mu. The name Mu was actually used first by Brasseur de Bourbourg.

A few years later, another Maya codex was found possessed by another collector, which became known as the Codex Cortesianus (in the belief that it had been in the possession of Hernán Cortés). When Léon de Rosny examined it later, he determined that it was actually a part of the Troano codex, the two parts having been separated at some indeterminate time in the past. The two parts were later rejoined and are known collectively as the Codex Madrid or Tro-Cortesianus; they remain displayed in Madrid.

In 1871 Brasseur de Bourbourg published his Bibliothèque Mexico-Guatémalienne, a compendium of literature and sources associated with Mesoamerican studies.

His last article, "Chronologie historique des Mexicains" (1872) refers to the Codex Chimalpopoca and identifies four periods of world cataclysms that began about 10,500 BC and were the result of shifts of the Earth's axis (a concept related to pole shift theory).

== Death and legacy ==
He died at Nice at the beginning of 1874, at the age of 59.

His archaeological fieldwork, as well as his diligent collection, discovery and republication of source materials, proved to be very useful for subsequent Mesoamerican researchers and scholars. The interpretations and theories he advanced proved to be mostly inaccurate.

== List of publications ==
A listing of his publications (either original works or reproductions of historical documents), by original publication date. The place of publication is annotated (in brackets), and the shorter or common name of the publication is bolded. The list is not necessarily complete.

- 1837 - Le Monde Journal (Paris), various articles and essays;
- 1839 - **Le Sérapéon**, épisode de l'histoire du IVe siècle (Paris), a novel;
- 1839 - **La dernière vestale** (Paris), a novel;
- 1843 - **Jérusalem**, tableau de l'histoire et des vicissitudes de cette ville célèbre depuis son origine la plus reculée jusqu'à nos jours (Lille, France. Published under the pseudonym **Étienne de Ravensberg**);
- 1846 - **Esquisse biographique sur Mgr de Laval**, premier évêque de Québec (Québec);
- 1851 - **(las) Cartas** para servir de Introducción á la Historia primitiva de las Naciones civilizadas de la América setentrional... (Mexico), Spanish & French translations;
- 1852 - **Histoire du Canada**, de son Église et de ses missions depuis la découverte de l'Amérique jusqu'à nos jours, écrite sur des documents inédits compulsés dans les archives de l'archevêché et de la ville de Québec, etc. (2 vols., Paris);
- 1853 - **Le khalife de Bagdad** (Paris), a novel;
- 1853 - **Histoire du Patrimoine de Saint-Pierre depuis les Temps apostoliques jusqu'à nos jours** (Plancy, Paris, Arras, Amiens);
- 1857—59 - **Histoire des nations civilisées du Mexique et de l'Amérique Centrale**, durant les siècles antérieurs à Christophe Colomb ... (4 vols., Paris);
- 1861 - **Voyage sur l'Isthme de Tehuantepec** dans l'état de Chiapas et la République de Guatémala, 1859 et 1860 (Paris);
- 1861 - **Popol Vuh**, le Livre sacré des Quichés, &c. (Paris);
- 1862 - **Grammaire Quichée** et le drame de Rabinal Achí (Paris);
- 1862 - **Sommaire des voyages** scientifiques et des travaux de géographie, d'histoire, d’archéologie et de philologie américaines (Saint-Cloud, France);
- 1864 - **Relation des choses du Yucatán** de Diego de Landa (Paris), reproduction and translation of de Landa's work;
- 1866 - **Monuments anciens du Mexique** (Palenque, et autres ruines de l'ancienne civilisation du Mexique) (Paris);
- 1868 - **Quatre Lettres sur le Mexique** (Paris)
- 1869—70 - **Manuscrit Troano**, étude sur le système graphique et la langue des Mayas (2 vols., Paris);
- 1871 - **Bibliothèque Mexico-guatémalienne** (Paris)

A collection of travel accounts and reports which Brasseur de Bourbourg sent to the French Minister for Education and Religion from Mexico, Guatemala and Spain is stored at the Archives Nationales (Paris), F17, 2942.
