= Diane Zaino Chase =

American archaeologist

Diane Zaino Chase (born 1953) is an American anthropologist and archaeologist who specializes in the study of the Ancient Maya. As of January 2023, she serves as senior vice president for academic affairs and provost of the University of Houston and senior vice chancellor for academic affairs for the University of Houston System.

== Career ==
Chase attended the University of Pennsylvania, graduating with a BA in anthropology in 1975. She completed her PhD at the University of Pennsylvania in 1982 with a dissertation on "Spatial and Temporal Variability in Postclassical Northern Belize".

Chase taught anthropology at the University of Pennsylvania, Princeton, and West Chester University before gaining permanent employment at the University of Central Florida.

From 1985 to 1995, Chase served as a guest curator for the Orlando Museum of Art.

In 2000, she was appointed the interdisciplinary coordinator of academic affairs at the University of Central Florida.

In 2003, she was awarded the honor of Pegasus Professor. According to the office of the provost, "the Pegasus Professor Award recognizes a faculty member who has made a significant impact on the university and will have demonstrated excellence in teaching, research, and service."

She has continued to take on administrative positions. She has served as interim assistant vice president of academic affairs, assistant vice president of academic affairs, the interim chair for the Department of Theatre in the College of Arts and Humanities, associate vice president of planning and evaluation for academic affairs, vice provost for academic affairs, and the interim provost and vice president of academic affairs.

In 2010, Chase was appointed executive vice provost for academic affairs of the University of Central Florida. In April 2014, she was appointed interim provost and vice president for academic affairs at the same institution.

In 2015, Chase argued against eliminating three degree programs from the University of Central Florida's curriculum.

In 2016, Chase was appointed executive vice president and provost at the University of Nevada, Las Vegas (UNLV).

In 2019 Chase joined Claremont Graduate University as its vice president for academic innovation, student success, and strategic initiatives. In this role, she oversaw programs related to recruiting, admissions, onboarding, student experience, retention, graduation, and related student outcomes.

She joined the University of Houston and University of Houston System in 2023 as senior vice president for academic affairs and provost, and senior vice chancellor for academic affairs, respectively. At UH, she has supported student success and faculty excellence initiatives, as well as the academic quality and accreditation of all four UH System institutions: UH, the University of Houston-Downtown, the University of Houston-Clear Lake and the University of Houston-Victoria.

== Archaeological career ==
Chase has been conducting archaeological excavations since the 1970s, with a focus on the Ancient Maya. From 1979 to 1985 she conducted archaeological excavations with her husband at Santa Rita, Corozal.

Since 1985, Chase and her husband have been the directors of the Caracol Archaeological Project in Belize. Their fieldwork conducted at Caracol over the past 30 years has resulted in significant contributions to the ongoing research into the Ancient Maya. Dr. Diane Chase has identified and excavated several burials. Significant finds at Caracol include the 1986 field season discovery of Altar 21, which recorded the defeat of Tikal by Caracol. The same year Altar 21 was discovered, two intact tombs were uncovered along with an intact tomb of a royal woman that was dated at 634 CE. Another royal tomb was discovered in 1993 that was dated to 537 CE.

In 2007, Chase and her husband, along with biologist John Weishampel, received a grant from NASA to conduct a canopy penetrating radar called LiDAR. LiDAR uses remote sensing to see through the canopy and penetrate the ground to detect the archaeological ruins beneath the canopy.

Chase has authored and co-authored many literary publications on Mesoamerican archaeology. Her knowledge in the field of Mayan archaeology has led to television programs to feature her in documentaries featuring Mayan history and archaeology, including the television series Nova. Drs. Diane and Arlen Chase's archaeological fieldwork at Caracol included the stabilization of the structure Caana, the largest man-made structure in Belize. This led to the Belizean government to declare Caracol a National Park, and to pave a road into Caracol to allow for easier access for tourists. The site currently has nearly 100 visitors daily, even though it is located 52 miles from the nearest town.

Diana Chase has balanced her archaeological research with a number of administrative appointments. In her administrative roles, she has worked on initiatives related to student success . With her husband, Arlen Chase, she has conducted research on the ancient Maya that has contributed to scholarly understanding of Maya social and political organization and the scale of Maya urbanism

In 2023, Chase and her husband Arlen Chase were featured on CBS Saturday Morning discussing their long-term research at Caracol. In that same year she also spearheaded the article “Mesoamerican Urbanism Revisited: Environmental Change, Adaptation, Resilience, Persistence, and Collapse” that was published in the Proceedings of the National Academy of Sciences.

== Personal life ==
She is married to Dr. Arlen F. Chase, who is also an archaeologist whose work focuses on the ancient Maya. Their eldest child, Adrian, is pursuing a career in Mesoamerican archaeology as well. They have two other children: Aubrey and Elyse Chase. All three children have accompanied their parents to the archaeological site of Caracol in Belize, where they have been conducting excavations for over thirty years.

== Honors and awards ==
- 2009 Elected as Fellow in the American Association for the Advancement of Science
- 2006 Research Incentive Award
- 2004 Inducted into Phi Kappa Phi honor society
- 2003 Awarded the status of Pegasus Professor, which is given to professors who have demonstrated distinction in research, teaching and service. This is the highest tribute that a faculty member may receive at the University of Central Florida.
- 2001 Research Incentive Award
- 1999-2001 Distinguished lecturer for Sigma Xi
- 1998 Teaching Incentive Award
- 1998 Web Site Excellent Award- Anthropology: for www.caracol.org
- 1995–present Trevor Colburn Endowment (Co-Beneficiary with A. Chase)
- 1994 Teaching Incentive Award
- 1987 Elected to Quill – the literary society of the University of Central Florida
