= Budy, Ukraine =

Rural locality in Kharkiv Oblast, Ukraine

Budy Буди
- Rural settlement
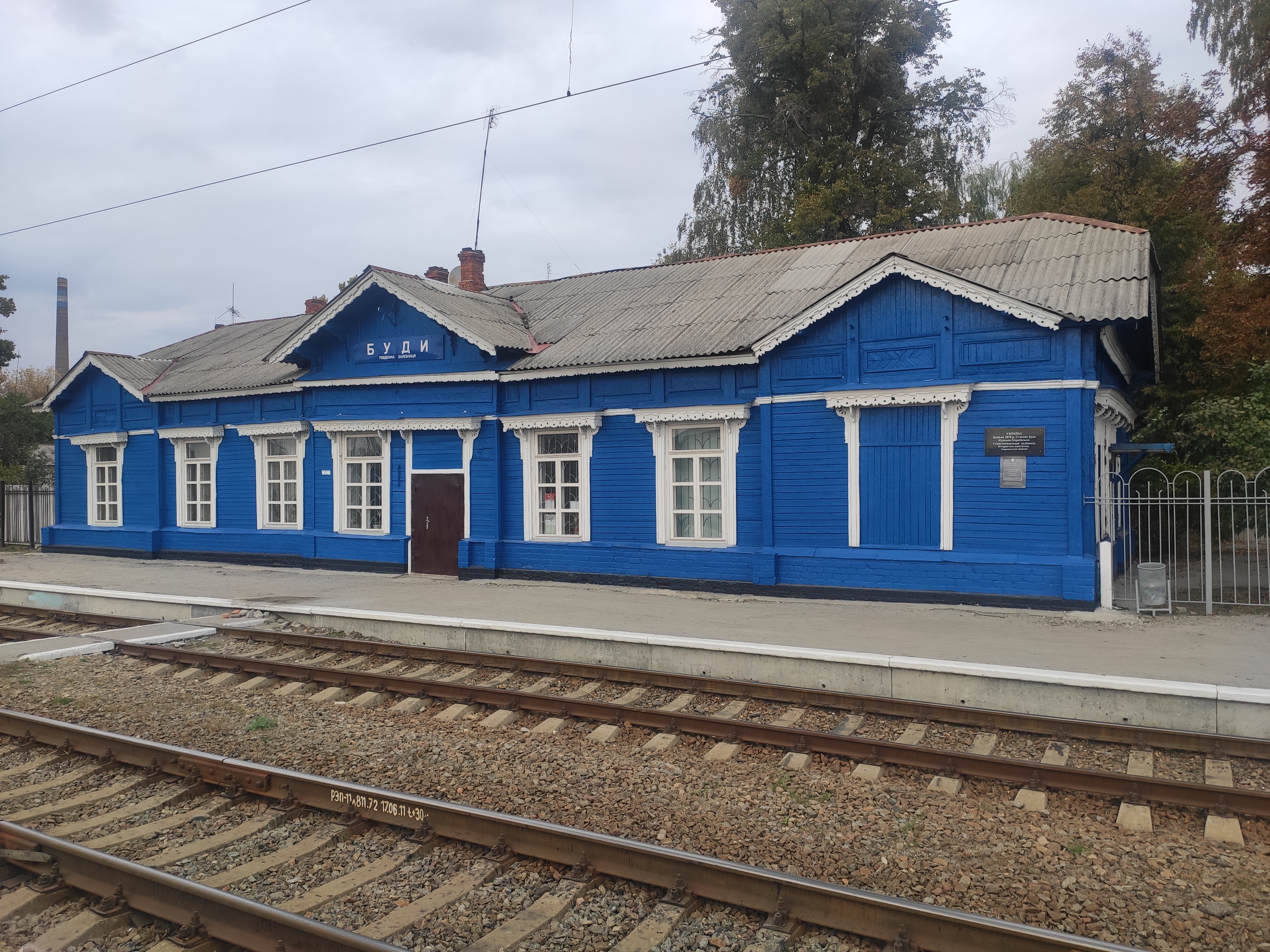
- Budy railway station

- Location in Kharkiv Oblast Location in Ukraine
- Coordinates: 49°53′31″N 36°01′23″E
- Country: Ukraine
- Oblast: Kharkiv Oblast
- Raion: Kharkiv Raion
- Hromada: Pivdenne urban hromada

Population (2022)
  - Total: 5,829
- Time zone: UTC+2 (EET)
  - Summer (DST): UTC+3 (EEST)

Budy (Ukrainian: Буди, Russian: Буды) is a rural settlement in Kharkiv Raion of Kharkiv Oblast in Ukraine. It is located on the left bank of the Merefa, in the drainage basin of the Don. Budy belongs to Pivdenne urban hromada. Population: 5,829 (2022 estimate)

Until 26 January 2024, Budy was designated urban-type settlement. On this day, a new law entered into force which abolished this status, and Budy became a rural settlement.

== Economy ==
=== Transportation ===
Budy railway station, located in the settlement, is on the railway connecting Liubotyn and Merefa. There is infrequent passenger traffic.

The settlement is included in the road network of Kharkiv urban agglomeration.
