= William E. Gates =

American Mesoamericanist (1863-1940)

- Born: December 8, 1863; Atlanta, Georgia
- Died: April 24, 1940 (aged 76); Baltimore, Maryland
- Education: Johns Hopkins University; law degree, University of Virginia
- Employer(s): Archaeology Commission of the Maryland Academy of Science, Carnegie Institution for Science, Republic of Guatemala, archaeology department, American Indian Defense Association, Tulane University
- Known for: Researching Mayan language hieroglyphs; speaking at least 13 languages
- Parent(s): Katherine Appley and William H. Gates

William Edmond Gates (December 8, 1863 – April 24, 1940) was an American Mayanist. Most of his research focused around Mayan language hieroglyphs. He also collected Mesoamerican manuscripts. Gates studied Mayan-based languages like Yucatec Maya, Ch'olti', Huastec and Q'eqchi'. Biographies state that he could speak at least 13 languages. Works and archives related to Gates reside in the collections of Brigham Young University.

== Early life and education ==
Gates was born in 1863 in Atlanta, Georgia. His parents were William H. Gates (1833 in NY - 1901) and Katherine Appley. Gates attended school in Philadelphia, Pennsylvania. He attended Johns Hopkins University and University of Virginia. He graduated in 1886 with a law degree. The following year he moved to Cleveland, Ohio. He ran a printing company.

== Mayan studies ==
In 1898 he bought a copy of the Codex Troano. This triggered his interest in Maya culture. In 1900 he retired from his work in printing. He relocated to San Diego, California. He became involved in theosophy. He moved to a theosophy colony called the Aryan Theosophical Colony. It was located in Point Loma, a neighborhood of San Diego. He started teaching antiquities at the colony college. While teaching, he researched and published about Mayan culture and language. He started building his own collection of Mayan documentation, including manuscripts and photographs of manuscripts. By 1910 he had published the Paris Codex. Two years later, he started exploring how comparing different Mayan languages could help make further discoveries about Mayan hieroglyphs. He departed from New Orleans in June 1917 to visit Guatemala for archaeological research.

He started, and served as president of, the Maya Society at Philadelphia in 1920. He started working for the Archaeology Commission of the Maryland Academy of Science as a consultant. The following year he became a researcher at the Carnegie Institution for Science. He discovered a monument dating from 120 BC in on while on a trip in Guatemala. This is credited with solidifying that the Mayan culture was older than originally thought. In 1922, he started working for the Republic of Guatemala as director-general of their archaeology department. He was also the director of the archaeology museum there. Gates was living in Charlottesville, Virginia and traveled to Guatemala, too. After one visit in 1922 he returned to Charlottesville with a Kʼicheʼ man he had met. In Charlottesville, Gates studied the Kʼicheʼ language using a wave writer.

In 1924, Gates became director of the American Indian Defense Association. That year, Tulane University bought half of his Mayan archives. He also started working for Tulane in their Middle American Research department. Gates would, by 1930, sell his farm in Charlottesville, allowing him to sustain his research. He published the first and only issue of the Mayan Society in 1930 through Tulane. It was received poorly by faculty at Tulane and never published again. Gates also published various codices, including the Dresden Codex and Madrid Codex. He was also highly active in developing education and land policies while working for the United States Bureau of Indian Affairs in 1934.

== Later life and legacy ==
Princeton University acquired the other half of Gates Mayan archives in 1936. The following year, Gates relocated to Washington, D.C. He worked at the Library of Congress and published three editions of A Grammar of Maya in 1938. Gates died in Baltimore, Maryland in 1940.

Works by and collections once owned by Gates are held in the collections of Brigham Young University.

== Published works ==
Gates' published works include:

- The Maya and Tzental calendars (1900)
- Commentary upon the Maya-Tzental Perez codex (1910)
- Early Chinese Painting (1916)
- An Outline Dictionary of Maya Glyphs (1931)
- The Dresden codex (1932)
- The Madrid Maya codex (1933)
- Rural education in Mexico and the Indian problem (1935)
- The Maya society and its work (1937)
- A grammar of Maya (1938)
- The De la Cruz-Badiano Aztec herbal of 1552 (1939)
