= Maya astronomy =

Aspect of Precolumbian Maya science

Maya astronomy is the study of the Moon, planets, Milky Way, Sun, and astronomical phenomena by the Precolumbian Maya civilization of Mesoamerica. The Classic Maya in particular developed some of the most accurate pre-telescope astronomy in the world, aided by their fully developed writing system and their positional numeral system, both of which are fully indigenous to Mesoamerica. The Classic Maya understood many astronomical phenomena: for example, their estimate of the length of the synodic month was more accurate than Ptolemy's, and their calculation of the length of the tropical solar year was more accurate than that of the Spanish when the latter first arrived. One of the purposes that Maya priest-astronomers observed the celestial movement is to discover the pattern that supports the agricultural schedule. Many temples from the Maya architecture have features oriented to celestial events.

== European and Maya calendars ==
=== European calendar ===
In 46 BC Julius Caesar decreed that the year would be made up of twelve months of approximately 30 days each to make a year of 365 days and a leap year of 366 days. The civil year had 365.25 days. This is the Julian calendar. The solar year has 365.2422 days and by 1582 there was an appreciable discrepancy between the winter solstice and Christmas and the vernal equinox and Easter. Pope Gregory XIII, with the help of Italian astronomer Aloysius Lilius (Luigi Lilio), reformed this system by abolishing the days October 5 through October 14, 1582. This brought the civil and tropical years back into line. He also missed three days every four centuries by decreeing that centuries are only leap years if they are evenly divisible by 400. So for example 1700, 1800, and 1900 are not leap years but 1600 and 2000 are. This is the Gregorian calendar. Astronomers use the Julian/Gregorian calendar. Dates before 46 BC are converted to the Julian calendar. This is the proleptic Julian calendar. Astronomical calculations return a year zero and years before that are negative numbers. This is astronomical dating. There is no year zero in historical dating. In historical dating the year 1 BC is followed by the year 1 so for example, the year −3113 (astronomical dating) is the same as 3114 BC (historical dating).

Many mayanists convert Maya calendar dates into the proleptic Gregorian calendar. In this calendar, Julian calendar dates are revised as if the Gregorian calendar had been in use before October 15, 1582. These dates must be converted to astronomical dates before they can be used to study Maya astronomy because astronomers use the Julian/Gregorian calendar. Proleptic Gregorian dates vary substantially from astronomical dates. For example, the mythical creation date in the Maya calendar is August 11, 3114 BC in the proleptic Gregorian calendar and September 6, −3113 astronomical.

=== Julian days ===
Astronomers describe time as a number of days and a fraction of a day since noon January 1, −4712 Greenwich Mean Time. The Julian day starts at noon because they are interested in things that are visible at night. The number of days and fraction of a day elapsed since this time is a Julian day. The whole number of days elapsed since this time is a Julian day number.

=== Maya calendars ===
There are three main Maya calendars:

The Long Count is a count of days. The Long Count calendar was particularly notable for its accuracy in tracking celestial events. For example, the Maya were able to predict solar eclipses and the movements of Venus with remarkable precision. This knowledge was not only used for agricultural planning but also played a significant role in religious ceremonies and royal legitimization. There are examples of Long Counts with many places but most of them give five places since the mythical creation date – 13.0.0.0.0.

There were several types of calendars to count the days in Maya, letting the Maya associate the different calendars. Both agricultural cycles of the Tzotzil in southern Mexico and the Chorti of Guatemala starts 260 days from early February. The beginning of the Chorti seasonal calendar has flexibility to be the first visible moon around February 8th, which is a day or two later than the astronomical new moon. Tzotzil people integrated the Chorti 260-day with a solid 365-day calendar. Below explains the structure of each type of calendar.

The Tzolkʼin is a 260-day calendar made up of a day from one to 13 and 20 day names. By pairing the numbers with the 20 names, that leaves 260 unique days with every combination of numbers/names happening once. The 260-day calendar led the Maya people to observe the lunar phenomena to know the agricultural cycle, even today. Especially, a solar eclipse during the agricultural season was carefully observed, since it is the pinpoint of the new lunar occurrence. Also, this calendar was of the most sacred to the Maya, and was used as an almanac to determine farming cycles, and for religious practices to specify dates for ceremonies. These 260 days were each considered individual gods and goddesses that were not persuaded by a higher power. Unlike the 365 day year, this 260 day year was used less for counting/calculations, and more to arrange tasks, celebrations, ceremonies, etc. In some present day Maya communities, this 260 day almanac is still used, mostly for religious practices.

The Haab' is a 365-day year made up of a day of zero to 19 and 18 months with five unlucky days at the end of the year.

When the Tzolkʼin and Haabʼ are both given, the date is called a calendar round. The same calendar round repeats every 18,980 days – approximately 52 years. The calendar round on the mythical starting date of this creation was 4 Ahau 8 Kumk'u. When this date occurs again it is called a calendar round completion.

A Year Bearer is a Tzolkʼin day name that occurs on the first day of the Haab'. A number of different year bearer systems were in use in Mesoamerica.

=== Correlating the Maya and European calendar ===
The Maya and European calendars are correlated by using the Julian day number of the starting date of the current creation — 13.0.0.0.0, 4 Ajaw, 8 Kumk'u. The Julian day number of noon on this day was 584,283. This is the GMT correlation.

== Sources of astronomical inscriptions ==
=== Maya codices ===
At the time of the Spanish conquest the Maya had many books. These were painted on folding bark cloth. The Spanish conquistadors and Catholic priests destroyed them whenever they found them. The most infamous example of this was the burning of a large number of these in Maní, Yucatán by Bishop Diego de Landa in July 1562. Only four of these codices exist today. These are the Dresden, Madrid, Paris and Grolier codices. The Dresden Codex is an astronomical Almanac. Although they, using the codex, did not successfully make a prediction of an eclipse in their place, eclipse tables in the Dresden Codex provided Maya people with opportunities to predict when an eclipse would occur in someplace. The Madrid Codex mainly consists of almanacs and horoscopes that were used to help Maya priests in the performance of their ceremonies and divinatory rituals. It also contains astronomical tables, although less than are found in the other three surviving Maya codices. The Paris Codex contains prophecies for tuns and katuns (see Mesoamerican Long Count calendar), and a Maya zodiac. The Grolier Codex is a Venus almanac.

Ernst Förstemann, a librarian at the Royal Public Library of Dresden, recognized that the Dresden Codex is an astronomical almanac and was able to decipher much of it in the early 20th century.

=== Maya monuments ===
==== Maya stelae ====
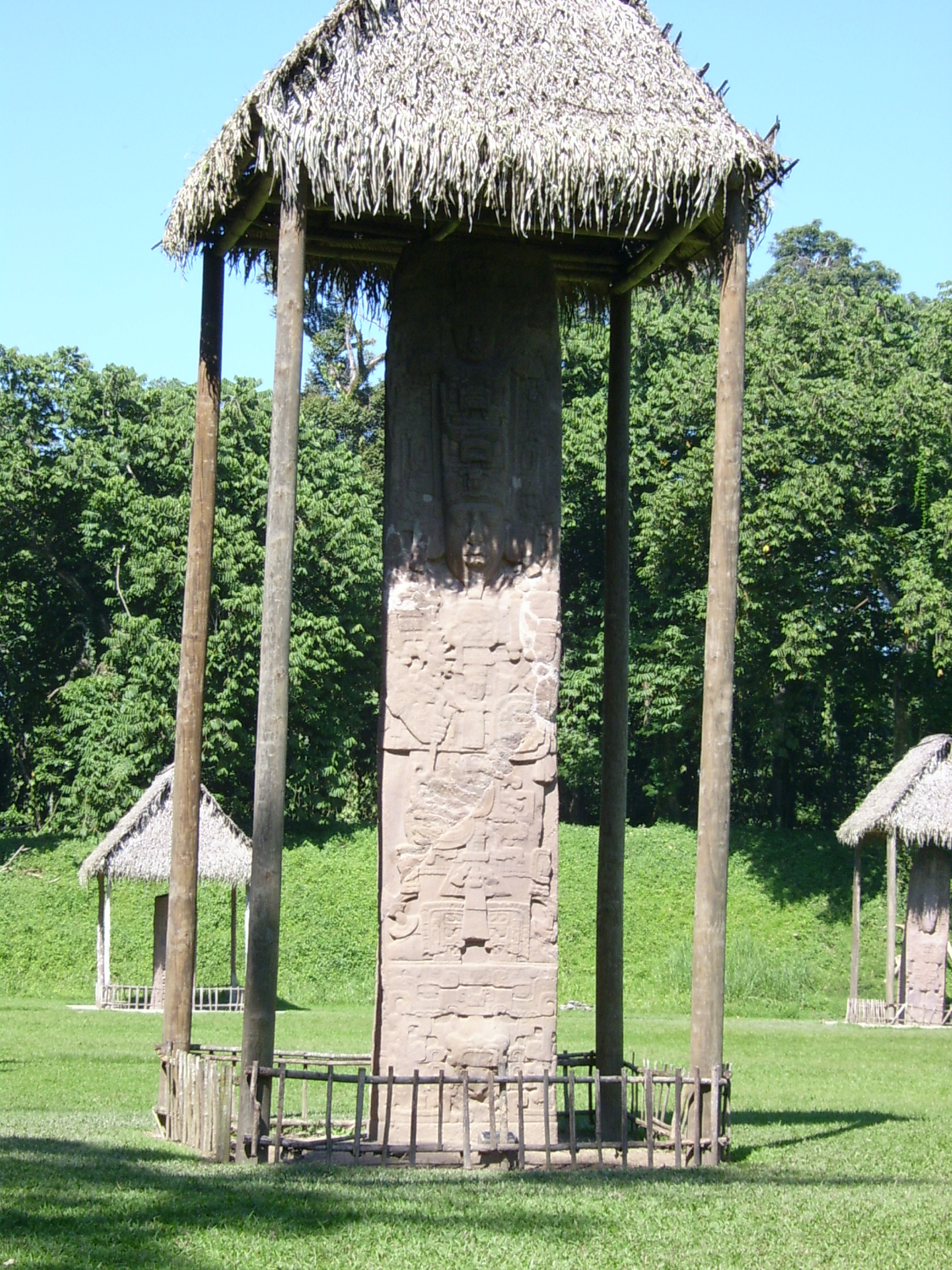
Stela E at Quiriguá, possibly the largest freestanding stone monument in the New World

The Maya erected a large number of stelae. These had a Long Count date. They also included a supplementary series. The supplementary series included lunar data – the number of days elapsed in the current lunation, the length of the lunation and the number of the lunation in a series of six. Some of them included an 819-day count which may be a count of the days in a cycle associated with Jupiter. See Jupiter and Saturn below. Some other astronomical events were recorded, for example the eclipse warning on Quirigua Stela E – 9.17.0.0.0. A partial solar eclipse was visible in Mesoamerica two days later on 9.17.0.0.2 – Friday January 18, 771.

Santa Elena Poco Uinic Stela 3 has a date of 9.17.19.13.16 5 K'ib' 14 Ch'en, July 16, 790, with a solar eclipse glyph. A total solar eclipse crossed directly over the site three days later on July 16, 790.

==== Calendric inscriptions ====
Many Mayan temples were inscribed with hieroglyphic texts. These contain both calendric and astronomical content.

An archaeoastronomical study by Martínez-González examined the chronological correspondence between the enthronement of Ukit Kan Le'k Tok', dated to 26 May 770 in the Mural of the 96 Glyphs at Ekʼ Balam, and Chinese records of comet C/770 K1 from the same day. The reconstructed orbit placed the comet in the northeastern sky before sunrise, under conditions compatible with naked-eye visibility from northern Yucatán.

== Methods of astronomical observation ==
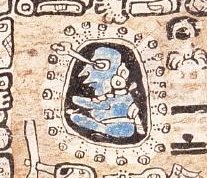
Figure in the Madrid Codex, interpreted as an astronomer

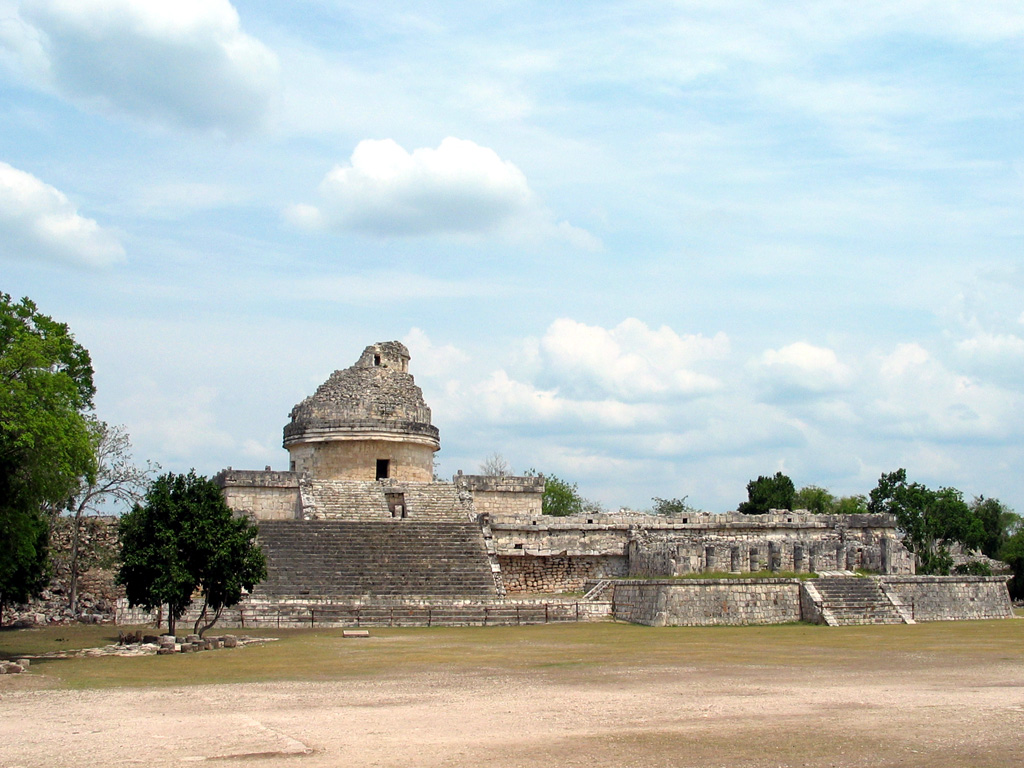
The Caracol at Chichen Itza is an observatory

Maya astronomy was naked-eye astronomy based on the observations of the azimuths of the rising and setting of heavenly bodies. City planning and alignment was often arranged in line with astronomical paths and events. The Maya also believed that the will and actions of gods could be interpreted in the alignment of the planets and stars.

Many wells located in Mayan ruins were also observatories of the zenithal passage of the sun.

One of the most studied sites for the topic of Mayan astronomy is the El Caracol at Chichen Itza. The Caracol is an observatory aligned to follow the path of Venus through the year. The grand staircase leading to the once cylindrical structure deviates 27.5 degrees from the alignment of the surrounding buildings to align with the northern extreme of Venus; the northeast-southwest diagonal of the site aligns with the sunrise of the summer solstice and the sunset of the winter solstice.

== Astronomical observations ==
=== Solar ===
The Maya were aware of the solstices and equinoxes. This is demonstrated in building alignments. More important to them were zenithal passage days. In the tropics the Sun passes directly overhead twice each year. Many known structures in Mayan temples were built to observe this. An example of such temples is the observatory at Xochicalco. The observatory is an underground chamber with a hole in the ceiling. Two days of the year on May 15 and July 29, the sun would directly illuminate an illustration of the sun on the floor. Munro S. Edmonson studied 60 mesoamerican calendars and found remarkable consistency in the calendars, except for a number of different year bearer systems. He thought that these different year bearers were based on the solar years in which they were initiated. The sun was very important in the Mayan culture. The Mayan sun god was Kinich Ahau, one of the Mayan creator gods. Kinich Ahau would shine in the sky all day before being believed to transform himself into a jaguar at night to pass through Xibalba, the Mayan underworld.

The Maya were aware of the fact that the 365-day Haab' differs from the Tropical year by about 0.25 days per year. A number of different intervals are given on Maya monuments that can be used to approximate the tropical year. The most accurate of these is that the tropical year exceeds the length of the 365 day Haab' by one day every 1,508 days. The occurrence of a particular solstice on a given date in the Haab' will repeat after the passage of 1,508 365-day Haab' years. The Haab' will lose one day every 1,508 days and it will take 1,508 Haab' years to lose one Haab' year. So 365 x 1,508 = 365.2422 x 1,507 or 1,508 Haab' years = 1,507 Tropical years of 365.2422 days.

==== The Tropical Year in the Maya codices ====
The solstices and equinoxes are described in many almanacs and tables in the Maya codices. There are three seasonal tables and four related almanacs in the Dresden Codex. There are five solar almanacs in the Madrid Codex and possibly an almanac in the Paris codex. Many of these can be dated to the second half of the ninth and first half of the tenth centuries.

The Dresden Codex

The upper and lower seasonal tables (pages 61–69) unify the Haab', the solstices and equinoxes, the eclipse cycle and the year bearer (0 Pop). The table refers to the middle of the tenth century but includes more than a dozen other base dates from the fourth to the eleventh centuries.

The rainmaking almanac (pages 29b to 30b) refers to the Haab' and the tropical year. During the year in question the summer solstice preceded the Half Year by a few days. This confirms that the year was either 857 or 899. It also describes a four-part rain-making ceremony similar to Yucatecan ceremonies known from modern ethnography.

The Spliced Table (pages 31.a to 39.a) is the combination of two separate tables. It includes rituals including those of the Uayab', the Half Year, agricultural and meteorological matters. It contains a reference to the Half Year, skybands, two of which contain Venus glyphs. The table has four base dates; two in the fourth century, one in the ninth and one in the tenth century. Three of these are also base dates in the seasonal table

The Burner Almanac (pages 33c to 39c) contains the stations of the Burner cycle, a system for dividing the Tzolkʼin that is known from the colonial history of Yucatán. The almanac also refers to eclipse seasons and stations of the tropical year. This almanac refers to a few years before and just after 1520, when the codex may have already been in the hands of the Spanish.

The Conjugal Almanac (pages 22c to 23c) is one of a series of almanacs dealing with conjugal relationships between pairs of deities. It may contain a reference to the vernal equinox.

In addition to the astronomical tables preserved in the Dresden codex, there are illustrations of different deities and their relation to the positions of the planets.

The Madrid Codex

Pages 10b,c – 11b, c of the Madrid Codex contain two almanacs similar to the seasonal tables of the Dresden Codex. In the lower almanac the Half Year of the Haab' occurred on the same day as the summer solstice, dating this event to the year 925.

The long almanac (pages 12b to 18b) includes iconography of the Haab, abundant rain and astronomy. The almanac contains several eclipse glyphs, spaced at correct eclipse intervals. The eclipse and calendar dates allow one to date the almanac to the year 924. The combination of this almanac and the seasonal almanacs in this codex are the functional equivalent of the two seasonal almanacs in the Dresden Codex.

Pages 58.c to 62.c are a tropical-year almanac. It is an 1820-day almanac made up of 20 rows of 91 days each. One of the captions associates an equinox with a glyph for Venus. This dates the almanac to a date between 890 and 962.

The Bird Almanac (pages 26c to 27c) has an unusual structure (5 x 156 = 780 days). One of its pictures is probably a reference to the vernal equinox. This almanac can't be dated.

The Paris Codex

The God C almanacs (pages 15a, b to 18a, b) are very incomplete and partially effaced. It is impossible to ascertain their lengths or dates. Two known Haab' rituals can be recognized. It's possible that the God C almanacs are equivalent to the seasonal tables in the Dresden Codex and the God C almanacs in the Paris Codex

The Books of Chilam Balam

The Book of Chilam Balam specifically refers to the Half Year, the solstices and equinoxes.

==== Building alignments ====
Anthony Aveni and Horst Hartung published an extensive study of building alignments in the Maya area. They found that most orientations occur in a zone 8°-18° east of north with many at 14° and 25° east of north. He believes that the 25° south of east orientations are oriented to the position on the horizon of sunrise on the winter solstice and that the 25° north of west orientations are aligned with sunset on the summer solstice. Further systematic research has led to the recognition of several orientation groups, most of which refer to agriculturally significant sunrise and sunset dates.

Two diagonal alignments across the platform of the base Caracol at Chichén Itzá, are aligned with the azimuth of the sunrise on the summer solstice and an alignment perpendicular to the base of the lower platform corresponds to the azimuth of the sunset on the summer solstice. One of the windows in the round tower provides a narrow slit for viewing the sunset on the equinoxes. The Caracol was also used to observe the zenithal passage of the Sun. An alignment perpendicular to the base of the upper platform and one from the center of a doorway above the symbolate monument are aligned with the azimuth of the sunset on zenith passage days.

Other solar observatories are at Uaxactun, Oxkintok and Yaxchilan.

=== Lunar ===
Many inscriptions include data on the number of days elapsed in the current lunation, the number of days in the current lunation and the position of the lunation in a cycle of six lunations. In fact, the 260-day agricultural cycle in Maya, which is between February and October, was according to lunar phases. This can be why the Maya people were interested in phenomena related to the Moon such as solar eclipses.

Modern astronomers consider conjunction of Sun and Moon (when the Sun and Moon have the same ecliptic longitude) to be the New Moon. The Maya counted the zero day of the lunar cycle as either the first day when one could no longer see the waning crescent Moon or the first day when one could see the thin crescent waxing Moon (the Palenque system). Using this system, the zero date of the lunar count is about two days after astronomical new Moon. Aveni and Fuls analysed a large number of these inscription and found strong evidence for the Palenque system. However Fuls found "... at least two different methods and formulas were used to calculate the moon's age and position in the six-month cycle..."

==== Building alignments ====
A number of orientations to lunar extremes (standstill positions on the horizon) have been identified. Most of them are concentrated on the Northeast Coast of the Yucatan peninsula, where the cult of goddess Ixchel, associated with the Moon, is known to have been important.

=== Mercury ===
Pages 30c-33c of the Dresden codex are a Venus-Mercury almanac. The 2340-day length of the Venus-Mercury almanac is a close approximation of the synodic periods of Venus (4 x 585) and Mercury (20 x 117). The Almanac also refers to the summer solstice and the Haab' uayeb ceremonies for the tenth century AD.

=== Venus ===
Venus was extremely important to the people of Mesoamerica. Its cycles were carefully tracked by the Maya. The Maya associated the planet Venus with war, and battles would be arranged to align with the movements of Venus. The Maya would also sacrifice captured enemies according to Venus' position in the sky. The observation of Venus has an important meaning for the Maya agriculture. Since it was believed that Venus is responsible for the rainfall in the Maya area, the farmers looked at Venus to predict the amount of rain in the rainy season. In fact, the Chicchan serpent was considered not only to be the deity of Venus but also to be the deity of rainfall, denoting the parallels with the Venus deity managing the rain in the tradition.

Because Venus is closer to the Sun than the Earth, it passes the Earth during its orbit. When it passes behind the Sun at superior conjunction and between the Earth and the Sun at inferior conjunction it is invisible. Particularly dramatic is the disappearance as evening star and its reappearance as the morning star approximately eight days later, after inferior conjunction. The cycle of Venus is 583.92 days long but it varies between 576.6 and 588.1 days. Astronomers calculate heliacal phenomena (first and last visibility of rising or setting bodies) using the arcus visionis – the difference in altitude between the body and the center of the Sun at the time of geometric rising or setting of the body, not including the 34 arc minutes of refraction that allows one to see a body before its geometric rise or the 0.266,563,88... degree semidiameter of the sun. Atmospheric phenomena like extinction are not considered. The required arcus visionis varies with the brightness of the body. Because Venus varies in size and has phases, a different arcus visionus is used for the four different rising and settings. (Note: Meeus, Salvo De Meis, Carl Schoch and others use the following values for calculating this: Rising as morning star: the first morning with an arcus visionis greater than 5.7° at sunrise Setting as morning star: the last morning with an arcus visionis greater than 6.0° at sunrise Rising as evening star: the first evening with an arcus visionis greater than 6.0° at sunset Setting as evening star: the last evening with an arcus visionis greater than 5.2° at sunset)

Dresden Codex

The Dresden Codex pages 24 and 46 to 50 are a Venus almanac. Bricker and Bricker write:

"The Venus table tracks the synodic cycle of Venus by listing the formal or canonical dates of planet's first and last appearances as 'morning star' and 'evening star'. The emphasis, both iconographic and textual, is on first appearance as morning star (heliacal rise), the dates of which are given quite accurately, This first appearance was regarded as a time of danger and the major purpose of the Venus table was to provide warnings of such dangerous days. The table lists the tzolkin days for the four appearance/disappearance events during each of the 65 consecutive Venus cycles, a period of approximately 104 years. The table was used at least four times with different starting dates, from the tenth through the fourteenth centuries AD."

Because the Maya canonical period was 584 days and the synodic period is 583.92 days, an error accumulated in the table over time. Possible correction schemes from the codex are discussed by Aveni and Bricker and Bricker.

The Dresden Codex pages 8–59 is a planetary table that commensurates the synodic cycles of Mars and Venus. There are four possible base dates, two in the seventh and two in the eighth centuries.

Pages 30c-33c of the Dresden codex are a Venus-Mercury almanac. The 2340-day length of the Venus-Mercury almanac is a close approximation of the synodic periods of Venus (4 x 585) and Mercury (20 x 117). The Almanac also refers to the summer solstice and the Haab' uayeb ceremonies for the tenth century AD.

The Grolier Codex

The Grolier Codex lists Tzolkʼin dates for the appearance/disappearances of Venus for half of the Venus cycles in the Dresden codex. These are the same dates listed in Dresden.

Building alignments

The Caracol at Chichen Itza contains the remains of windows through which the extreme elongations of the planet can be seen. Four of the main orientations of the lower platform mark the points of the maximum horizontal displacement of the planet during the year. Two alignments of the surviving windows in the upper tower align with the extreme positions of the planet at its greatest north and south declinations.

Building 22 at Copán is called the Venus temple because Venus symbols are inscribed on it. It has a narrow window that can be used to observe Venus on certain dates.

The Governors Palace at Uxmal differs 30° from the northeast alignment of the other buildings. The door faces southeast. About 4.5 km from the door is a pyramidal hill, from where Venus northerly extremes could be observed over the Governor's Palace. The cornices of the building have hundreds of masks of Chaac with Venus symbols under the eyelids.

Inscriptions

De Meis has a table of 14 Long Count inscriptions that record heliacal phenomena of Venus.

De Meis has a table of 11 Long Counts that record the greatest elongation of Venus.

The Bonampak murals depict the victory of king Chaan Muan with his enemies lying down, pleading for their lives on a date which was the heliacal rising of Venus and a zenith passage of the Sun. (Note: Aveni 1993 p.272 – 9.18.1.15.5 = August 2, 792 [sic] This is converted using a correlation constant of 584,285 days. 9.18.1.15.5 = July 31, GMT.)

=== Mars ===
The Dresden Codex

The Dresden Codex contains three Mars tables and there is a partial Mars almanac in the Madrid codex.

Pages 43b to 45b of the Dresden codex are a table of the 780-day synodic cycle of Mars. The retrograde period of its path, when it is brightest and visible for the longest time, is emphasized. The table is dated to the retrograde period of 818 AD. The text refers to an eclipse season (when the moon is near its ascending or descending node) that coincided with the retrograde motion of mars.

The upper and lower water tables on pages 69–74 share the same pages in the Dresden Codex but are different from each other.

The upper table has 13 groups of 54 days – 702 days. This is the time needed for Mars to return to the same celestial longitude, if the celestial period included a retrograde period. The table was revised for reuse; it has seven base dates from the seventh to the eleventh centuries.

The lower water table has 28 groups of 65 days – 1820 days. This table has only one picture – a scene of torrential rain on page 74. This has been erroneously interpreted as a depiction of the end of the world. The purpose of the table is to track several cultural and natural cycles. These are planting and harvesting, drought, rain and hurricane season, the eclipse season and the relationship of the Milky Way to the horizon. The table was periodically revised by giving it five base dates from the fourth to the twelfth centuries.

The Dresden Codex pages 8–59 is a planetary table that commensurates the synodic cycles of Mars and Venus. There are four possible base dates, two in the seventh and two in the eighth centuries.

The Madrid Codex

Page 2a of the Madrid codex is an almanac of the synodic cycle of Mars. This heavily damaged page is probably a fragment of a longer table. The 78-day periods and iconography are similar to the table in the Dresden Codex.

=== Jupiter and Saturn ===
Saturn and particularly Jupiter are two of the brightest celestial objects. As the Earth passes superior planets in its orbit closer to the Sun they appear to stop moving in the direction of travel of their orbits and back up for a period before resuming their path through the sky. This is apparent retrograde motion. When they start or end retrograde motion their daily motion is stationary before going in another direction.

Inscriptions

Lounsbury found that the dates of several inscriptions commemorating dynastic rituals at Palenque by Kʼinich Kan Bahlam II coincide with the departure of Jupiter from its secondary stationary point. He also showed that close conjunctions of Jupiter, Saturn and/or Mars were probably celebrated, particularly the "2 Cib 14 Mol" event on about July 21, 690 (Proleptic Gregorian calendar date) – July 18 astronomical.

The Dumbarton Oaks Relief Panel 1 came from El Cayo, Chiapas – a site 12 kilometers up the Usumacinta River from Piedras Negras. Fox and Juteson (1978) found that two of these dates are separated by 378 days – close to the mean synodic period of Saturn – 378.1 days. Each date also falls a few days before Saturn reached its second stationary point, before ending its retrograde motion. The Brickers identified two additional dates that are part of the same series.

Susan Milbrath has extended Lounsbury's work concerning Jupiter to other classic and post-classic sites. Central to her work is her identification of God K (K'awil) as Jupiter. Another component of her work is the tying together of the synodic cycles of Jupiter and Saturn with the katun cycles of the Long Count. She finds a clear link between God K images and dates coinciding with its stationary points in retrograde. She believes that K'awil is the god of the retrograde cycles of Jupiter and Saturn. The Brickers question this interpretation.

Maya Codices

No clear Jupiter or Saturn almanac can be found in the codices.

=== Eclipses ===
The Dresden Codex

The Dresden Codex pages 51 and 58 are an eclipse table. The table contains a warning of all solar and most lunar eclipses. It does not specify which ones will be visible in the Maya area. The length of the table is 405 synodic lunations (439.5 draconic months, about 33 years). It was meant to be recycled and has a periodic correction scheme. The starting date is in the eighth century and has corrections allowing it to be used up to the eighteenth century. The table also relates eclipses and lunar phenomena to the cycles of Venus, possibly Mercury and other celestial and seasonal phenomena. Such a table let the Maya predict when an eclipse would occur somewhere, though the eclipse seen from their place could not actually be predicted by the codex.

An eclipse can occur when the Moon's orbit crosses the ecliptic. This happens twice a year and is referred to as the ascending or descending node. An eclipse can occur during a period 18 days before or after an ascending or descending node. This is an Eclipse season. Three entry dates in the Dresden Codex eclipse table give the eclipse season for November – December 755.

The Madrid Codex

The observations of eclipses were recorded in the Madrid Codex almanac. Pages 10a – 13a of the Madrid Codex are an eclipse almanac similar to the one in the Dresden Codex. The table is concerned with rain, drought, the agricultural cycle and how these correspond with eclipses. These eclipses probably correspond to the eclipses in the Dresden Codex (the eighth or ninth century).

Despite the similarity of table to the Dresden Codex, the Madrid Codex’s emphasis on visible eclipses, however, are more obvious than the Dresden Codex. Especially, the eclipse pairs that were seen in high magnitude from Yucatan were highlighted in the Madrid Codex. Such multiple eclipses shown in the almanac suggest their interest in eclipse pairs.In 15th century, the eclipses that were visible in Yucatan match the list of eclipses in the Madrid Codex almanac, agreeing with the estimated date of the codex.

The Paris Codex

The Katun Pages (pages 2–11) in the Paris Codex are concerned with the rituals to be performed at Katun completions. They also contain references to historical astronomical events during the fifth to the eighth centuries. These include eclipses, references to Venus and the relationship of Venus to named constellations.

Inscriptions

Santa Elena Poco Uinic Stela 3 has the Mesoamerican long count date of 9.17.19.13.16 5 K'ib' 14 Ch'en inscribed with a Maya glyph of a total solar eclipse, a unique record in the Maya region.

Lord Kan II of Caracol had altar 21 installed in the center of a ball court. It has inscriptions that mark important dates of the accomplishments of his ancestor Lord Water and himself. Lord Kan II used the dates of important astronomical phenomena for these. For example:

9.5.19.1.2 9 Ik 5 Uo – April 14, 553, total lunar eclipse – Accession of Lord Water, grandfather of Kan II
9.6.8.4.2 7 Ik 0 Zip – April 27, 562, annular solar eclipse 8 days ago and penumbral lunar eclipse in 7 days – Star war to Tikal
9.7.19.10.0 1 Ahau 3 Pop – March 13, 593, partial solar eclipse five days ago – Ball game

=== The stars ===
The Maya identified 13 constellations along the ecliptic. These are the content of an almanac in the Paris Codex. Each of these was associated with an animal. These animal representations are pictured in two almanacs in the Madrid Codex where they are related to other astronomical phenomena – eclipses and Venus – and Haab rituals.

Paris Codex

Pages 21–24 of the Paris Codex are a zodiacal almanac. It is made up of five rows of 364 days each. Each row is divided into 13 subdivisions of 28 days each. Its iconography consists of animals, including a scorpion suspended from a skyband and eclipse glyphs. It dates from the eighth century.

Madrid Codex

The longest almanac in the Madrid codex (pages 65–72,73b) is a compendium of information about agriculture, ceremonies, rituals and other matters. Astronomical information includes references to eclipses, the synodic cycles of Venus and zodiacal constellations. The almanac dates to the middle of the fifteenth century.

=== The Milky Way ===
The Milky Way appears as a hazy band of faint stars. It is the disc of our own galaxy, viewed edge-on from within it. It appears as a 10°-wide band of diffuse light passing all the way around the sky. It crosses the ecliptic at a high angle. Its most prominent feature is a large dust cloud that forms a dark rift in its southern and western part.

There is no almanac in the codices that refers specifically to the Milky Way but there are references to it in almanacs concerned with other phenomena.

=== Precession of the equinoxes ===
The equinoxes move westward along the ecliptic relative to the fixed stars, opposite to the yearly motion of the Sun along the ecliptic, returning to the same position approximately every 26,000 years.

The "Serpent Numbers" in the Dresden Codex pp. 61–69 is a table of dates written in the coils of undulating serpents. Beyer was the first to notice that the Serpent Series is based on an unusually long distance number of 1.18.1.8.0.16 (5,482,096 days – more than 15,000 years). Grofe believes that this interval is quite close to a whole multiple of the sidereal year, returning the sun to precisely the same position against the background of stars. He proposes that this is an observation of the precession of the equinoxes and that the serpent series shows how the Maya calculated this by observing the sidereal position of total lunar eclipses at fixed points within the tropical year. Bricker and Bricker think that he based this on misinterpretation of the epigraphy and give their reasons in Astronomy in the Maya Codices.

== Bibliography ==
- Aveni, Anthony F. (2001). Skywatchers (originally published as: Skywatchers of Ancient Mexico [1980], revised and updated ed.). Austin: University of Texas Press. ISBN 0-292-70504-2. OCLC 45195586.
- Aveni, Anthony F. (1997). Stairways to the Stars - Skywatching in Three Ancient Cultures. New York, Chichester, Weinheim, Brisbane, Singapore, Toronto: John Wiley & Sons, Inc. ISBN 0-471-32976-2.
- Aveni, Anthony F. (May–June 1979). "Venus and the Maya: Interdisciplinary studies of Maya myth, building orientations, and written records indicate that astronomers of the pre-Columbian world developed a sophisticated, if distinctive, cosmology". American Scientist. 67 (3). Sigma Xi, The Scientific Research Society: 274–285. Bibcode:1979AmSci..67..274A. JSTOR 27849219. (subscription required)
- Bricker, Harvey M.; Bricker, Victoria R. (2011). Astronomy in the Maya Codices. Philadelphia: American Philosophical Society. ISBN 978-0-87169-265-8.
- Chambers, David Wade (Autumn 1965). "Did the Maya Know the Metonic Cycle?". Isis. 56 (3). The University of Chicago Press on behalf of The History of Science Society: 348–351. doi:10.1086/350004. JSTOR 228110. S2CID 145711182. (subscription required)
- DeMeis, Salvo (December 30, 2014). Heliacal Phenomena: An Astronomical Introduction for Humanists. Mimesis International. ISBN 978-88-575-1634-9.
- Edmonson, Munro S. (1988). The Book of the Year MIDDLE AMERICAN CALENDRICAL SYSTEMS. Salt Lake City: University of Utah Press. ISBN 0-87480-288-1.
- Förstemann, Ernst (1906). Commentary on the Maya Manuscript in the Royal Public Library of Dresden. Cambridge, Massachusetts: Peabody Museum. ISBN 0-543-76539-3.
- Fuls, Andreas (2007). "The Calculation of the Lunar Series on Classic Maya Monuments". Ancient Mesoamerica. 18 (2): 273–282. doi:10.1017/S0956536107000168. S2CID 56198457.
- Grofe, Michael John. "The Serpent Series: Precession in the Maya Dresden Codex" (PDF). Office of Graduate Studies of the University of California: 43–72.
- Martin, Frederick (March 1993). "A Dresden Codex Eclipse Sequence: Projections for the Years 1970-1992". Latin American Antiquity. 4 (1). Society for American Archaeology: 74–93. doi:10.2307/972138. JSTOR 972138. S2CID 164077905. (subscription required)
- Meeus, Jean (2009). Astronomical Algorithms 2nd ed. Richmond, Virginia: Willmann-Bell. ISBN 978-0-943396-61-3.
- Merrill, Robert H. (July 1946). "A Graphical Approach to Some Problems in Maya Astronomy". American Antiquity. 12 (1). Society for American Archaeology: 35–46. doi:10.2307/275812. JSTOR 275812. S2CID 164076035. (subscription required)
- Merrill, Robert H. (July 1947). "A Note on the Maya Venus Table". American Antiquity. 13 (1). Society for American Archaeology: 82–85. doi:10.2307/275759. JSTOR 275759. S2CID 164080893. (subscription required)
- Merrill, Robert H. (January 1949). "The Maya Eclipse Table of the Dresden Codex: A Reply". American Antiquity. 14 (3). Society for American Archaeology: 228–230. doi:10.2307/275605. JSTOR 275605. S2CID 163231165. (subscription required)
- Milbrath, Susan (1999). "Stars, the Milky Way, Comets, and Meteors" (PDF). Star Gods of the Maya: Astronomy in Art, Folklore, and Calendars. Austin, Texas, US: University of Texas Press. pp. 249–293. ISBN 0-292-75225-3. OCLC 40848420 – via Project MUSE.
- Satterthwaite, Linton (January 1949). "The Dark Phase of the Moon and Ancient Maya Methods of Solar Eclipse Prediction". American Antiquity. 14 (3). Society for American Archaeology: 230–234. doi:10.2307/275606. JSTOR 275606. S2CID 163579437. (subscription required)
- Saturno, William A.; David Stuart; Anthony F. Aveni; Franco Rossi (11 May 2012). "Ancient Maya Astronomical Tables from Xultun, Guatemala". Science. New Series. 336 (6082). American Association for the Advancement of Science: 714–717. Bibcode:2012Sci...336..714S. doi:10.1126/science.1221444. JSTOR 41584795. PMID 22582260. S2CID 27369143. (subscription required)
- Šprajc, Ivan (1996). La estrella de Quetzalcóatl: El planeta Venus en Mesoamérica (PDF). Mexico City: Diana. ISBN 968-13-2947-3.
- Tedlock, Dennis; Barbara Tedlock (July–August 1993). "A Mayan Reading of the Story of the Stars". Archaeology. 46 (4). Archaeological Institute of America: 33–35. JSTOR 41771053. (subscription required)
- Thompson, J. Eric S. (1960). Maya Hieroglyphic Writing: An Introduction. Civilization of the American Indian Series, No. 56 (3rd ed.). Norman: University of Oklahoma Press. ISBN 0-8061-0447-3. OCLC 275252.
- Thompson, J. E. S. (2 May 1974). "Maya Astronomy". Philosophical Transactions of the Royal Society of London. Series A, Mathematical and Physical Sciences. 276 (1257, The Place of Astronomy in the Ancient World). The Royal Society: 83–98. Bibcode:1974RSPTA.276...83T. doi:10.1098/rsta.1974.0011. JSTOR 74276. S2CID 202574557. (subscription required)
- Wertime, Richard A. Wertime; Angela M. H. Schuster (July–August 1993). "Celestial Origin of Maya Creation Myth". Archaeology. 46 (4). Archaeological Institute of America: 26–30, 32. JSTOR 41771051. (subscription required)
- Zaro, Gregory; Jon C. Lohse (March 2005). "Agricultural Rhythms and Rituals: Ancient Maya Solar Observation in Hinterland Blue Creek, Northwestern Belize". Latin American Antiquity. 16 (1). Society for American Archaeology: 81–98. doi:10.2307/30042487. JSTOR 30042487. S2CID 44947664. (subscription required)
