= Maya script =

Writing system of the Maya civilization

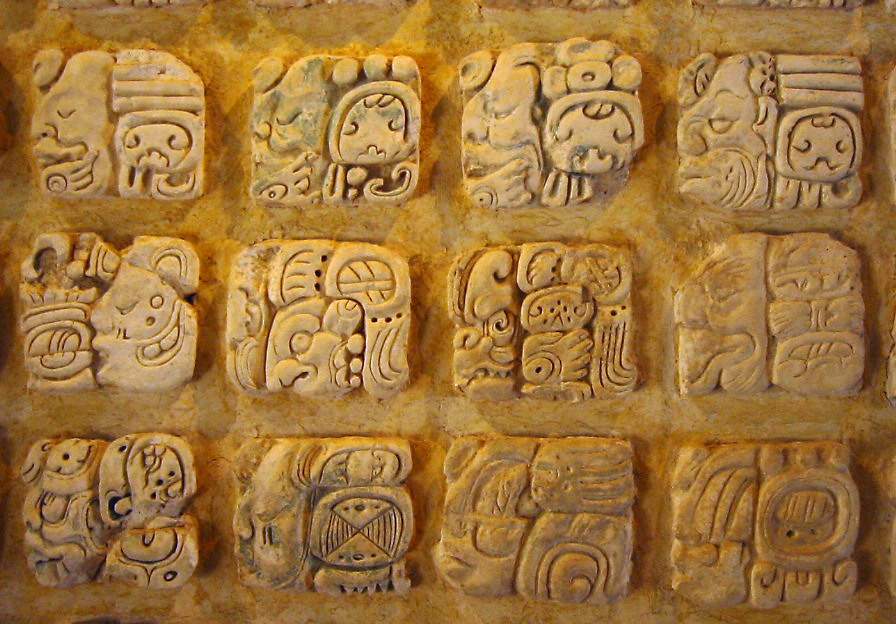
- Maya glyphs were highly complex and often carved into stone.
- Script type: Logosyllabic
- Period: 3rd century BCE to 16th century CE
- Direction: Mixed
- Languages: Ch'olti' (Classic Maya); Yucatec Maya

Related scripts
- Parent systems: Isthmian script?: Maya script
- Sister systems: Zapotec script?

ISO 15924
- ISO 15924: Maya (090), Mayan hieroglyphs

Unicode
- Unicode range: SMP (tentative range U+15500–U+159FF)

Maya script, also known as Maya glyphs, is historically the native writing system of the Maya civilization of Mesoamerica and is the only Mesoamerican writing system that has been substantially deciphered. The earliest inscriptions found which are identifiably Maya date to the 3rd century BCE in late Preclassic sites like Chakjobon (Mexico) and San Bartolo (Guatemala). Maya writing was in continuous use throughout the Maya Lowlands until the Spanish conquest of the Maya in the 16th and 17th centuries but knowledge of it was strictly reserved to the elite. Though modern Mayan languages are almost entirely written using the Latin alphabet rather than Maya script, there have been recent developments encouraging a revival of the Maya glyph system, however, historically, the Maya script was not the writing system of all Mayan languages.

Maya writing was used to write the extinct Classic Maya language spoken in the Maya Lowlands and, during the Postclassic period in northern Yucatán it was also used to write Yucatec Maya. It used logograms complemented with a set of syllabic glyphs, somewhat similar in function to modern Japanese writing. Maya writing was called "hieroglyphics" or hieroglyphs by early European explorers of the 18th and 19th centuries who found its general appearance reminiscent of Egyptian hieroglyphs, although the two systems are unrelated.

== Languages ==
The Maya script was used in the Maya Lowlands primarly in the Classic period of the Maya Civilization to write Classic Maya, a literary form of the extinct Chʼoltiʼ language. This is the language written by the ancient scribes—usually members of the Maya priesthood—in Classic period stelae and monuments. With the Classic Maya collapse the use of the Maya script declined significantly and disappeared entirely in the Central and Southern Lowlands. The script continued to be used extensively during the Postclassic period in Northern Yucatán to write Yucatec Maya (maayat’aan) with some ch'olan elements, its most recognized texts being the surviving Maya codices from Yucatán like the Dresde, Madrid and Paris.

Not all Mayan languages used or shared the Maya script. Outside the Maya Lowlands, the Quichean languages like K’iche and Kaqchikel used the Mixteca-Puebla style from central Mexico instead, based on pictographic recording.

== Structure ==
Two different ways of writing the word bʼalam 'jaguar' in the Maya script – first, as a logogram representing the entire word with the single glyph bʼalam, and then, phonetically using the three syllable signs bʼa, la, and ma
Three ways to write bʼalam using combinations of the logogram with the syllabic signs as phonetic complements. From left to right: bʼa-bʼalam, bʼalam-ma, and bʼa-bʼalam-ma

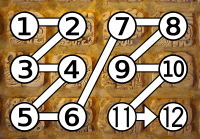
Maya inscriptions were most often written in columns two glyphs wide, with each successive pair of columns read left to right, top to bottom

Mayan writing consisted of a relatively elaborate and complex set of glyphs, which were laboriously painted on ceramics, walls and bark-paper codices, carved in wood or stone, and molded in stucco. Carved and molded glyphs were painted, but the paint has rarely survived. As of 2008, the sound of about 80% of Maya writing could be read and the meaning of about 60% could be understood with varying degrees of certainty, enough to give a comprehensive idea of its structure.

Maya texts were usually written in blocks arranged in columns two blocks wide, with each block corresponding to a noun or verb phrase. The blocks within the columns were read left to right, top to bottom, and would be repeated until there were no more columns left. Within a block, glyphs were arranged top-to-bottom and left-to-right (similar to Korean Hangul syllabic blocks). Glyphs were sometimes conflated into ligatures, where an element of one glyph would replace part of a second. In place of the standard block configuration, Maya was also sometimes written in a single row or column, or in an 'L' or 'T' shape. These variations most often appeared when they would better fit the surface being inscribed.

The Maya script was a logosyllabic system with some syllabogrammatic elements. Individual glyphs or symbols could represent either a morpheme or a syllable, and the same glyph could often be used for both. Because of these dual readings, it is customary to write logographic readings in all caps and phonetic readings in italics or bold. For example, a calendaric glyph can be read as the morpheme manikʼ or as the syllable chi.

Glyphs used as syllabograms were originally logograms for single-syllable words, usually those that ended in a vowel or in a weak consonant such as y, w, h, or glottal stop. For example, the logogram for 'fish fin'—found in two forms, as a fish fin and as a fish with prominent fins—was read as [kah] and came to represent the syllable ka. These syllabic glyphs performed two primary functions: as phonetic complements to disambiguate logograms which had more than one reading (similar to ancient Egyptian and modern Japanese furigana); and to write grammatical elements such as verbal inflections which did not have dedicated logograms (similar to Japanese okurigana). For example, bʼalam 'jaguar' could be written as a single logogram, bʼalam; a logogram with syllable additions, as ba-bʼalam, or bʼalam-ma, or bʼa-bʼalam-ma; or written completely phonetically with syllabograms as bʼa-la-ma.

In addition, some syllable glyphs were homophones, such as the six different glyphs used to write the very common third person pronoun u-.

=== Harmonic and disharmonic echo vowels ===
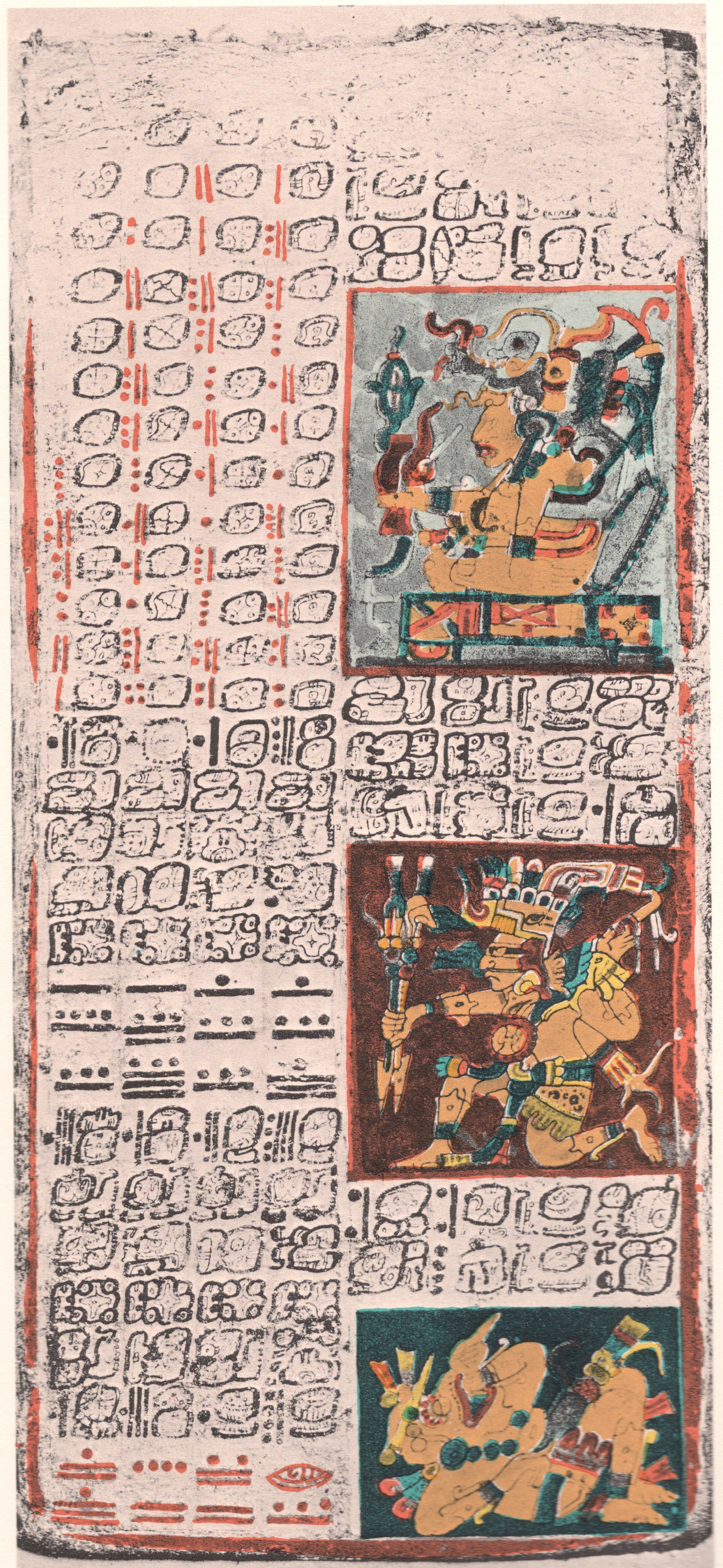
Yucatec Maya writing in the Dresden Codex, c. 11–12th century, Chichen Itza

Phonetic glyphs stood for simple consonant-vowel (CV) or vowel-only (V) syllables. However, Mayan phonotactics is slightly more complicated than this. Most Mayan words end with consonants, and there may be sequences of two consonants within a word as well, as in xolteʼ ([ʃolteʔ] 'scepter') which is CVCCVC. When these final consonants were sonorants (l, m, n) or gutturals (j, h, ʼ) they were sometimes ignored ("underspelled"). More often, final consonants were written, which meant that an extra vowel was written as well. This was typically an "echo" vowel that repeated the vowel of the previous syllable. For example, the word [kah] 'fish fin' would be underspelled ka or written in full as ka-ha. However, there are many cases where some other vowel was used, and the orthographic rules for this are only partially understood; this is largely due to the difficulty in ascertaining whether this vowel may be due to an underspelled suffix.

Lacadena & Wichmann (2004) proposed the following conventions:

- A CVC syllable was written CV-CV, where the two vowels (V) were the same: yo-po for yop [jop] 'leaf'
- A syllable with a long vowel (CVVC) was written CV-Ci, unless the long vowel was [i], in which case it was written CiCa: ba-ki for baak [ɓaːk] 'captive', yi-tzi-na for yihtziin [jiht͡siːn] 'younger brother'
- A syllable with a glottalized vowel (CVʼC or CVʼVC) was written with a final a if the vowel was [e, o, u], or with a final u if the vowel was [a] or [i]: hu-na for huʼn [huˀn] 'paper', ba-tzʼu for baʼtsʼ [ɓaˀt͡sʼ] 'howler monkey'.
- Preconsonantal [h] is not indicated.

In short, if the vowels are the same (harmonic), a simple vowel is intended. If the vowels are not the same (disharmonic), either two syllables are intended (likely underspelled), or else a single syllable with a long vowel (if V_{1} = [a e? o u] and V_{2} = [i], or else if V_{1} = [i] and V_{2} = [a]) or with a glottalized vowel (if V_{1} = [e? o u] and V_{2} = [a], or else if V_{1} = [a i] and V_{2} = [u]). The long-vowel reading of [Ce-Ci] is still uncertain, and there is a possibility that [Ce-Cu] represents a glottalized vowel (if it is not simply an underspelling for [CeCuC]), so it may be that the disharmonies form natural classes: [i] for long non-front vowels, otherwise [a] to keep it disharmonic; [u] for glottalized non-back vowels, otherwise [a].

A more complex spelling is ha-o-bo ko-ko-no-ma for [haʼoʼb kohknoʼm] 'they are the guardians'. (Note: Vowel length and glottalization are not always indicated in common words like 'they are'.) A minimal set is,

- ba-ka for bak
- ba-ki for baak
- ba-ku for baʼk or baʼak
- ba-ke for baakel (underspelled)
- ba-ke-le for baakel

=== Verbal inflections ===
Despite depending on consonants which were frequently not written, the Mayan voice system was reliably indicated. For instance, the paradigm for a transitive verb with a CVC root is as follows:

Verbal inflections in Mayan writing
Voice	Transliteration	Transcription	Gloss
Active	u-tzutz-wa	utzutzuw	"(s)he finished it"
Passive	tzutz-tza-ja	tzu[h]tzaj	"it was finished"
Mediopassive	tzutz-yi	tzutzuy	"it got finished"
Antipassive	tzutz-wi	tzutzuw	"(s)he finished"
Participial	tzutz-li	tzutzul	"finished"

The active suffix did not participate in the harmonic/disharmonic system seen in roots, but rather was always -wa.

However, the language changed over 1500 years, and there were dialectal differences as well, which are reflected in the script, as seen next for the verb "(s)he sat" (⟨h⟩ is an infix in the root chum for the passive voice):

Change in passive voice for chum
Period	Transliteration	Transcription
Late Preclassic	chum?	chu[h]m?
Early Classic	chum-ja	chu[h]m-aj
Classic (Eastern Chʼolan)	chum[mu]la-ja	chum-l-aj
Late Classic (Western Chʼolan)	chum[mu]wa-ni	chum-waan

== Emblem glyphs ==
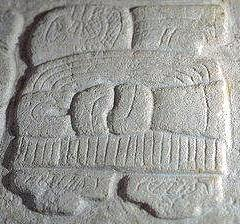
Tikal or "Mutal" Emblem Glyph, Stela 26 in Tikal's Litoteca Museum

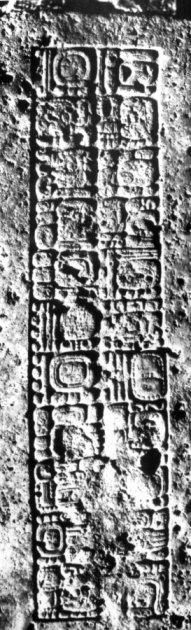
An inscription in Maya glyphs from the site of Naranjo, relating to the reign of king Itzamnaaj Kʼawil, 784–810

An "emblem glyph" is a kind of royal title. It consists of a place name followed by the word ajaw, a Classic Maya term for "lord" with an unclear but well-attested etymology. Sometimes the title is introduced by an adjective kʼuhul ("holy, divine" or "sacred"), resulting in the construction "holy [placename] lord". However, an "emblem glyph" is not a "glyph" at all: it can be spelled with any number of syllabic or logographic signs and several alternative spellings are attested for the words kʼuhul and ajaw, which form the stable core of the title. "Emblem glyph" simply reflects the time when Mayanists could not read Classic Maya inscriptions and used a term to isolate specific recurring structural components of the written narratives, and other remaining examples of Maya orthography.

This title was identified in 1958 by Heinrich Berlin, who coined the term "emblem glyph". Berlin noticed that the "emblem glyphs" consisted of a larger "main sign" and two smaller signs now read as kʼuhul ajaw. Berlin also noticed that while the smaller elements remained relatively constant, the main sign changed from site to site. Berlin proposed that the main signs identified individual cities, their ruling dynasties, or the territories they controlled. Subsequently, Marcus (1976) argued that the "emblem glyphs" referred to archaeological sites, or more so the prominence and standing of the site, broken down in a 5-tiered hierarchy of asymmetrical distribution. Marcus' research assumed that the emblem glyphs were distributed in a pattern of relative site importance depending on broadness of distribution, roughly broken down as follows: Primary regional centers (capitals) (Tikal, Calakmul, and other "superpowers") were generally first in the region to acquire a unique emblem glyph(s). Texts referring to other primary regional centers occur in the texts of these "capitals", and dependencies exist which use the primary center's glyph. Secondary centers (Altun Ha, Lubaantun, Xunantunich, and other mid-sized cities) had their own glyphs but are only rarely mentioned in texts found in the primary regional center, while repeatedly mentioning the regional center in their own texts. Tertiary centers (towns) had no glyphs of their own, but have texts mentioning the primary regional centers and perhaps secondary regional centers on occasion. These were followed by the villages with no emblem glyphs and no texts mentioning the larger centers, and hamlets with little evidence of texts at all. This model was largely unchallenged for over a decade until Mathews and Justeson, as well as Houston, argued once again that the "emblem glyphs" were the titles of Maya rulers with some geographical association.

The debate on the nature of "emblem glyphs" received a new spin in Stuart & Houston (1994). The authors demonstrated that there were many place-names-proper, some real, some mythological, mentioned in the hieroglyphic inscriptions. Some of these place names also appeared in the "emblem glyphs", some were attested in the "titles of origin" (expressions like "a person from Lubaantun"), but some were not incorporated in personal titles at all. Moreover, the authors also highlighted the cases when the "titles of origin" and the "emblem glyphs" did not overlap, building upon Houston's earlier research. Houston noticed that the establishment and spread of the Tikal-originated dynasty in the Petexbatun region was accompanied by the proliferation of rulers using the Tikal "emblem glyph" placing political and dynastic ascendancy above the current seats of rulership. Recent investigations also emphasize the use of emblem glyphs as an emic identifier to shape socio-political self-identity.

== Numerical system ==
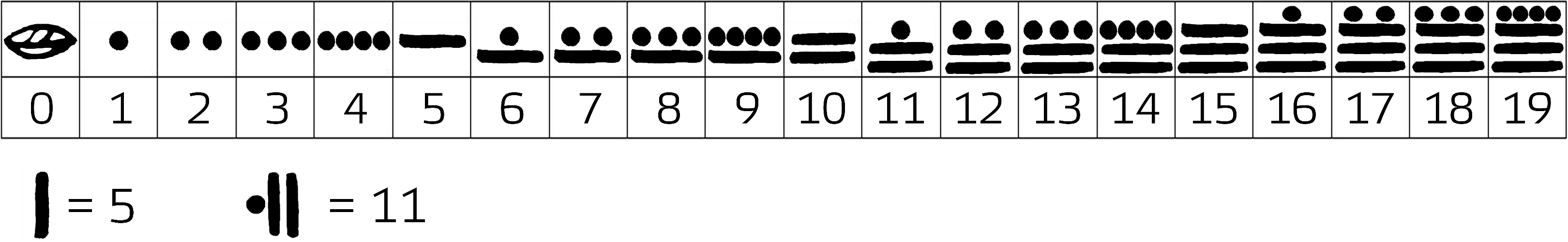
List of Maya numerals from 0 to 19 with underneath two vertically oriented examples

The Mayas used a positional base-twenty (vigesimal) numerical system which only included whole numbers. For simple counting operations, a bar and dot notation was used. The dot represents 1 and the bar represents 5. A shell was used to represent zero. Numbers from 6 to 19 are formed combining bars and dots, and can be written horizontally or vertically.

Numbers over 19 are written vertically and read from the bottom to the top as powers of 20. The bottom number represents numbers from 0 to 20, so the symbol shown does not need to be multiplied. The second line from the bottom represents the amount of 20s there are, so that number is multiplied by 20. The third line from the bottom represents the amount of 400s, so it is multiplied by 400; the fourth by 8000; the fifth by 160,000, etc. Each successive line is an additional power of twenty (similar to how in Arabic numerals, additional powers of 10 are added to the left of the first digit). This positional system allows the calculation of large figures, necessary for chronology and astronomy.

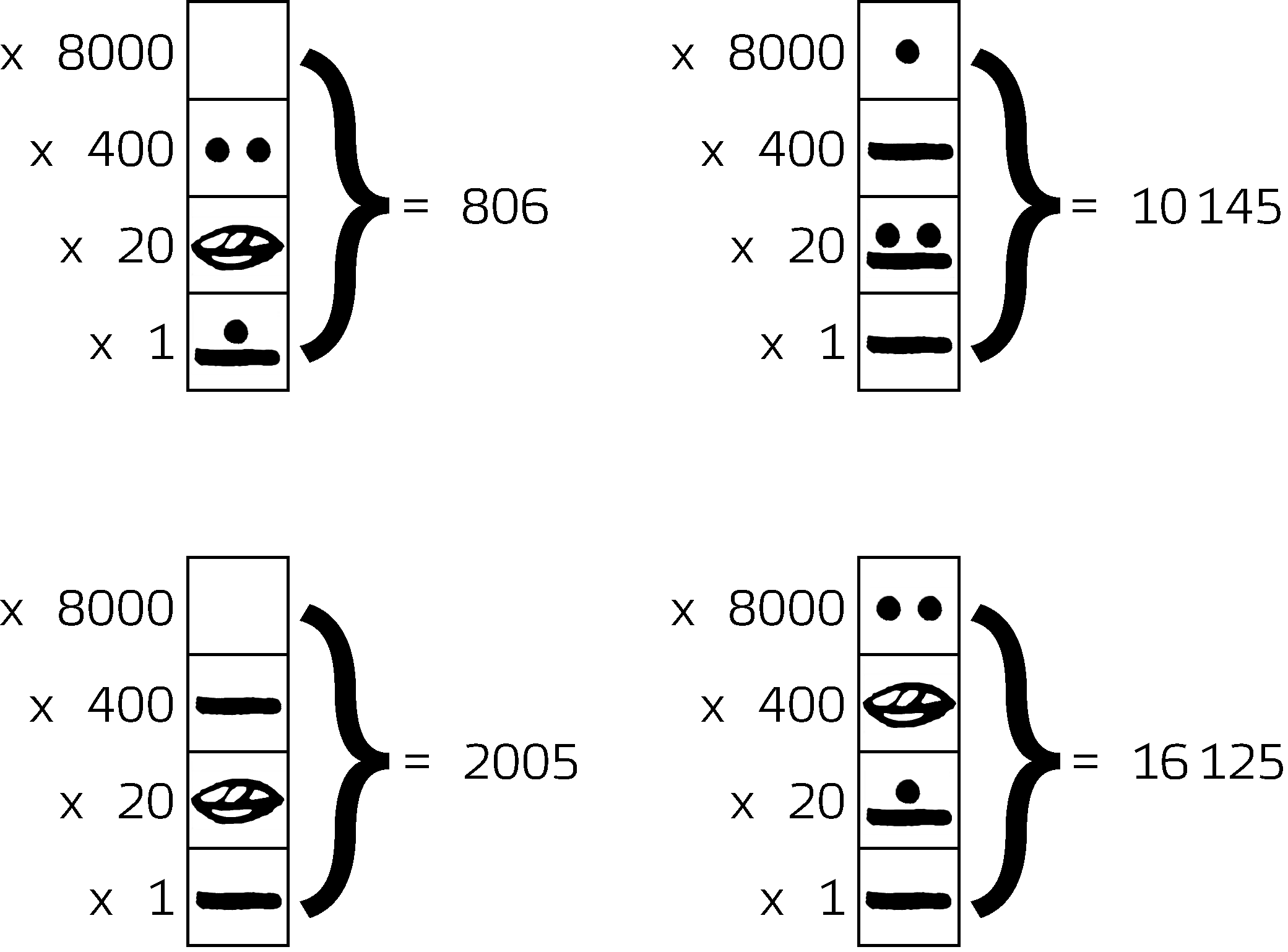
These four examples show how the value of Maya numerals can be calculated.

== History ==
It was thought, until recently, that the Maya may have adopted writing from the Olmec or Epi-Olmec culture, who used the Isthmian script. However, murals excavated in 2005 have pushed back the origin of Maya writing by several centuries, and it now seems possible that the Maya were the ones who invented writing in Mesoamerica. Scholarly consensus is that the Maya developed the only complete writing system in Mesoamerica, even though recently academics have argued that other Mesoamerican writing systems may be more complete than previously thought, such as the Aztec Nahuatl or the Epiolmec writing systems.

Knowledge of the Maya writing system continued into the early colonial era and reportedly a few of the early Spanish priests who went to Yucatán learned it. However, as part of his campaign to eradicate pagan rites, Bishop Diego de Landa ordered the collection and destruction of written Maya works, and a sizable number of Maya codices were destroyed. Later, seeking to use their native language to convert the Maya to Christianity, he derived what he believed to be a Maya "alphabet" (the so-called de Landa alphabet). Although the Maya did not actually write alphabetically, nevertheless he recorded a glossary of Maya sounds and related symbols, which was long dismissed as nonsense (for instance, by leading Mayanist J. E. S. Thompson in his 1950 book Maya Hieroglyphic Writing) but eventually became a key resource in deciphering the Maya script. The difficulty was that there was no simple correspondence between the two systems, and the names of the letters of the Spanish alphabet meant nothing to Landa's Maya scribe, so Landa ended up asking things like write "ha": "hache–a", and glossed a part of the result as "H," which, in reality, was written as a-che-a in Maya glyphs.

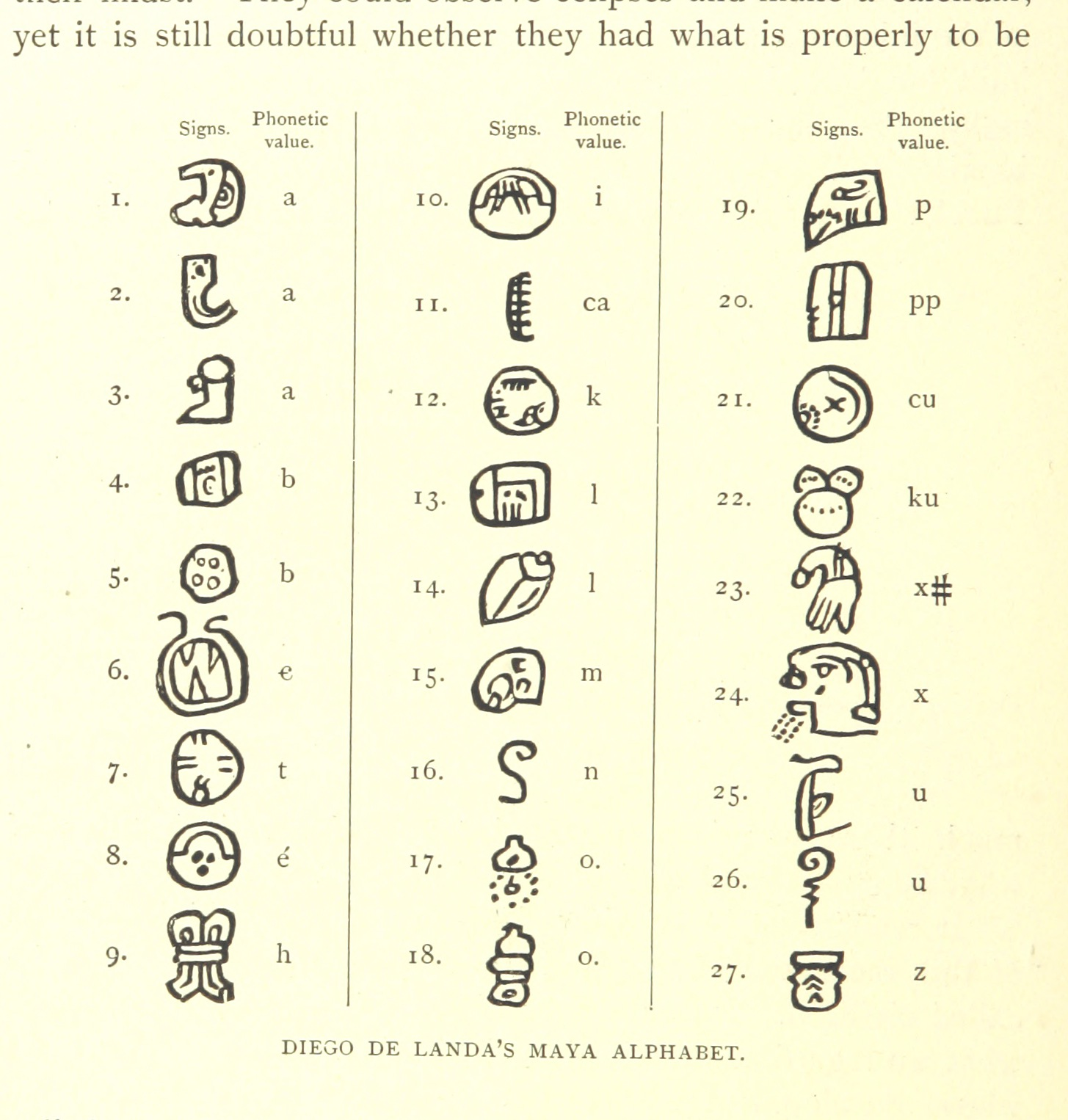
Diego de Landa's Maya alphabet was an early attempt at decipherment.

Landa was also involved in creating an orthography, or a system of writing, for the Yucatec Maya language using the Latin alphabet. This was the first Latin orthography for any of the Mayan languages, which number around thirty.

For many years, only three Maya codices were known to have survived the conquistadors; this was expanded with the 2015 authentication of the Grolier Codex as the fourth. Most surviving texts are found on pottery recovered from Maya tombs, or from monuments and stelae erected in sites which were abandoned or buried before the arrival of the Spanish.

Knowledge of the writing system was lost, probably by the end of the 16th century. Renewed interest in it was sparked by published accounts of ruined Maya sites in the 19th century.

== Decipherment ==
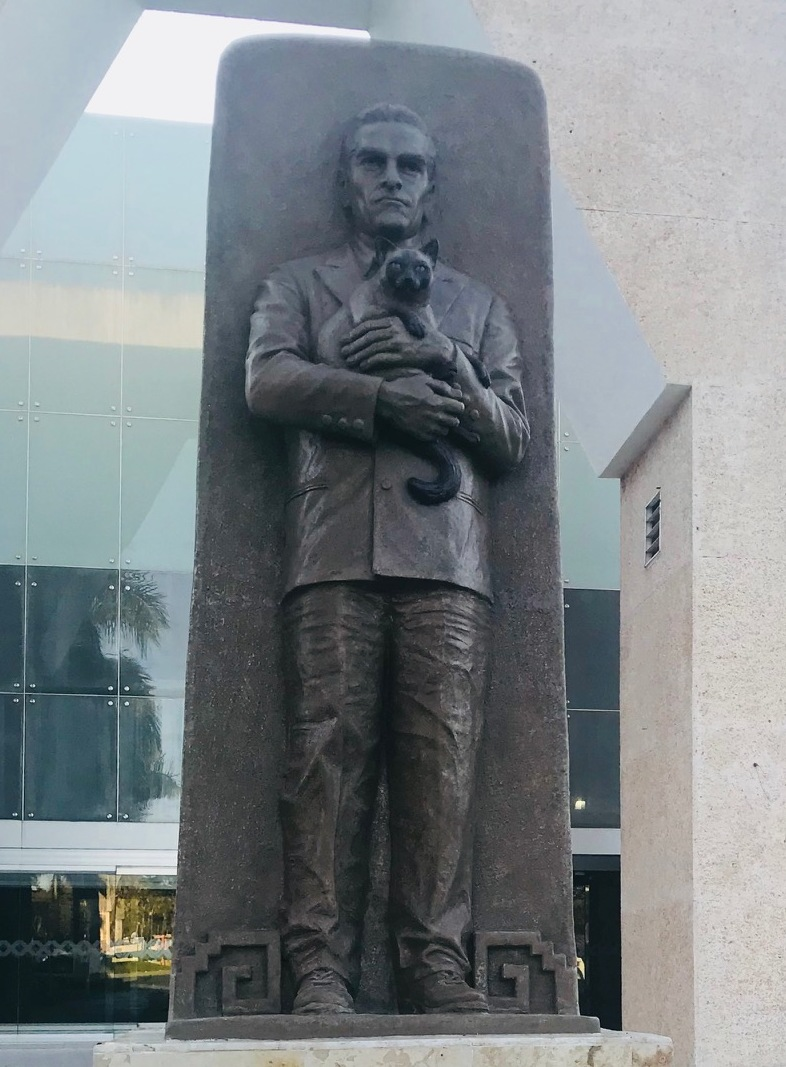
Monument to Yuri Knorozov and his cat Asya in Mérida, Yucatán

Deciphering Maya writing has proven a long and laborious process. 19th-century and early 20th-century investigators managed to decode the Maya numbers and portions of the texts related to astronomy and the Maya calendar, but understanding of most of the rest long eluded scholars. In the 1930s, Benjamin Whorf wrote a number of published and unpublished essays, proposing to identify phonetic elements within the writing system. Although some specifics of his decipherment claims were later shown to be incorrect, the central argument of his work, that Maya hieroglyphs were phonetic (or more specifically, syllabic), was later supported by the work of Yuri Knorozov (1922–1999), who played a major role in deciphering Maya writing. Napoleon Cordy also made some notable contributions in the 1930s and 1940s to the early study and decipherment of Maya script, also arguing for some share of phonetic signs in 1946.

In 1952 Knorozov published the paper "Ancient Writing of Central America", arguing that the so-called "de Landa alphabet" contained in Bishop Diego de Landa's manuscript Relación de las Cosas de Yucatán was made of syllabic, rather than alphabetic symbols. He further improved his decipherment technique in his 1963 monograph "The Writing of the Maya Indians" and published translations of Maya manuscripts in his 1975 work "Maya Hieroglyphic Manuscripts". In the 1960s, progress revealed the dynastic records of Maya rulers. Since the early 1980s scholars have demonstrated that most of the previously unknown symbols form a syllabary, and progress in reading the Maya writing has advanced rapidly since.

As Knorozov's early essays contained several older readings already published in the late 19th century by Cyrus Thomas, and the Soviet editors added propagandistic claims to the effect that Knorozov was using a peculiarly "Marxist-Leninist" approach to decipherment, many Western Mayanists simply dismissed Knorozov's work. However, in the 1960s, more came to see the syllabic approach as potentially fruitful, and possible phonetic readings for symbols whose general meaning was understood from context began to develop. Prominent older epigrapher J. Eric S. Thompson was one of the last major opponents of Knorozov and the syllabic approach. Thompson's disagreements are sometimes said to have held back advances in decipherment. For example, Coe (1992, p. 164) says "the major reason was that almost the entire Mayanist field was in willing thrall to one very dominant scholar, Eric Thompson". Galina Yershova, a student of Knorozov's, stated that reception of Knorozov's work was delayed only by authority of Thompson, and thus has nothing to do with Marxism.

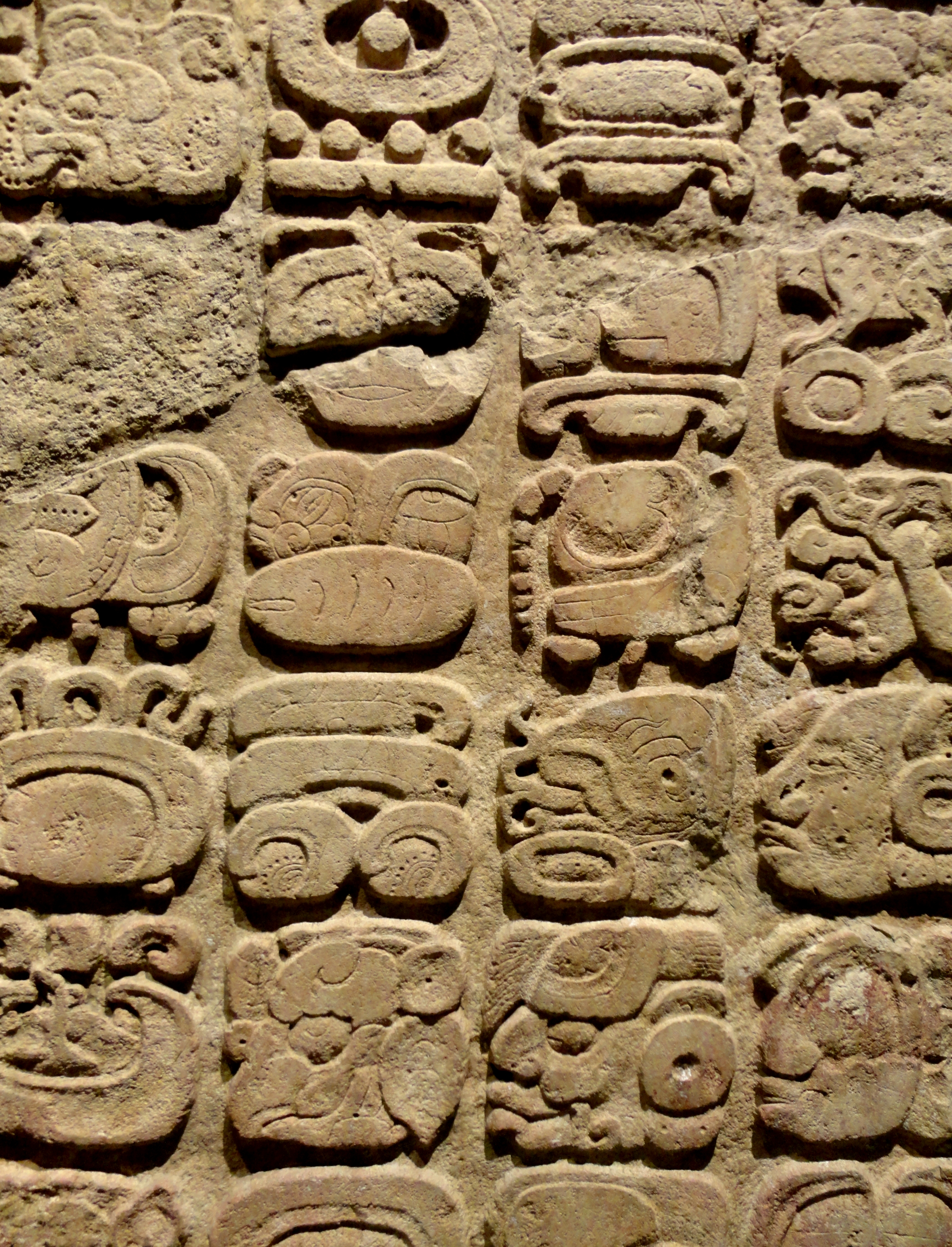
Maya glyphs from Yaxchilan at National Museum of Anthropology (Mexico)

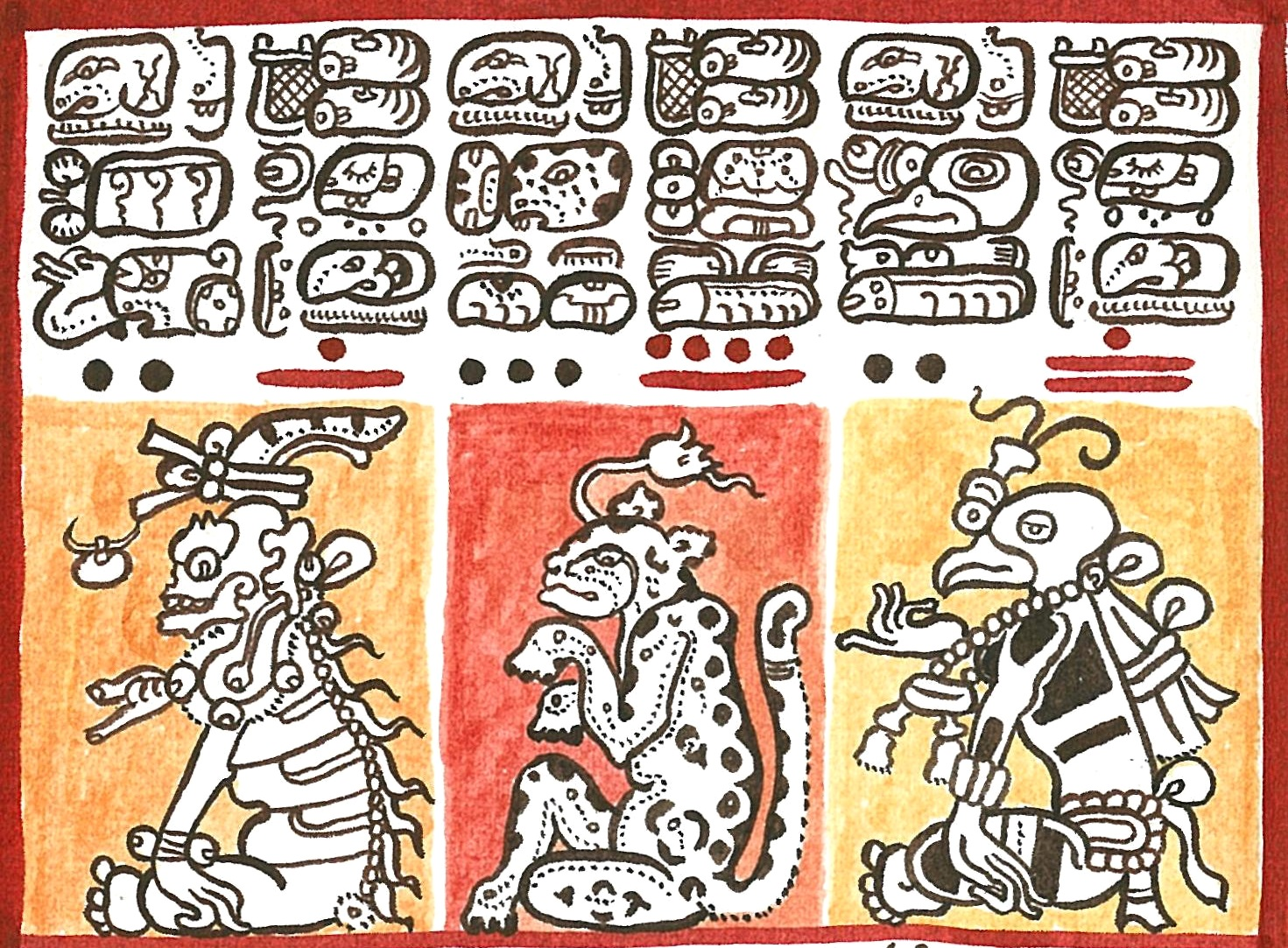
Detail of the Dresden Codex (modern reproduction)

In 1959, examining what she called "a peculiar pattern of dates" on stone monument inscriptions at the Classic Maya site of Piedras Negras, Russian-American scholar Tatiana Proskouriakoff determined that these represented events in the lifespan of an individual, rather than relating to astronomy or prophecy, as held by the "old school" exemplified by Thompson. This proved to be true of many Maya inscriptions, and revealed the Maya epigraphic record to be one relating histories of ruling individuals: dynastic histories similar in nature to those recorded in other human cultures throughout the world.

Although it was then clear what was on many Maya inscriptions, they still could not literally be read. However, further progress was made during the 1960s and 1970s, using a multitude of approaches including pattern analysis, de Landa's "alphabet", Knorozov's breakthroughs, and others. In the story of Maya decipherment, the work of archaeologists, art historians, epigraphers, linguists, and anthropologists cannot be separated. All contributed to a process that was truly and essentially multidisciplinary. Key figures included David Kelley, Ian Graham, Gilette Griffin, and Michael Coe.

A new wave of breakthroughs occurred in the early 1970s, in particular at the first Mesa Redonda de Palenque, a scholarly conference organized by Merle Greene Robertson at the Maya site of Palenque and held in December, 1973. A working group consisting of Linda Schele, then a studio artist and art instructor, Floyd Lounsbury, a linguist from Yale, and Peter Mathews, then an undergraduate student of David Kelley's at the University of Calgary (whom Kelley sent because he could not attend). In one afternoon they reconstructed most of the dynastic list of Palenque, building on the earlier work of Heinrich Berlin. By identifying a sign as an important royal title (now read as the recurring name Kʼinich), the group was able to identify and read the life histories (from birth, to accession to the throne, to death) of six kings of Palenque. Palenque was the focus of much epigraphic work through the late 1970s, but linguistic decipherment of texts remained very limited.

From that point, progress proceeded rapidly. Scholars such as J. Kathryn Josserand, Nick Hopkins and others published findings that helped to construct a Mayan vocabulary. The "old school" continued to resist the results of the new scholarship for some time. A decisive event which helped to turn the tide in favor of the new approach occurred in 1986, at an exhibition entitled "The Blood of Kings: A New Interpretation of Maya Art", organized by InterCultura and the Kimbell Art Museum and curated by Schele and by Yale art historian Mary Miller. This exhibition and its attendant catalogue—and international publicity—revealed to a wide audience the history which had latterly been opened up by progress in decipherment of Maya hieroglyphics. Not only could a history of ancient America now be read and understood, but it helped to connect the material remains of the [...] to what had been written about the recorded individuals; they were now re-evaluated as a people with a history like that of all other human societies: with wars, dynastic struggles, shifting political alliances, complex religious and artistic systems, expressions of personal property and ownership and the like. Moreover, the new interpretation, as the exhibition demonstrated, made sense out of many works of art whose meaning had been unclear and showed how the material culture of the Maya represented a fully integrated cultural system and world-view. The old Thompson view of the Maya as peaceable astronomers without conflict or other attributes characteristic of most human societies was no longer applicable.

However, three years later, in 1989, supporters who continued to resist the modern decipherment interpretation made their last argument against it. This occurred at a conference at Dumbarton Oaks. It did not directly attack the methodology or results of decipherment, but instead contended that the ancient Maya texts had indeed been read but were "epiphenomenal". This argument was extended from a populist perspective to say that the deciphered texts tell only about the concerns and beliefs of the society's elite, and not about the ordinary Maya. In opposition to this idea, Michael Coe described "epiphenomenal" as "a ten penny word meaning that Maya writing is only of marginal application since it is secondary to those more primary institutions—economics and society—so well studied by the dirt archaeologists." Linda Schele noted following the conference that this is like saying that the inscriptions of ancient Egypt—or the writings of Greek philosophers or historians—do not reveal anything important about their cultures.

Over 90 percent of the Maya texts can now be read with reasonable accuracy. As of 2020, at least one phonetic glyph was known for each of the syllables marked green in this chart. /tʼ/ is rare. /pʼ/ is not found, and is thought to have been a later innovation in the Ch'olan and Yucatecan languages.

Syllables for which at least one phonetic glyph has been found
	(ʼ)	b	ch	chʼ	h	j	k	kʼ	l	m	n	p	s	t	tʼ	tz	tzʼ	w	x	y	
a	Yes	Yes	Yes	Yes	Yes	Yes	Yes	Yes	Yes	Yes	Yes	Yes	Yes	Yes	No	Yes	Yes	Yes	Yes	Yes	a
e	Yes	Yes	Yes	?	Yes	Yes	Yes	Yes	Yes	Yes	Yes	Yes	Yes	Yes	No	Yes	?	Yes	?	Yes	e
i	Yes	Yes	Yes	No	Yes	Yes	Yes	Yes	Yes	Yes	Yes	Yes	Yes	Yes	No	Yes	Yes	Yes	Yes	Yes	i
o	Yes	Yes	Yes	Yes	Yes	Yes	Yes	Yes	Yes	Yes	Yes	Yes	?	Yes	Yes	No	Yes	Yes	Yes	Yes	o
u	Yes	Yes	Yes	No	Yes	Yes	Yes	Yes	Yes	Yes	Yes	Yes	Yes	Yes	Yes	Yes	Yes	?	Yes	Yes	u

== Syllables ==
Syllables are in the form of consonant + vowel. The top line contains individual vowels. In the left column are the consonants with their pronunciation instructions. The apostrophe ' represents the glottal stop. There are different variations of the same character in the table cell. Blank cells are bytes whose characters are not yet known.

	Main Glyphs						Affixable Glyphs				
	-a	-e	-i	-o	-u		-a	-e	-i	-o	-u
- /ʔ/						- /ʔ/					
b- /ɓ/						b- /ɓ/					
ch- /t͡ʃ/						ch- /t͡ʃ/					
ch’- /t͡ʃʼ/						ch’- /t͡ʃʼ/					
h- /h/						h- /h/					
j- /x/						j- /x/					
k- /k/						k- /k/					
k’- /k’/						k’- /k’/					
l- /l/						l- /l/					
m- /m/						m- /m/					
n- /n/						n- /n/					
p- /p/						p- /p/					
s- /s/						s- /s/					
t- /t/						t- /t/					
t’- /t’/						t’- /t’/					
tz- /t͡s/						tz- /t͡s/					
tz’- /t͡sʼ/						tz’- /t͡sʼ/					
w- /w/						w- /w/					
x- /ʃ/						x- /ʃ/					
y- /j/						y- /j/					
	-a	-e	-i	-o	-u		-a	-e	-i	-o	-u

== Example ==
Tomb of Kʼinich Janaabʼ Pakal:

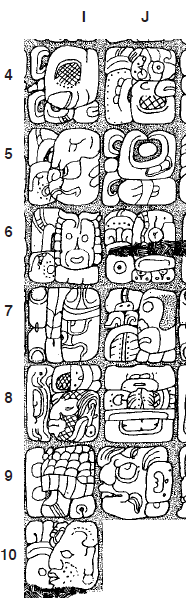
maya exx

Transcription
Row	Glyphs		Reading	
Row	I	J	I	J
4	ya k’a wa	ʔu(?) K’UH hu lu	yak’aw	ʔuk’uhul
5	PIK	1-WINAAK-ki	pik	juʔn winaak
6	pi xo ma	ʔu SAK hu na la	pixoʔm	ʔusak hunal
7	ʔu-ha	YAX K’AHK’ K’UH?	ʔuʔh	Yax K’ahk’ K’uh?
8	ʔu tu pa	K’UH? ?	ʔutuʔp	k’uh(ul)? ...l
9	ʔu KOʔHAW wa	?[CHAAK] ...m	ʔukoʔhaw	Chaahk (‘GI’)
10	SAK BALUʔN	–	Sak Baluʔn	–

Text: Yak’aw ʔuk’uhul pik juʔn winaak pixoʔm ʔusak hunal ʔuʔh Yax K’ahk’ K’uh(?) ʔutuʔp k’uh(ul)? ...l ʔukoʔhaw Chaahk (‘GI’) Sak Baluʔn.
Translation: «He gave the god clothing, [consisted of] twenty one headgears, white ribbon, necklace, First Fire God’s earrings and God’s quadrilateral badge helmet, to Chaahk Sak-Balun».

== Revival ==
In recent times, there has been an increased interest in reviving usage of the script. Various works have recently been both transliterated and created into the script, notably the transcription of the Popol Vuh, a record of Kʼicheʼ religion, in 2018. Another example is the sculpting and writing of a modern stele placed at Iximche in 2012, describing the full historical record of the site dating back to the beginning of the Mayan long count. However, the Maya script was never used by the pre-Columbian K’iche’ and Kaqchikel people, instead, they used the Mixteca-Puebla style from central Mexico. The 2014 poem "Cigarra", by Martín Gómez Ramírez, was written entirely in Tzeltal using the script.

== Computer encoding ==
There is a custom downloadable primer font for the Maya script. The script has yet to be added to the Unicode standard, but has been provisionally assigned for inclusion in an upcoming version in the range U+15500–U+156EF, as well as an additional block for format controls at U+156F0–U+1570F. Another range is reserved for a Mayan Hieroglyphs Extended-A block, which will cover classical Maya.

The goal of encoding Maya hieroglyphs in Unicode is to facilitate the modern use of the script. For representing the degree of flexibility and variation of classical Maya, the expressiveness of Unicode is insufficient (e.g., with regard to the representation of infixes, i.e., signs inserted into other signs), so, for philological applications, different technologies are required. However, The aforementioned proposal is nonetheless underway for its inclusion, and it is not yet clear how these complexities will be handled.

The Mayan numerals, with values 0–19_{10} creating a base-20 system, are encoded in block Mayan Numerals.

== Bibliography ==
- Coe, Michael D.; Van Stone, Mark L (2005). Reading the Maya Glyphs. London: Thames & Hudson. ISBN 978-0-500-28553-4.
- Coe, Michael D. (1992). Breaking the Maya Code. London: Thames & Hudson. ISBN 0-500-05061-9.
- Gronemeyer, Sven (2012). "Statements of Identity: Emblem Glyphs in the Nexus of Political Relations". In Jarosław Źrałka; Wiesław Koszkul; Beata Golińska (eds.). Maya Political Relations and Strategies. Proceedings of the 14th European Maya Conference, Cracow, 2009. Contributions in New World Archaeology. Vol. 4. Cracow: Polska Akademia Umiejętności and Uniwersytet Jagielloński. pp. 13–40.
- Guéguen-Leclair, Guy (2012). Écriture maya. L'Alphabet consonantique dans les anciens textes mayas (Research papers).
- Houston, Stephen D. (1993). Hieroglyphs and History at Dos Pilas: Dynastic Politics of the Classic Maya. Austin: University of Texas Press. ISBN 0-292-73855-2.
- Houston, Stephen D. (1986). Problematic Emblem Glyphs: Examples from Altar de Sacrificios, El Chorro, Rio Azul, and Xultun. Research Reports on Ancient Maya Writing, 3. (Mesoweb online facsimile ed.). Washington D.C.: Center for Maya Research. ASIN B0006EOYNY. Archived from the original (PDF) on 2021-02-24.
- Kettunen, Harri; Helmke, Christophe (2020). Introduction to Maya Hieroglyphs (PDF) (in English, Spanish, French, Polish, Danish, Slovak, and Italian). Wayeb.
- Kettunen, Harri; Helmke, Christophe (2025). Introduction to Maya Hieroglyphs (PDF) (in English, Spanish, French, Polish, Danish, Slovak, and Italian). Wayeb.
- Lacadena, Alfonso; Wichmann, Søren (2004). "On the Representation of the Glottal Stop in Maya Writing". The Linguistics of Maya Writing. Salt Lake City: University of Utah Press. pp. 103–162.
- Lacadena García-Gallo, Alfonso; Ciudad Ruiz, Andrés (1998). "Reflexiones sobre la estructura política maya clásica". In Andrés Ciudad Ruiz; Yolanda Fernández Marquínez; José Miguel García Campillo; Maria Josefa Iglesias Ponce de León; Alfonso Lacadena García-Gallo; Luis T. Sanz Castro (eds.). Anatomía de una Civilización: Aproximaciones Interdisciplinarias a la Cultura Maya (in Spanish). Madrid: Sociedad Española de Estudios Mayas. ISBN 84-923545-0-X.
- de Landa, Diego (1566) [From 1958 Porrua edition, with page numbers in parentheses]. Prager, Christian (ed.). "Relacion de las Cosas de Yucatán" (PDF) – via Wayeb.org.
- Lebrun, David (Director) Guthrie, Rosey (producer) (2008). Breaking the Maya Code (Documentary). Night Fire Films. ASIN B001B2U1BE.
- Mathews, Peter (1991). "Classic Maya emblem glyphs". In Culvert, T. Patrick (ed.). Classic Maya Political History: Hieroglyphic and Archaeological Evidence. School of American Research Advanced Seminars. Cambridge and New York: Cambridge University Press. pp. 19–29. ISBN 0-521-39210-1.
- Marcus, Joyce (1976). Emblem and State in the Classic Maya Lowlands: an Epigraphic Approach to Territorial Organization. Dumbarton Oaks Other Titles in Pre-Columbian Studies. Washington D.C.: Dumbarton Oaks Research Library and Collection, Harvard University Press. ISBN 0-88402-066-5.
- McKillop, Heather (2004). The ancient Maya : new perspectives. New York, N.Y.: W. W. Norton & Company, Inc. ISBN 978-0-393-32890-5.
- Montgomery, John (2004). How to Read Maya Hieroglyphs. Hippocrene Practical Dictionaries. New York: Hippocrene Books. ISBN 978-0-7818-1020-3.
- Montgomery, John (2002). Dictionary of Maya Hieroglyphs. New York: Hippocrene Books. ISBN 978-0-7818-0862-0.
- Saturno, William A.; Stuart, David; Beltrán, Boris (3 March 2006). "Early Maya writing at San Bartolo, Guatemala" (PDF Science Express republ.). Science. 311 (5765): 1281–3. Bibcode:2006Sci...311.1281S. doi:10.1126/science.1121745. PMID 16400112. S2CID 46351994.
- Schele, Linda; Miller, Mary Ellen (1992) [1986]. Blood of Kings: Dynasty and Ritual in Maya Art. Justin Kerr (photographer) (reprint ed.). New York: George Braziller. ISBN 0-8076-1278-2.
- Schele, Linda; Freidel, David (1990). A Forest of Kings: The Untold Story of the Ancient Maya. New York: William Morrow. ISBN 0-688-07456-1.
- Soustelle, Jacques (1984). The Olmecs: The Oldest Civilization in Mexico. New York: Doubleday and Co. ISBN 0-385-17249-4.
- Stuart, David; Houston, Stephen D. (1994). Classic Maya Place Names. Dumbarton Oaks Pre-Columbian Art and Archaeology Series. Vol. 33. Washington D.C.: Dumbarton Oaks Research Library and Collection, Harvard University Press. ISBN 0-88402-209-9.
- Tedlock, Dennis (2010). 2000 Years of Mayan Literature. California: University of California Press. ISBN 978-0-520-23221-1.
- Thompson, John Eric Sidney (1978). Maya hieroglyphic writing: An introduction (Civilization of the American Indian series). California: University of Oklahoma Press. ISBN 978-0-8061095-8-9.
- Van Stone, Mark L (2010). 2012: Science and Prophecy of the Ancient Maya. California: Tlacaelel Press. ISBN 978-0-9826826-0-9.
