= Robin Sears =

Robin V. Sears is a communications, marketing, and public affairs adviser. Sears joined the Earnscliffe Strategy Group in 2012 and was an NDP strategist for 20 years. He has worked in political campaigning, communications strategy, and public policy commentary.

== Career ==
Sears worked in political strategy and communications for the New Democratic Party of Canada, contributing to campaign and messaging strategy over multiple decades. His work has included roles in political consulting and public affairs advisory services.

Sears also served as a spokesperson for former Canadian Prime Minister Brian Mulroney. In 2008, he was reported to have registered as a lobbyist in connection with work involving Mulroney.

== Writing and commentary ==
In addition to political consulting, Sears has written commentary on Canadian politics, international relations, and public policy. His articles have appeared in publications including Policy Magazine, Policy Options, The Globe and Mailand rabble.ca.

His published work has addressed topics such as Canadian federal elections, political party organization, campaign finance regulation, and international relations, including Canada–China relations and geopolitical developments.

== Media appearances ==
Sears has contributed to Canadian broadcast and media discussions on politics and public policy. He has been interviewed on platforms including CBC Radio and covered in reports by CTV News.

== Selected writing ==
Sears has published opinion pieces and analysis on Canadian and international political issues, including articles catalogued on Muck Rack.
