= Greg Galant =

American programmer, founder, and entrepreneur

Gregory Galant
- Born: Huntington, New York, United States
- Employer(s): Muck Rack; Shorty Awards
- Honours: Dashboard 25; Innovator 25 Americas; Entrepreneur of the Year (Florida)

Greg Galant is an American programmer, founder, and entrepreneur. In 2008, he co-founded the Shorty Awards, and in 2009, he co-founded Muck Rack, a public relations management platform that indexes and fosters networking with journalists. He has been named as an influential entrepreneur by several organizations like PRWeek, PRovoke Media, and Entrepreneur of the Year.

== Early life ==
The son of two Newsday journalists, Galant was born in Huntington, New York. As a "bored teenager" in Long Island, he learned programming from a young age and helped create websites for local businesses like The Long Islander newspaper.

== Career ==
In 2005, Galant debuted Venture Voice, a podcast dedicated to sharing the experiences of entrepreneurs. Later, in 2008, Galant co-founded and became the executive producer of the Shorty Awards, an annual awards show acknowledging contributions to short-form content online.

In 2009, Galant and Lee Semel co-founded Muck Rack, a platform that was originally created in order to help journalists network during the emergence of social media by tracking tweets. Over time, Muck Rack grew to become an artificial intelligence-powered platform and database that provides tools, like monitoring and reporting, for the public relations industry to connect with journalists. The platform has also expanded its scope to encompass print content, podcasts, job updates, and newsletters. In 2022, Galant and Semel had their first Series A funding round for Muck Rack and raised $180 million from Susquehanna Growth Equity; previously, the company had been self-funded and profitable on its own. By then, Muck Rack indexed tens of thousands of journalists, and its database customers included International Rescue Committee, Google, Duolingo, Zapier, and others.

After the COVID-19 pandemic, Galant helped launch the Work Remotely Forever Pledge, an initiative advocating for remote work to be normalized. Galant is also the CEO of Sawhorse Media, the umbrella company which oversees Muck Rack and the Shorty Awards. Additionally, Galant frequently reports on the state of the public relations industry in the United States, as well as the ongoing debate over in-person versus remote work.

In 2011, Galant was named for PRWeek's Dashboard 25. In 2022, he was named in PRovoke Media's Innovator 25 Americas. In 2024, he was a Florida winner of the Entrepreneur of the Year program.
