= InterCultura =

InterCultura, Inc., was a not-for-profit private foundation, based in Fort Worth, Texas with offices in London, England, founded in 1982 by Gordon Dee Smith (president), J. Roderick Grierson (vice-president), Milbry Polk, and several other individuals for the purpose of furthering understanding among cultures by organizing and exchanging international art exhibitions. Over the course of the next 15 years, InterCultura organized and brought to the U.S. over a dozen important exhibitions from countries as diverse as Ethiopia, Japan, Mexico, Russia, and many other nations. Exhibitions of American art were sent abroad by InterCultura in exchange.

== Activities ==
InterCultura's practice was to bring together the leading scholars with great objects of art to produce exhibitions of outstanding scholarship. InterCultura's activities involved multi-project exchange programs supported by U.S. embassies in foreign countries to send U.S. art abroad in exchange for exhibitions from foreign national collections coming to the U.S.

== The Blood of Kings: A New Interpretation of Maya Art ==
The first major exhibition initiated by InterCultura was "The Blood of Kings: A New Interpretation of Maya Art," which opened at the Kimbell Art Museum in 1986. The Blood of Kings exemplified the InterCultura approach in that it was a presentation of ground-breaking scholarship, curated by two of the leaders of the group of scholars that had recently deciphered the Maya script: Linda Schele, of the University of Texas, and Mary Miller, of Yale University. The exhibition demonstrated, through a never-before-assembled collection of ancient Maya art borrowed from sources as diverse as the British Museum and the Government of Honduras, the imperative of an entirely new approach based on the decipherment of the Maya writing system. It revealed the Maya as real individuals - kings, queens, and royal dynasties as blood-thirsty and colorful as their Old World counterparts. The power of the exhibition was critical in the collapse of the old view of the Maya as peaceable mathematicians, and the emergence of the currently accepted picture of the Maya. The catalog remains a landmark addition to Maya scholarship and is widely cited.

== 10+10: Contemporary Soviet and American Painters ==
Starting in 1987, at the dawn of the glasnost era, InterCultura organized an exhibition titled "10 + 10: Contemporary Soviet and American Painters," the first exhibition of dissident or "non-official" art from the then-Soviet Union to be seen in US and Soviet museums. Following on this, in 1988 InterCultura negotiated the most extensive cultural exchange program ever signed between the then-Soviet Ministry of Culture and a private U.S. institution. Included was the most extensive exhibition presented in the US of the 19th century Russian group of painters called the Wanderers, titled "The Wanderers: Masters of 19th Century Russian Painting." The InterCultura US-Soviet exhibition exchange program survived the change from the Soviet Union to post-Soviet Russia, and the exchange concluded in 1993 with the most important exhibition of Medieval Russian art ever shown in the United States, a show of treasures from the Russian Museum in St. Petersburg titled "The Gates of Mystery,", which was also seen in the UK at the Victoria & Albert Museum.

== Other exhibitions ==
Other exhibitions organized by InterCultura included "The Art of Private Devotion: Mexican Retablo Painting," the first major exhibition of Ethiopian art borrowed from Ethiopian sources ever held in the U.S., titled "African Zion: Sacred Art of Ethiopia," the first major exhibition of the art of American painter Robert Motherwell shown in Mexico, titled "Robert Motherwell: An Open Door,", a major exhibition of Georgia O'Keeffe shown in Mexico and Japan, titled "Georgia O'Keeffe: American and Modern,", an exhibition of contemporary Japanese art, titled "Seven Artists: Aspects of Contemporary Japanese Art," and numerous additional shows on subjects ranging from modern Italian master drawings to Mexican dance masks.

== Museums with exhibitions ==
Museums at which InterCultura Exhibitions were shown include: Albright-Knox Art Gallery (Buffalo), Art Institute of Chicago, California Afro-American Museum (Los Angeles), Central Exhibition Hall (St. Petersburg, Russia), Cincinnati Art Museum, Corcoran Gallery of Art (Washington, D.C.), Dallas Museum of Art, Davenport Museum of Art, DuSable Museum of African American History (Chicago), Field Museum of Natural History, Fort Worth Museum of Science and History, Hayward Gallery (London), Henry Art Gallery (University of Washington), Kimbell Art Museum, Milwaukee Art Museum, Modern Art Museum of Fort Worth, Museum of African-American Life & Culture (Dallas), Palacio de Bellas Artes (Mexico City), Rufino Tamayo Museum (Mexico City), San Francisco Museum of Modern Art, Sarah Blaffer Gallery (Houston), Serpentine Gallery (London), State Picture Gallery of Georgia (Tbilisi), The Art Museum, Princeton University, The Schomburg Center for Research in Black African Culture (New York), The Walters Art Museum, Tretyakov Gallery (Moscow), Victoria and Albert Museum (London), Yokohama Art Museum (Japan), and others.

== Dissolution ==
Following the departure of its president Gordon Dee Smith and vice president Roderick Grierson, after a decade and a half of creating and touring exhibitions, InterCultura was dissolved in 1996.
