= Linda Schele =

American Mesoamericanist (1942–1998)

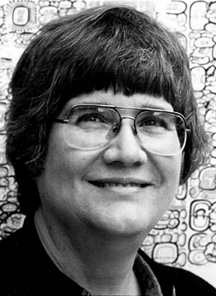
- Linda Schele in 1994
- Born: October 30, 1942
- Died: April 18, 1998 (aged 55)

Linda Schele (October 30, 1942 – April 18, 1998) was an American Mesoamerican archaeologist who was an expert in the field of Maya epigraphy and iconography. She played a central role in the decoding of much of the Maya script. She produced a massive volume of drawings of stelae and inscriptions, which, following her wishes, are free for use to scholars. In 1978, she founded the annual Maya Meetings at the University of Texas at Austin.

She was from Hendersonville, Tennessee, a northern suburb of Nashville. Her mother, Ruby Richmond, was active in historic preservation at Historic Rock Castle in the 1980s.

== Early life ==
Born in Nashville, Tennessee, Linda Schele began taking commercial art courses at the University of Cincinnati in 1960 and graduated in Education and Art in 1964. With an increasing interest in literature, she spent another four years in Cincinnati's graduate program and obtained her master's degree in Art in 1968. She married the architect David Schele in 1968, and started teaching Studio Art at the University of South Alabama, remaining there till 1980, by which time she was Professor.

== Work ==
In 1970 she traveled with her husband, David Schele, to photograph Mesoamerican monuments in Yucatán on behalf of the University. An obligatory visit to Palenque the next summer turned into a 12-day stay spent drawing and studying Maya architecture. Fascinated by the art, Schele decided to investigate the culture and history of the ancient people who had created the city.

Mentored by Merle Greene Robertson, Schele worked with Peter Mathews and Floyd Loundsbury to decipher a major section of the list of Palenque kings, presenting her work in the 1973 conference Mesa Redonda de Palenque, organized by Robertson. This meeting established the previously unknown Linda as a major figure in the Maya studies, not only of art and history, but also of dirt archaeology and epigraphy, and her work stimulated several later discoveries, by herself and others. In 1975, Schele was invited to the Second International Archaeoastronomy Conference at Colgate to present an exploratory paper on Palenque hierophanies and their link to emblem and skull variant glyphs, which she later published in 1977.

A strong supporter of collaborative scholarship, Schele became a Fellow in pre-Columbian Studies at Dumbarton Oaks in Washington, D.C., in 1975. Alongside Peter Mathews; David Kelley; and one of her longtime mentors, Floyd Lounsbury, she participated in a series of miniconferences at Dumbarton Oaks which pushed further developing and refining of the Palenque series and also opened new epigraphic frontiers. She focused on the study of word ordering in Maya inscriptions for the next two years there.

Still attending graduate school, Schele founded the Maya Hieroglyphic Workshop in Texas in 1977 which consisted of 21 consecutive seminars concerning Maya hieroglyphic writing and introduced more people intrigued by the Maya field than many other books from that time that were considered "popular". Twenty years later, the workshop expanded into what is known as the Maya Meetings at Texas, and includes a symposium of research papers by major scholars and the Forum on Hieroglyphic Writing.

By this time in her life, Schele realized her destiny as a Mayanist; she enrolled as a graduate student in Latin American Studies at the University of Texas shortly before resigning from her position at South Alabama. She was awarded a Doctorate in Latin American studies by the University of Texas in 1980. She continued her teaching career there, in the department of Art/Art History. At the time of her death, she was the John D. Murchison Regents Professor of Art in the department.

Schele joined the Copán Mosaics Project in the mid 1980s, working with David Stuart, Barbara Fash, and Nikolai Grube on the texts of that site. In 1986, Schele and Stuart identified Copan's dynastic founder, K’inich Yax K’uk’ Mo’. Shortly after, she began a related series called the Copán Notes, reports on epigraphy and iconography, which were aimed at rapid dissemination of information amongst Maya scholars.

In 1986, Schele co-curated a ground breaking exhibition and catalog of Maya art, "The Blood of Kings: A New Interpretation of Maya Art", with Mary Miller, a project initiated by InterCultura and the Kimbell Art Museum, where it opened in 1986, and the two co-authored the catalog to the exhibition, which was published under the title "The Blood of Kings: Dynasty and Ritual in Maya Art". The exhibition spoke of an obsession with royal descent, of incessant warfare, and of bloody sacrifice and self-mutilation which was inconsistent with the models proposed by previous generations of Mayanists. According to Michael D. Coe, the catalog presented by Schele and Miller "might as well stand as the most influential book on the Maya published in the past half-century."

She also began taking an interest in the culture of the contemporary Maya. For a decade beginning 1988, she organized 13 workshops, along with Nikolai Grube and Frederico Fahsen, on hieroglyphic writing for them in Guatemala and Mexico.

Michael D. Coe claims that "Linda's most important contribution to Maya scholarship" is represented in her book Maya Cosmos: Three Thousand Years on the Shaman's Path published in 1993 with David Freidel and Joy Parker.

== Death ==
On April 18, 1998, she died of pancreatic cancer, aged fifty-five. Upon being diagnosed with this disease, Schele planned ahead knowing she would not have long to live and resumed her lectures until a few days before her death. Just before her death, she established the Linda Schele Precolumbian Endowment, which provides financial support for the Linda and David Schele Chair in Mesoamerican Art and Writing at UT Austin.

== Recognition ==
Her doctoral dissertation, "Maya Glyphs: the Verbs" was published in 1982 and won "The Most Creative and Innovative Project in Professional and Scholarly Publication" an award given by the Professional and Scholarly Publishing Division of the Association of American Publishers. The Blood of Kings was awarded the Alfred H. Barr Jr. Award of the College Art Association for the best exhibition catalogue of 1986. She was awarded diplomas of recognition of the Museo Popol Vuh and the Universidad Francisco Marroquin by the government of Guatemala in March 1998.

== Texas Notes ==
The Texas Notes were informal reports produced by Linda Schele and others between 1990 and 1997 to allow for the quick dissemination of results in the rapidly evolving field of Maya epigraphy.

- Redating the Hauberg Stela, by Linda Schele, Peter Mathews, and Floyd Lounsbury (September 1990)
- The Palenque War Panel: Commentary on the Inscription, by Linda Schele (September 1990)
- A Proposed Decipherment for Portions of Resbalon Stair, by Linda Schele and Peter Mathews (September 1990)
- Untying the Headband, by Linda Schele, Peter Mathews, and Floyd Lounsbury (September 1990)
- Ba as "First" in Classic Period Titles, by Linda Schele (September 1990)
- The Nal Suffix at Palenque and Elsewhere, by Linda Schele, Peter Mathews, and Floyd Lounsbury (September 1990)
- A Proposed Reading for the "Penis-Perforation" Glyph by Federico Fahsen and Linda Schele (April 1991)
- Further Adventures with T128 ch'a by Linda Schele (April 1990)
- A Substitution Pattern in Curl-Snout's Name by Linda Schele and Federico Fahsen (September 1991)
- Curl-Snout Under Scrutiny, Again by Federico Fahsen and Linda Schele, (September 1991)
- Tzuk in the Classic Maya Inscriptions by Nikolai Grube and Linda Schele, (September 1991)
- New Readings of Glyphs for the Month Kumk'u and their Implications by Linda Schele, Peter Mathews, Nikolai Grube, Floyd Lounsbury, and David Kelley (September 1991)
- Some Observations on the War Expressions at Tikal by Linda Schele (September 1991)
- A Proposed Name for Rio Azul and a Glyph for "Water" by Linda Schele (September 1991)
- A War at Palenque During the Reign of Ah-K'an by Matthew G. Looper and Linda Schele (September 1991)
- Some New Ideas about the T713/757 "Accession" Phrases by Linda Schele and Khristaan D. Villela (December 1991)
- The Lunar Series in Classic Maya Inscriptions by Linda Schele, Nikolai Grube, and Federico Fahsen (October 1992)
- El Zapote and the Dynasty of Tikal by Linda Schele, Federico Fahsen, and Nikolai Grube (October 1992)
- Naranjo Altar 1 and Rituals of Death and Burials by Nikolai Grube and Linda Schele (November 1993)
- Un verbo nakwa para "batallar o conquistar" by Nikolai Grube and Linda Schele (November 1993)
- Pi as "Bundle" by Linda Schele and Nikolai Grube (December 1993)
- Creation and the Ritual of the Bakabs by Linda Schele (December 1993)
- The Helmet of the Chakte by Linda Schele and Khristaan Villela (March 1994)
- Tikal Altar 5 by Nikolai Grube and Linda Schele (March 1994)
- Some Revisions to Tikal's Dynasty of Kings by Linda Schele and Nikolai Grube (March 1994)
- The Last King of Seibal by Linda Schele and Paul Mathews (March 1994)
- An Alternative Reading for the Sky-Penis Title by Linda Schele (March 1994)
- Notes on the Chronology of Piedras Negras Stela 12 by Linda Schele and Nikolai Grube (August 1994)
- New Observations on the Oval Palace Tablet at Palenque by Linda Schele (October 1994)
- New Observations on the Loltun Relief by Nikolai Grube and Linda Schele (August 1994)

== Bibliography ==
- The Bodega of Palenque (Schele and Peter Mathews 1979)
- Sacred Site and World View at Palenque (Schele 1981) in Dumbarton Oaks Conference on Mesoamerican Sites and World Views
- Maya Glyphs: The Verbs (Schele 1982)
- The Mirror, the Rabbit, and the Bundle : Accession (Schele 1983)
- The Founders of Lineages at Copán and Other Maya Sites (Schele 1986) Copán Note VIII
- The Blood of Kings (Schele and Mary Ellen Miller 1986)
- A Forest of Kings (Schele and David Freidel 1990)
- Maya Cosmos (Freidel, Schele, and Parker 1993)
- Hidden Faces of the Maya (Schele and Jorge Perez de Lara 1997)
- The Code of Kings (Schele and Peter Mathews 1998)
