= Chakjobon =

Maya site in Campeche, Mexico with mural paintings containing early Maya script

- Type: Ancient Maya site
- Periods: Preclassic
- Cultures: Maya civilization
- Location: Mexico
- Region: Balam Kú Biosphere Reserve

Site notes
- Public access: Closed

Chakjobon is a Preclassic Maya archaeological site located in the Balam Kú Biosphere Reserve of southern Campeche in Mexico. The site is notable for the discovery of an elite burial chamber decorated with ancient murals paintings from the late Preclassic period considered as one of the oldest Maya murals in the region with one of the few earliest surviving examples of Preclassic Maya script.

== Archaeology ==
The site is located in the south of the Mexican state of Campeche within the Balam Kú Biosphere Reserve near Chan Laguna in a remote jungle area that is difficult to access and largely unexplored and so there is still very little knowledge about it being one of the least studied Maya regions, although it shows that it was densely populated during the preclassic period. The explored site consists of a platform with several structures and a 9 meters high pyramid with four burial chambers inside. Its original name is unknown; the name Chakjobon means "red painting" in Maya language in reference to the discovery of a group of preclassic mural paintings with monochrome red hieroglyphic inscriptions inside a structure at the site.

== Chakjobon murals ==
The mural paintings are located in the burial chamber of a royal tomb from the Preclassic period, a find that in itself has considerable archaeological relevance since elite Maya burials from this period are highly scarce even in regions where there is a high density of Preclassic settlements, this shows the existence of elite groups and early ruling dynasties north of Calakmul, which has changed part of the known history of the entire Maya lowlands. These murals share similarities in style, calligraphy, and iconographic elements with another of the few surviving examples from the late preclassic period, the murals of the San Bartolo site in Guatemala, dated to c. 100 BC, this makes the Chakjobon murals contemporary, or potentially even slightly older than the San Bartolo finds and demonstrates that during this formative stage there was already an advanced network of shared knowledge and a general consensus among the epigraphic elements used for writing by the first Maya scribes. The murals show on one side the figure of a ruler sitting cross-legged on a throne raising one of his hands in front of a long hieroglyphic inscription, originally more extensive but of which ten large glyphs are preserved in two columns of five rows, on the south wall there is a series of 12 glyphs in two columns of six rows, these are some of the oldest known Maya texts.

This early form of writing differs from the classic period Maya script in its grammatical structure and the absence of elements already deciphered, such as verbs, so its reading is not deciphered yet and is still the subject of archaeological study. The inscriptions on the murals possibly refer to the ruler buried in the tomb. The location of the paintings inside a sealed chamber and not in a public space also shows the antiquity of a funerary tradition of the Maya elite that lasted until the Late Classic period, in which mural paintings were integrated the mythological architecture where the deceased ruler was connected with the ancestors and deities and the inscriptions were used to communicated a message to them.
