= Nick Hopkins =

British investigative journalist and broadcaster

- Occupation(s): Investigative journalist and broadcaster
- Notable credit(s): The Guardian, Newsnight
- Awards: Pulitzer Prize

Nick Hopkins is a British investigative journalist and broadcaster, known for his work for The Guardian newspaper and the BBC's Newsnight television programme.

== Career ==
=== Investigative work ===
Nick Hopkins was a member of the investigative team at The Guardian responsible for publishing the Edward Snowden leaks in 2013, work that was awarded with the Pulitzer Prize. In 2014, he was, in a move publicized by the BBC, recruited to work with the Newsnight programme, referring to his career-spanning admiration of the show as a motivator behind the switch.

In January 2016, Hopkins returned to The Guardian as head of investigations. Shortly thereafter, the newspaper disbanded the incumbent investigative team, asking members to seek other positions within the organization. As of January 2018, Hopkins retains his role as head of investigations at The Guardian.

=== Earlier career ===
In the announcement of his recruitment by the BBC in 2014, Hopkins stated he had worked in journalism for more than two decades. He describes his career as having started at the Surrey Comet and later, the Wolverhampton Express & Star.

In 1994, Hopkins joined the Daily Mail, ultimately serving as the nationwide paper's New York Correspondent. His first, 16-year stint at The Guardian began in 1998 and lasted until 2014, and included roles as a national and foreign news editor, four years as Crime Correspondent and three years as Defence and Security Editor.

In a verified profile on the journalist profiling site Muck Rack, Hopkins also lists journalistic work experience with Yahoo, The Irish Times, AlterNet, CIO Today, Teton Valley News and Der Freitag.
