= Santa Elena Poco Uinic =

- Poco Uinic
- Location within Mesoamerica
- 16°35′14.9172″N 91°44′20.4756″W
- Periods: Late Classic
- Cultures: Maya civilization
- Location: Chiapas, Mexico
- Region: Chiapas

Santa Elena Poco Uinic (also known as just Poco Uinic) is a Classic Maya site in Chiapas, Mexico. It contains Stela 3, that has the date 9.17.19.13.16 5 K'ib' 14 Ch'en and a glyph that indicates an eclipse. An eclipse was recorded as occurring on July 16, 790 CE O.S., so this find has frequently been proposed as a way to establish a correlation between the Maya Calendar and the Julian Calendar.
