= John Montgomery (art historian) =

American art historian, illustrator, and author (1951–2005)

John Montgomery (1951–2005) was an American art historian, illustrator, and author specialising in Pre-Columbian art.
