= El Caracol, Chichen Itza =

Structure at Chichen Itza in Mexico

Coordinates: 20.6792°N 88.5707°W

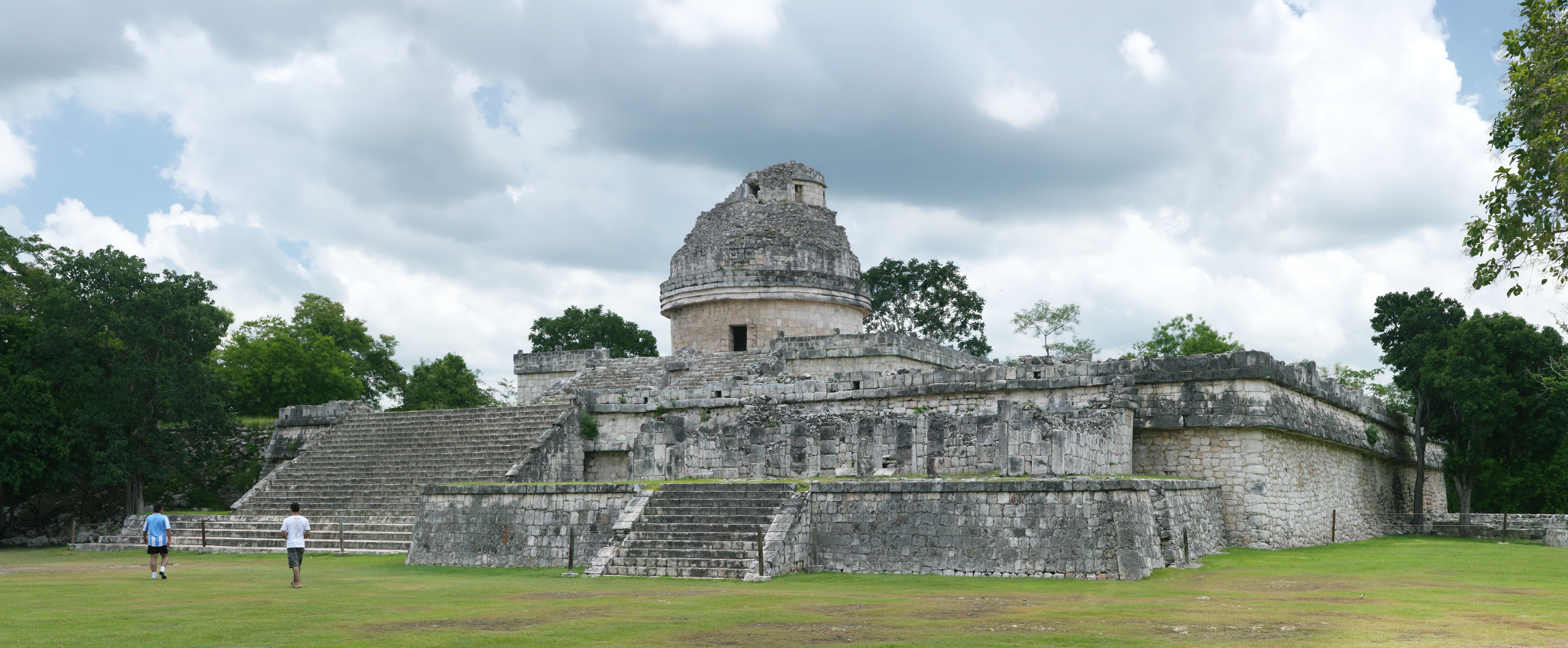
El Caracol

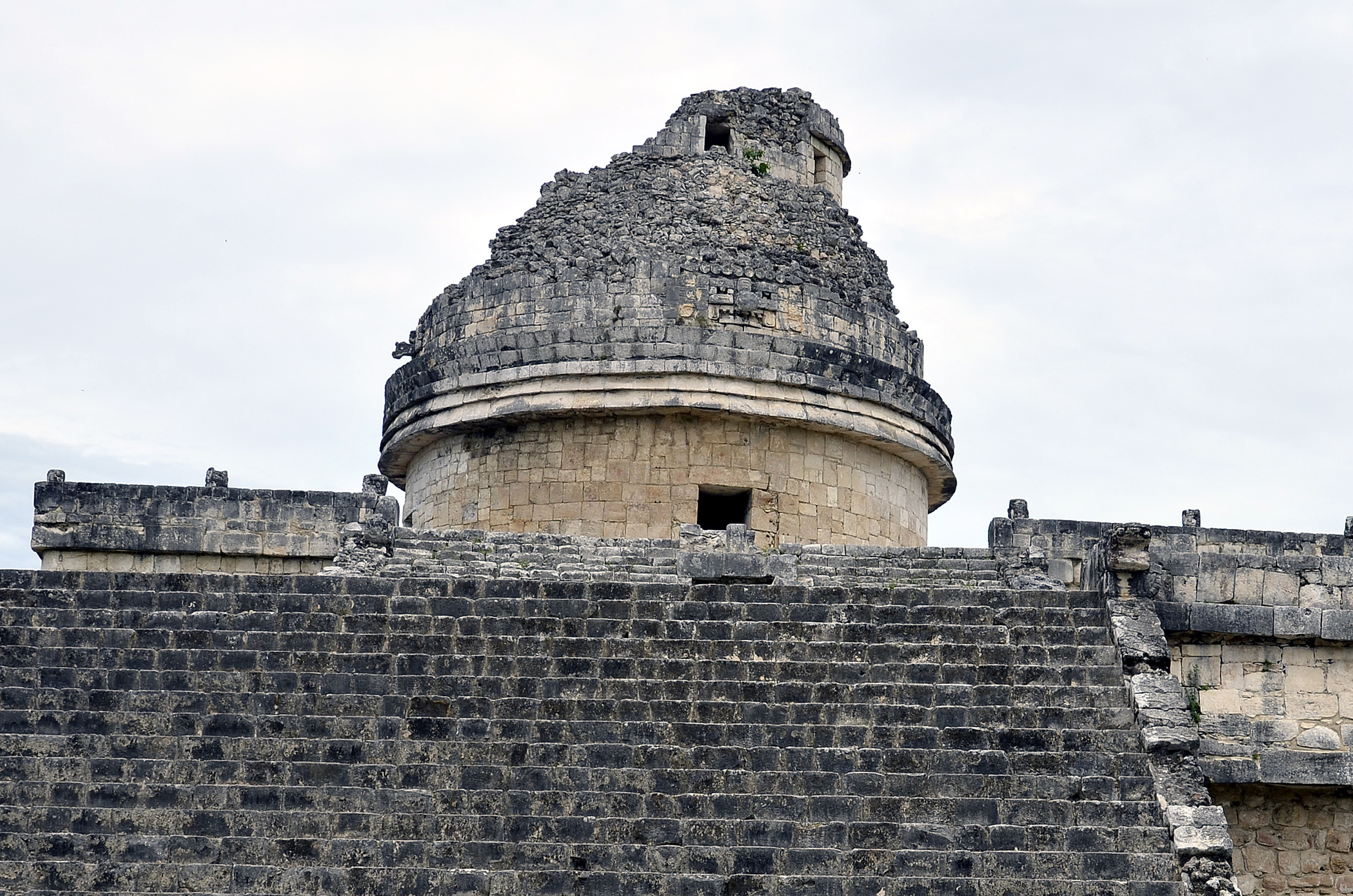
Upper part of the tower

El Caracol, the Observatory, is a unique structure at pre-Columbian Maya civilization site of Chichen Itza. El Caracol, which means 'snail' in Spanish, is so named due to the spiral staircase inside the tower.

== History ==
The structure is dated to around AD 906, the Post Classic period of Mesoamerican chronology, by the stele on the Upper Platform.

It is suggested that El Caracol was an ancient Mayan observatory building and provided a way for the Mayan people to observe changes in the sky due to the flattened landscape of the Yucatán with no natural markers for this function around Chichen Itza. The observers could view the sky above the vegetation on the Yucatán Peninsula without any obstruction.

== Observations ==
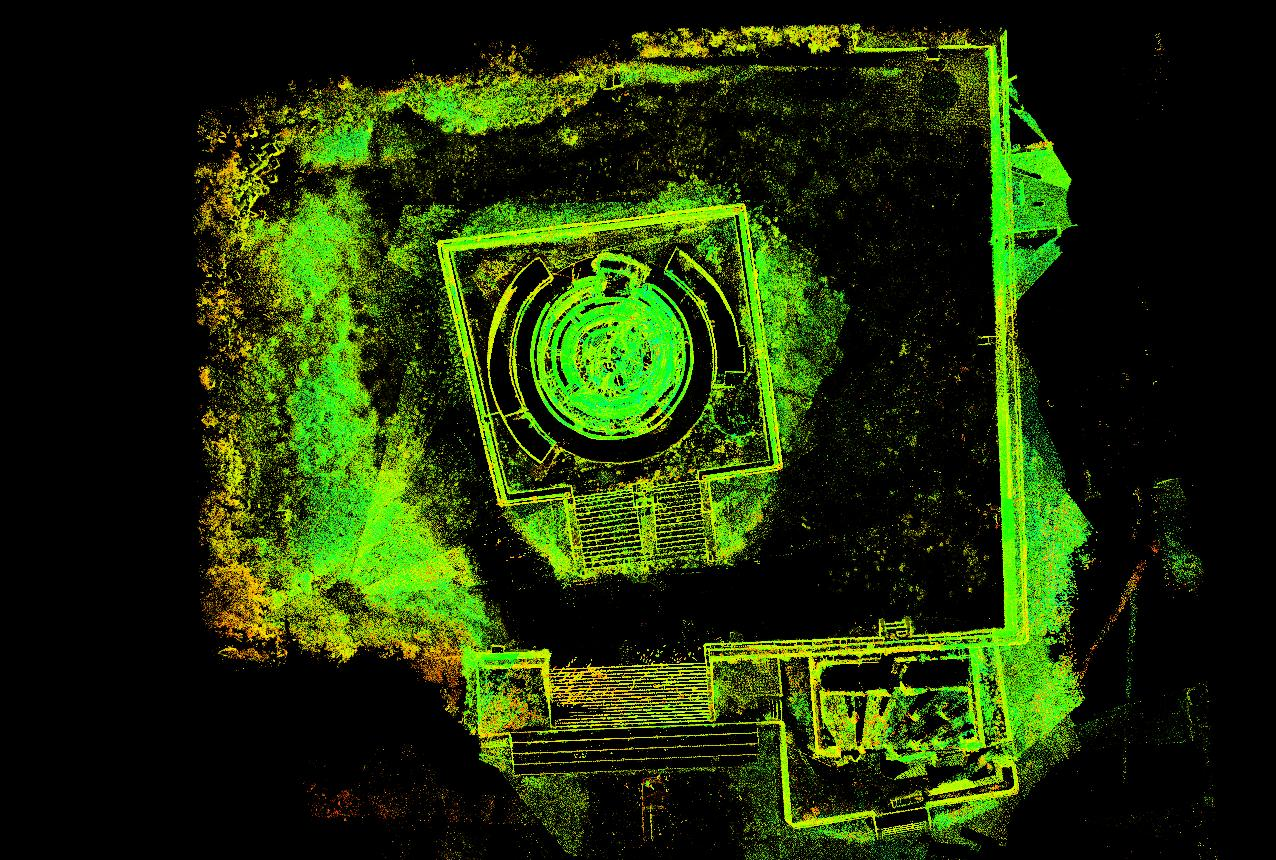
Laser scan of El Caracol

Mayan astronomers knew from naked-eye observations that Venus appeared on the western and disappeared on the eastern horizons at different times in the year, and that it took about 584 days to complete one cycle.

They also knew that five of these Venus cycles equaled eight solar years. Venus would therefore make an appearance at the northerly and southerly extremes at eight-year intervals.

Of 29 possible astronomical events (eclipses, equinoxes, solstices, etc.) believed to be of interest to the Mesoamerican residents of Chichén Itzá, sight lines for 20 can be found in the structure. Since a portion of the tower resting on El Caracol has been lost, it is possible that other observations will never be ascertained.

== Bibliography ==
- Aveni, Anthony F. (2001). Skywatchers (Rev. and updated edn. of: Skywatchers of ancient Mexico, 1980 ed.). Austin: University of Texas Press. ISBN 0-292-70504-2. OCLC 45195586.
