= Peter Mathews (archaeologist) =

Australian anthropologist and archaeologist

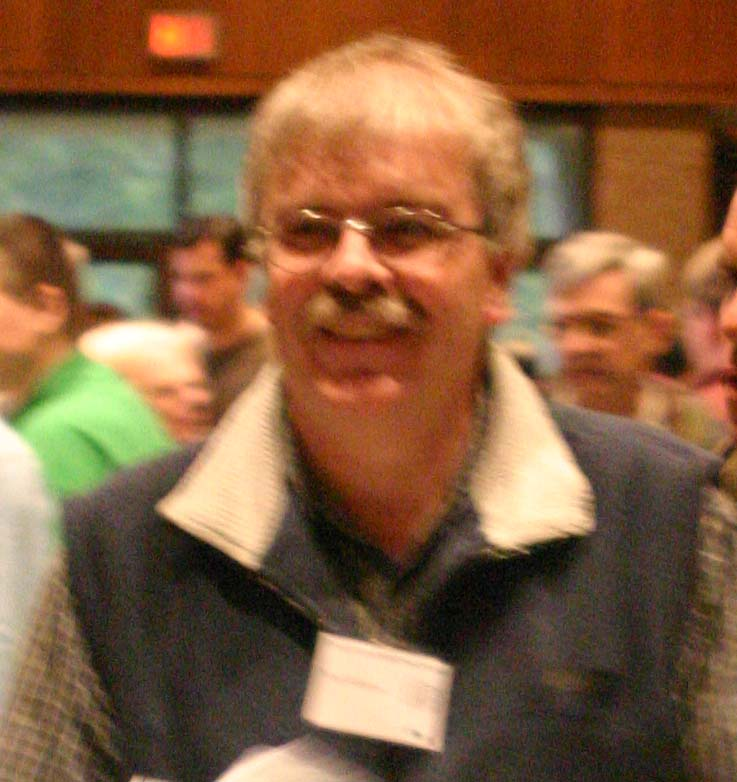
- Born: June 12, 1951 (age 74); Canberra, Australia
- Occupations: Archaeologist, Epigrapher, Mayanist

Peter Mathews (born 12 June 1951 in Canberra, Australia) is an Australian archaeologist, epigrapher, and Mayanist.

He was a professor at the University of Calgary, and is Co Director of the Naachtun Archaeology Project. Between 1979 and 1986 he taught in the Department of Anthropology at Harvard University. He was a professor of Archaeology and Maya Hieroglyphs at La Trobe University until his retirement at the end of 2011. He continued to lecture at the university throughout 2012, until his end of tenure in 2013.

He graduated with a B.A. in 1975 from the University of Calgary where he studied with David H. Kelley, and Yale University with a MPhil, and PhD, where he studied with Michael D. Coe. During his time at Yale he was a MacArthur Fellow, at the age of 33.

In the 1960s, he dubbed artifacts to be from an unknown "Site Q", which some think is La Corona. In 1973, he was invited to the first Mesa Redonda, Palenque conference.

In 1997, he and ten Mexican colleagues were attacked, held, and released, near the Maya site of El Cayo.

== Awards ==
- 1984 MacArthur Fellows Program
- 2002 Fellow of the Academy of the Humanities in Australia

== Works ==
- Mathews, Peter (n.d.). "Site Names and Codes". Who's Who in the Classic Maya World. Foundation for the Advancement of Mesoamerican Studies, Inc.
- Mathews, Peter (1991). "Classic Maya emblem glyphs". In T. Patrick Culvert (ed.). Classic Maya Political History: Hieroglyphic and Archaeological Evidence. School of American Research Advanced Seminars. Cambridge and New York: Cambridge University Press. pp. 19–29. ISBN 0-521-39210-1.
- Schele, Linda; Peter Mathews (1998). The Code of Kings: The Language of Seven Sacred Maya Temples and Tombs. New York: Scribner. ISBN 0-684-80106-X. OCLC 37819972.
- Mathews, Peter; Gordon R. Willey (1991). "Prehistoric polities of the Pasion region: hieroglyphic texts and their archaeological settings". In T. Patrick Culbert (ed.). Classic Maya Political History: Hieroglyphic and Archaeological Evidence. School of American Research advanced seminar series. Cambridge: Cambridge University Press. pp. 30–71. ISBN 0-521-39210-1. OCLC 20931118.
- Mathews, Peter (2005). ""Casper II": Complete List of Text References". Who's Who in the Classic Maya World. Foundation for the Advancement of Mesoamerican Studies, Inc. (FAMSI).
- "MAYA HIEROGLYPH DICTIONARY", FAMSI
- Foster, Lynn V., Mathews, Peter, Handbook to life in the ancient Maya world, Oxford University Press US, 2005, ISBN 9780195183634
