= El Cayo (Maya site) =

Maya site in Chiapas, Mexico

- Yax Akul Ha’ Yax Nil
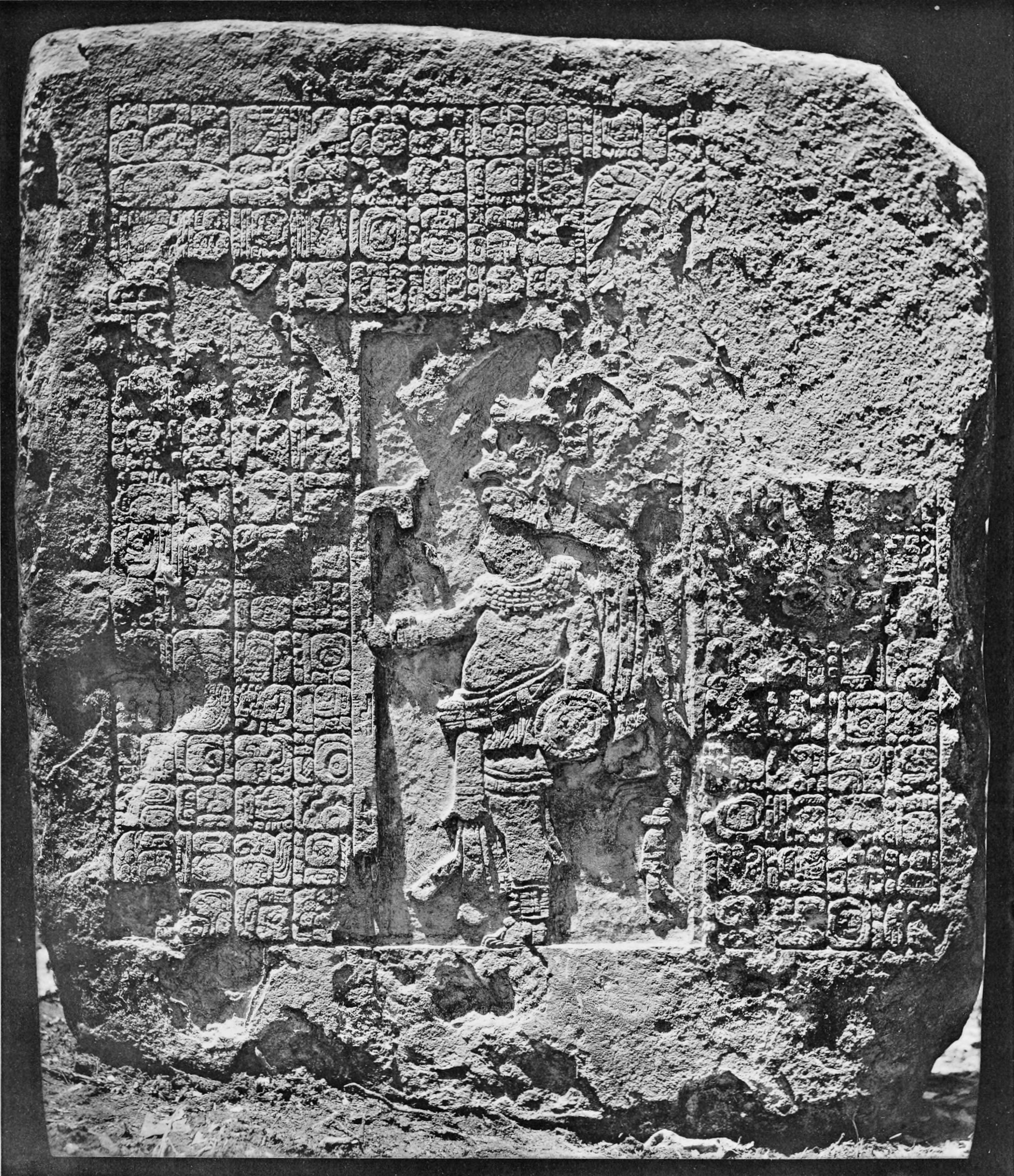
- El Cayo lintel 1
- Interactive map of El Cayo
- Type: Ancient Maya site
- Periods: Late Preclassic - Classic
- Cultures: Maya civilization
- Location: Mexico
- Region: Usumacinta River

Site notes
- Discovered: 1897

El Cayo, anciently known as Yax Niil or more extendedly Yax Akul Ha’ Yax Nil, is an archaeological Maya site located in the bank of the Usumacinta River in the state of Chiapas, Mexico. El Cayo was a major Maya city from the Usumacinta region subordinated for a period to Piedras Negras. Numerous stelae and monuments with glyphic inscriptions have been found in the site, the monuments narrate the complex context and political organization that the site lived during the Classic period in the region of the Usumacinta River Basin, most of the site remains unexplored and hidden in the jungle.

== History ==
El Cayo settlement started during the late Preclassic period and it developed until the late Classic period of Mesoamerica, its location on the bank of the Usumacinta River gave the city an strategic geopolitical position in the region. The rulers of El Cayo had a hierarchy under the rank of Sajal, a title given to a nobleman subordinated to the ruler of a bigger capital, in this case, El Cayo was a vassal of Piedras Negras.

El Cayo Altar 4 has a Mesoamerican long count inscription of 9.11.12.1.3 13 Ak'bal 11 Yax, which is equivalent to September 1, 664 AD and is indicated as the birth date of a sajal from El Cayo named Aj Chak Wayab' K'utim. The Altar illustrates the image of Aj Chak Wayab' K'utim sitting in front of a censer performing an end-of-cycle ceremony on the long count date of 9.15.0.0.0 4 Ajaw 13 Yax, which corresponds to August 18, 731 AD.

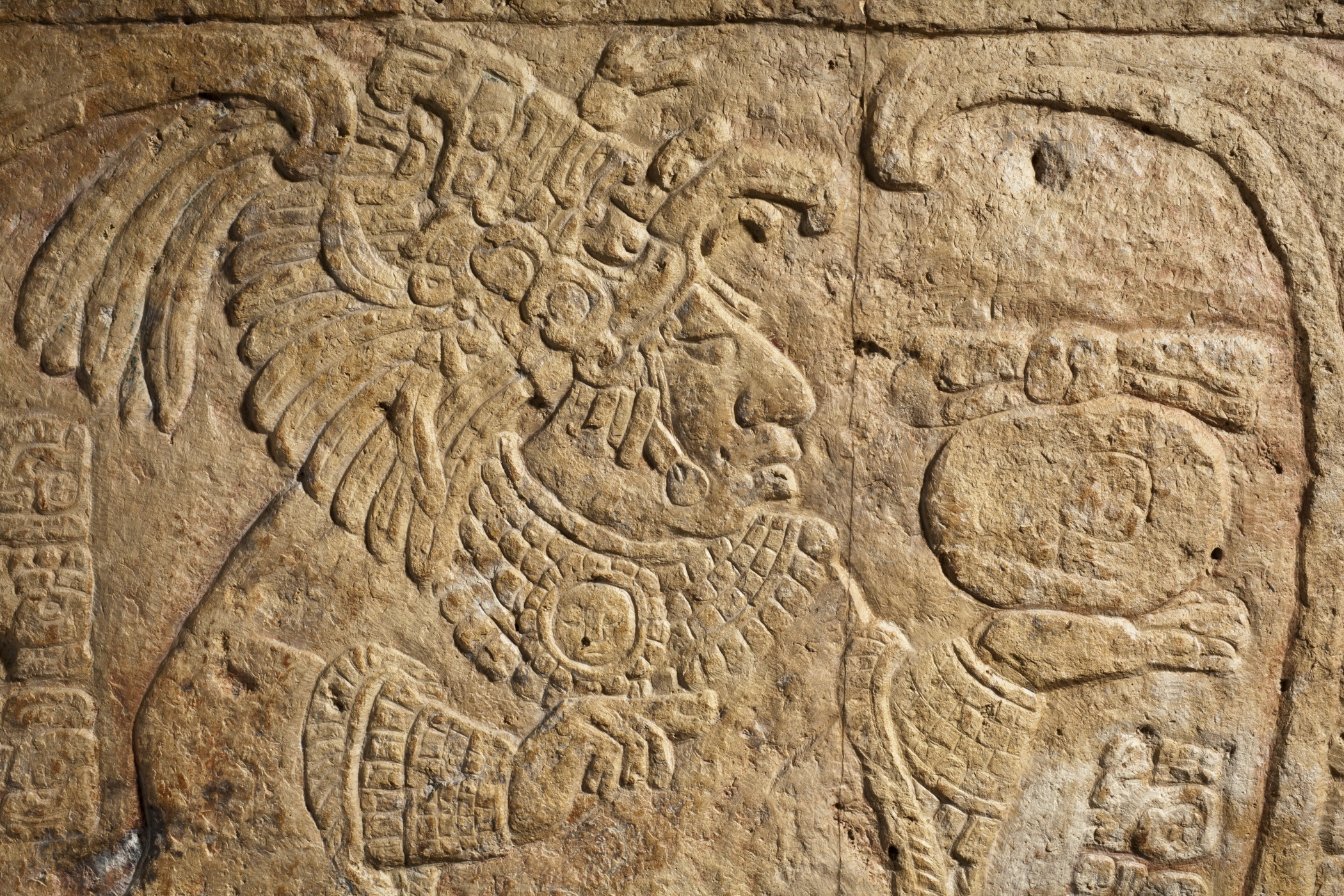
Lintel from El Cayo

El Cayo lintel 1 records some political topics related to the site, first it records the birth date of a nobleman named Chan Panak’ Wayib’ recorded in the Mesoamerican long count of 9.16.0.2.16 6 Kib’ 9 Mol corresponding to June 30, 751 AD. Then it narrates that on April 18, 763, a ruler of Piedras Negras participated in the ceremony of ascension to power of Chan Panak' Wayib for his future succession to the title of sajal. After this, it is recorded that years later Aj Sak Maax, a ruler of Sak Tz'i, encommended another sajal named Aj Chak Suutz' K'utiim, this would imply that at some point Piedras Negras had lost its power and domain over El Cayo and it was already under the domain of Sak Tz'i.

The site was discovered and first documented in 1897 by Teobert Maler during an expedition on the Usumacinta region where he recorded the presence of several monuments and a ruined main palace. In 1997, a group of archaeologists including Peter Mathews, tried to extract Altar 4 to take it to a museum but they were attacked and kidnapped by local indigenous people accusing them of being looters, after some days they were found in the middle of the jungle, this incident ended every archaeological research and cancelled any further investigations in the site until today.

== Rulers of El Cayo ==
- Aj Chak Wayab' K'utim
- Chan Panak' Wayib
- Aj Chak Suutz' K'utiim
