= Muck Rack =

American public relations software company

Muck Rack is an American software company that began as a company that provided information on journalists and their work. Founded in 2009 by Greg Galant and Lee Semel, it developed over more than a decade to become a service provider for a public relations management platform.

In September 2022, Muck Rack announced a $180 million Series A investment led by Susquehanna Growth Equity, one of the largest investments in the PR technology sector.

As of 2025, Muck Rack was providing tools for generative engine optimization (GEO), to support business strategic aims to shape how popularly used large language models interpret and present business information.
