= Lost literary work =

Work without known surviving copies

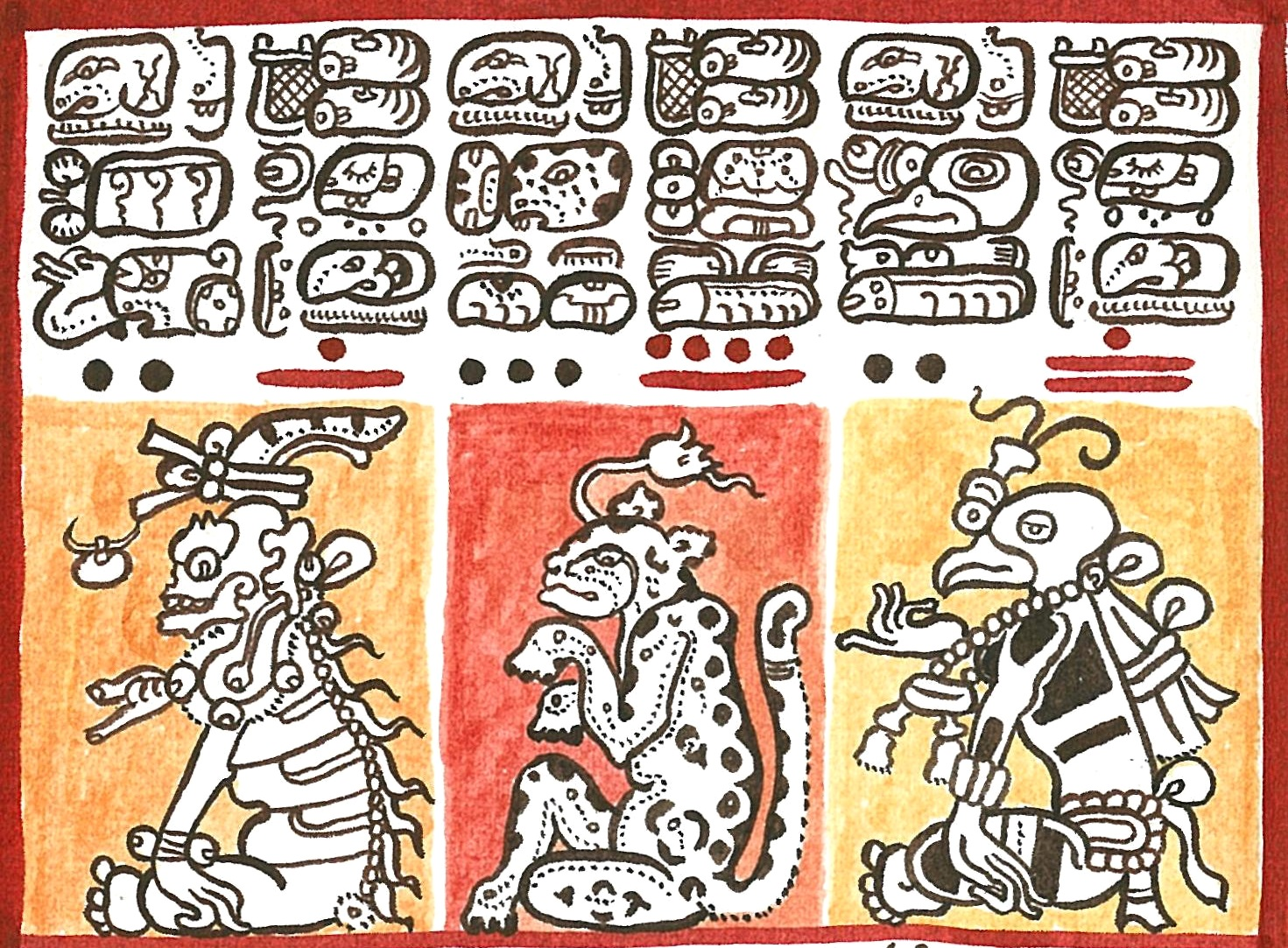
Only four Mayan books have survived from the Precolumbian era (Dresden codex page pictured)

A lost literary work (referred throughout this article just as a lost work) is a document, literary work, or piece of multimedia, produced of which no surviving copies are known to exist, meaning it can be known only through reference, or literary fragments. This term most commonly applies to works from the classical world, although it is increasingly used in relation to modern works. A work may be lost to history through the destruction of an original manuscript and all later copies.

Works—‌or, commonly, small fragments of works—‌have survived by being found by archaeologists during investigations, or accidentally by laypersons such as, for example, the finding Nag Hammadi library scrolls. Works also survived when they were reused as bookbinding materials, quoted or included in other works, or as palimpsests, where an original document is imperfectly erased so the substrate on which it was written can be reused. The discovery, in 1822, of Cicero's De re publica was one of the first major recoveries of a lost ancient text from a palimpsest. Another famous example is the discovery of the Archimedes Palimpsest, which was used to make a prayer book almost 300 years after the original work was written. A work may be recovered in a library, as a lost or mislabeled codex, or as a part of another book or codex.

Well known but not recovered works are described by compilations that did survive, such as the Naturalis Historia of Pliny the Elder or the De architectura of Vitruvius. Sometimes authors will destroy their own works. On other occasions, authors instruct others to destroy their work after their deaths. Such instructions are not always followed: Virgil's Aeneid was saved by Augustus, and Kafka's novels by Max Brod. Handwritten copies of manuscripts existed in limited numbers before the era of printing. The destruction of ancient libraries, whether by intent, chance or neglect, resulted in the loss of numerous works. Works to which no subsequent reference is preserved remain unknown.

Deliberate destruction of works may be termed literary crime or literary vandalism (see book burning).

Through statistical analysis, it is estimated that the number of lost incunable (works printed in Europe before 1501) editions is at least 20,000.

== See also ==
- Art theft
- Bonfire of the vanities
- Electronic literature – software obsolence
- Iconoclasm
- Link rot
- Literary fragment
- Lost film
- Lost media
- Lost television broadcast
- Unfinished creative work
