= Maya Codex of Mexico =

Pre-Columbian Maya book

Maya Codex of México
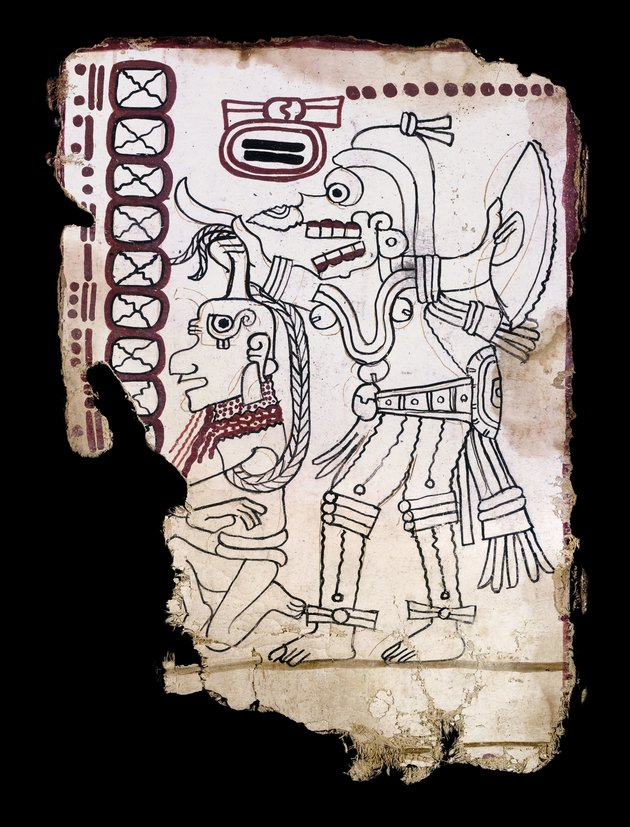
- Page 6 of the Maya Codex of Mexico, depicting a death god with captive
- Also known as: Grolier Codex
- Date: 1021–1154 CE
- Place of origin: Chiapas, Mexico
- Material: Amate
- Format: Screenfold book
- Script: Maya script

The Maya Codex of Mexico (MCM) is a Maya screenfold codex manuscript of a pre-Columbian type. Long known as the Grolier Codex or Sáenz Codex, in 2018 it was officially renamed the Códice Maya de México (CMM) by the National Institute of Anthropology and History of Mexico. It is one of only four known extant Maya codices, and the only one that still resides in the Americas.

The MCM first appeared in a private collection in the 1960s and was shown at "The Maya Scribe and His World", an exhibition held at the Grolier Club in New York City in 1971, hence its original name. An almanac that charts the movements of the planet Venus, it originally consisted of twenty pages; the first eight and the last two are now missing. Folio 8 has the tallest fragment, measuring 19 centimeters (7.5 in), and its pages are typically 12.5 centimeters (4.9 in) wide. The red frame lines at the bottom of pages four through eight indicates that the dimensions were once substantially taller, and that the scribe prepared a space for text under the figure on each page. Accordingly, the manuscript would once have measured 250 centimeters (98.4 in), roughly the size of the Dresden Codex.

Its authenticity was disputed at the time of its discovery, but has been upheld by multiple studies. In 2018, a team of scientists coordinated by the National Institute for Anthropology and History demonstrated conclusively that the document dates to the period between 1021 and 1154 CE. The Mexican studies confirm that it is the oldest surviving codex from Mexico and the oldest book of the Americas.

== Modern history and authenticity ==
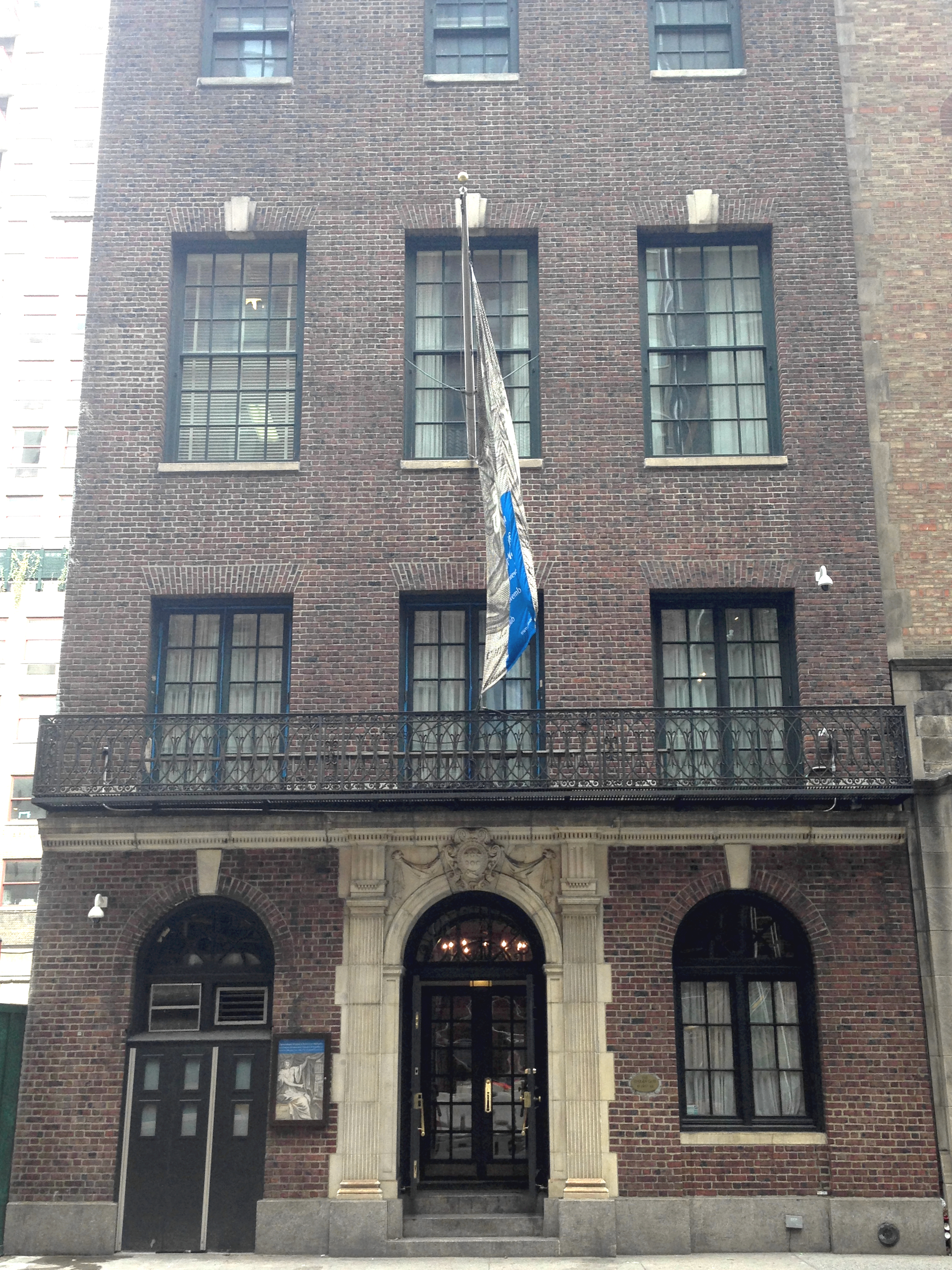
The Codex was first displayed at the Grolier Club in New York, hence its name

The first Mexican owner, Josué Saenz, claimed that the manuscript had been recovered from a cave in the Mexican state of Chiapas in the 1960s, along with a mosaic mask, a wooden box, a knife handle, as well as a child's sandal and a piece of rope, along with some blank pages of amate (pre-Columbian fig-bark paper). Saenz lent the manuscript to the Grolier Club and later presented the book to the Mexican nation.

The codex is said to have been found enclosed in a wooden box in a dry cave in the highlands of Chiapas near Tortuguero; it was said to have been found with a turquoise mask that is now in the collection of Dumbarton Oaks. In 1965, the Mexican collector Dr. Josué Sáenz was taken by two men on a light plane to a remote airstrip in the foothills of the Sierra Madre near Tortuguero in Tabasco state; the compass of the plane was covered with a cloth but Sáenz recognized his approximate location. At the airstrip he was shown the codex along with some other looted Maya artifacts and was told that he could take the items back to Mexico City for authentication before purchasing them. The antiquities expert that Sáenz consulted declared that the artifacts were fakes but Sáenz later purchased the codex and permitted Michael Coe to display the codex at the Grolier Club in 1971. In 1976, the United States-Mexico Artifacts Treaty of 1970 was invoked by the Attorney General of Mexico. This resulted in the seizure of the codex and its return to Mexico. Sáenz donated the codex to the Mexican government and it is currently kept in the vault of the National Library, after being kept for years in a vault in the Museo Nacional de Antropología in Mexico City and not on public display. The claimed discovery of the Grolier Codex would make it the only pre-Columbian codex discovered in the course of the 20th century, except for some codex fragments excavated by archaeologists.

Following the 1971 exhibition, Michael D. Coe, published the first half-size recto-side facsimile of the codex in The Maya Scribe and His World, published by the Grolier Club in 1973. The MCM was subsequently published various times, by detractors (J. Eric S. Thompson, Milbrath, Baudez, among them) and by proponents (Stuart, Carlson). Coe, Stephen D. Houston, Mary Miller, and Karl Taube published the first full-sized facsimile in 2015, using photographs taken by National Geographic photographer Enrico Ferorrelli in 1987, along with a full set of hand-drawn and uncopyrighted drawings for dissemination, and a thorough analysis of the context, content, and iconography of the codex. Coe et al. also demonstrated that the paper is three-ply, which lent itself to the screen-fold format. A new facsimile, based on new photography, was published by the Mexican government in 2018.

The English Mayanist J. Eric S. Thompson cast doubt upon the authenticity of the MCM in 1975, although he did not see the manuscript himself. As Victoria Bricker and Harvey Bricker have argued, the contents of the MCM have not been copied directly from any known codices, and yet they are consistent with an authentic and accurate prehispanic calendar. Although other scholars have argued for and against the codex, the arguments against the manuscript's authenticity became irrelevant in the face of Mexican scientific analysis.

Various campaigns of scientific testing of the manuscript have taken place, beginning with a radiocarbon test in 1972 which yielded a date of 1035–1431; a subsequent test in 2012 produced a date of 1050–1284. In 2007, the Instituto de Física de la Universidad Nacional Autónoma de México subjected the codex to non-destructive testing in an effort to determine its authenticity, and identified the key ingredient of Maya blue, palygorskite. Tests under the sponsorship of INAH yielded additional radiocarbon dates, leading to a consensus that the manuscript dates to the 11th or 12th century. Additional scientific study has demonstrated that the amate paper surface was prepared on both sides with a thin foundation of gypsum, or calcium sulfate (CaSO_{4}•2H_{2}O) measuring between 0.2 mm-0.3 mm, in order to form a smooth writing surface. The Mexican studies have also proven that the pigment is contemporaneous with the paper; further work has shown that the pigments include lamp black, red produced from hematite (Fe_{2}O_{3}), Maya blue fashioned from indigo dye and palygorskite, and browns prepared with cochineal.

Mexican scientific study has also shown that the codex was subjected to at least three periods of high moisture conditions. Furthermore, tiny arthropods took up residence in the MCM at some point, yielding crisply chewed edges that detractors of the manuscript misconstrued as scissor cuts. Looters handled the codex roughly, tearing apart the pages. Today only pages four, five, and six remain attached to one another.

In 2015, ahead of the INAH study, Coe, Houston, Miller and Taube published a full study of the codex. They presented further arguments in support of the authenticity of the document and came to the conclusion that only a Maya priest could have made the work. A critical review of the arguments in favor of authenticity was published by archaeologist, Brian Love, in the August 2017 edition of the journal, Mexicon. Nevertheless, teams of scientists under the auspices of Mexico's National Institute of Anthropology and History declared the MCM to be authentic in 2018.

== Content ==
Although both front and back (recto and verso) of the MCM were prepared for painting, only one side was completed as a ritual manuscript. Each recto page features a standing deity facing left. The left-hand side of each page is marked by a column of repeated day signs; where this column is complete these total thirteen in all. Ring numbers across the upper margin link the days of the Venus cycle, recorded in a hybrid system that incorporates both the bar-and-dot numeration of the Maya and the single dots used in Central Mexico and Oaxaca.

Mesoamerican peoples paid close attention to Venus, understood to be a dangerous and warlike entity (XRF Mesoamerican calendars). Venus's cycle was broken down by synodic periods as follows: 90 days of invisibility in superior conjunction (SC), 250 days of visibility as Evening Star, 8 days of invisibility in inferior conjunction (IC), and 236 days of visibility as Morning Star, for a total of 584 days. Five Venus cycles equals 8 solar years of 365 days, providing for numerological opportunities.

It is these synodic periods that are spelled out in the MCM ring numbers. For example, page 7 shows a bar and three dots inside the “ring,” so that the reader counts forward 8 days from the Lamat day (e.g.10 Lamat, in the second position) to the Kib day (e.g. 5 Kib, in the second position), 8 days later on page 8. On page 8, the count in the “ring” is 16, three bars and one dot; this is added to the sum yielded by the 11 dots, which note periods of 20, or 220 days, to total 236 days: 236 is the period of Venus's visibility as Morning Star. The book would have served as a guide to precise knowledge in the hands of a Maya priest in the late 11th or early 12th century.

The first eight pages of the codex are now lost, as are the last two, but the page numbering today refers to the pages now in existence. Page 1 depicts K’awiil, who takes a captive. Page 2 depicts a death god, the god most commonly known as Kimi among the Maya. The deity of Page 3 is not easily identifiable, but the blackened eyes of the captive are like those seen on Dresden 60b. K’awiil repeats on Page 4, this time taking a captive. Page 5 features a version of a solar deity known from Dresden 55a, and as the face of an Early Postclassic Maya mask at the Art Institute of Chicago (1965.782); this sun god sets the temple in front of him afire with a dart launched from his atlatl. A death god appears on page 6, almost certainly a version of Tlahuizcalpantecuhtli, as first identified by John Carlson. He wields a massive knife and has decapitated another deity that he holds by the hair. The death deity has a jagged flint blade in his nasal cavity, similar to a depiction at the Temple of the Warriors, Chichen Itza.

The enigmatic deity of Page 7 stands in front of a shining tree, or what David Stuart first called the "Shiner". His headdress is very close to the headdresses worn by the five deities in the Vaticanus B Venus passages, and this may further link him to Tlalhuizcalpantecuhtli, god of the Morning Star in Central Mexico. The shining tree may be issuing radiant jade disks. Page 8 has been identified as a bird deity, with some serpent qualities; he wears a thick belt and tezcacuitlapilli over a hide skirt, and he has shot the temple in front of him with a dart from his atlatl.

Although sometimes identified as a maize deity, the Page 9 god is the craggy mountain deity or personified mountain from which a maize kernel or a maize god could emerge, like the representation discovered at Tancah in 1974. In the MCM the mountain deity prepares to hurl a stone and takes a captive. Finally, although once thought to be fragments of two different pages, Page 10 can now be recognized as a single page, and the depiction of the third and final skeletal death deity, probably Tlalhuizcalpantecuhtli again. The deity has launched an atlatl dart into a body of water to strike a gastropod, very much like images from the Nuttall and Borgia codices (Codex Nuttall 16, 34, 75, 80; Codex Borgia 12, 53).

Two more pages would have followed these ten, to complete the full Venus cycle recorded in the surviving pages.

== Style ==
The radiocarbon date of the codex places it squarely in the Early Postclassic period, when both Tula and Chichen Itza were waning in power and when all of Mesoamerica was in decline. The workmanship of the MCM relates to late paintings at Chichen Itza, in which outlines and underdrawing are only loosely followed by the subsequent final painting. The discovery of ring numbers in the Xultun paintings, dating to 800 CE, provided evidence that ring numbers were in use for centuries, and not unique to the Dresden Codex. The proportions of the human figures are similar to those known from Terminal Classic and Early Postclassic fine orange ceramics, typically with a ringstand support.

Saeko Yanigasawa has demonstrated that the style of the MCM most closely relates to that of Mixtec codices, which may have drawn on hybrid works like the MCM, and other scholars have noted that headdresses known from the Mixtec manuscripts are first known in the MCM. The rounded eye, as opposed to the oval characterized by a straight line across the upper side of the eye, is known at Chichen Itza. Also typical of both the MCM and paintings at Chichen Itza is the casual attention to underdrawing; in both, the final painted line deviates from the sketch. The style of the MCM hieroglyphs is simple but competent, consistent and controlled for long columns of day signs. Both the underdrawing and the finished work suggests that a single scribe, using at least two brushes, one brush for thicker, viscous pigments used for the day signs, and a finer instrument to handle the human figures and other elements of each scene.

== Exhibition ==
The MCM was first shown at the Grolier Club from April 20 to June 5, 1971. Prior to the first exhibit in 1971 at The Grolier Club, the MCM was in the possession of a private collector in Mexico. The MCM first appeared at an auction in the late 1960s. The MCM was exhibited at the Museo Nacional de Antropología of Mexico City for three weeks in September and October 2018.

== Gallery ==
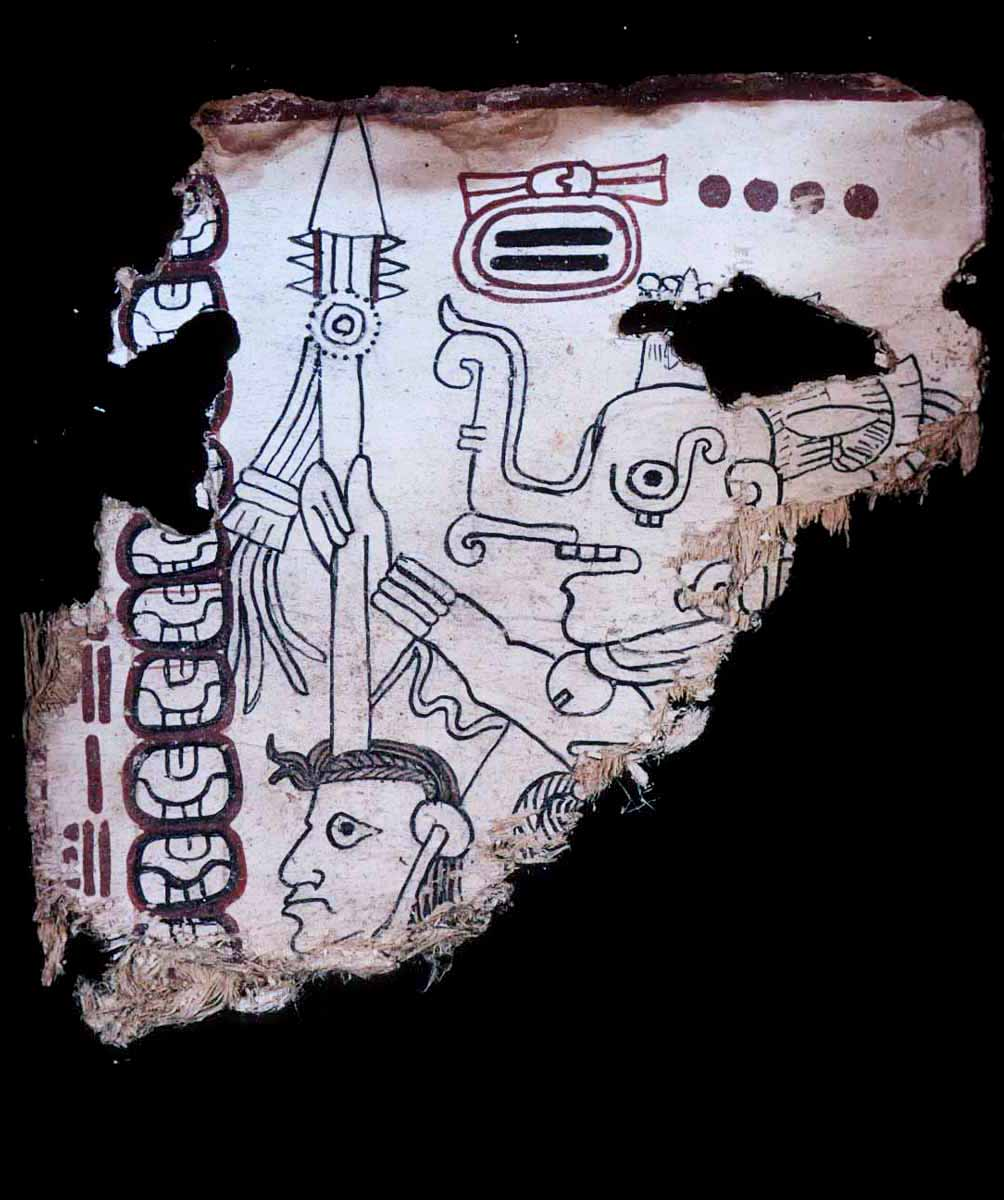
Page 1

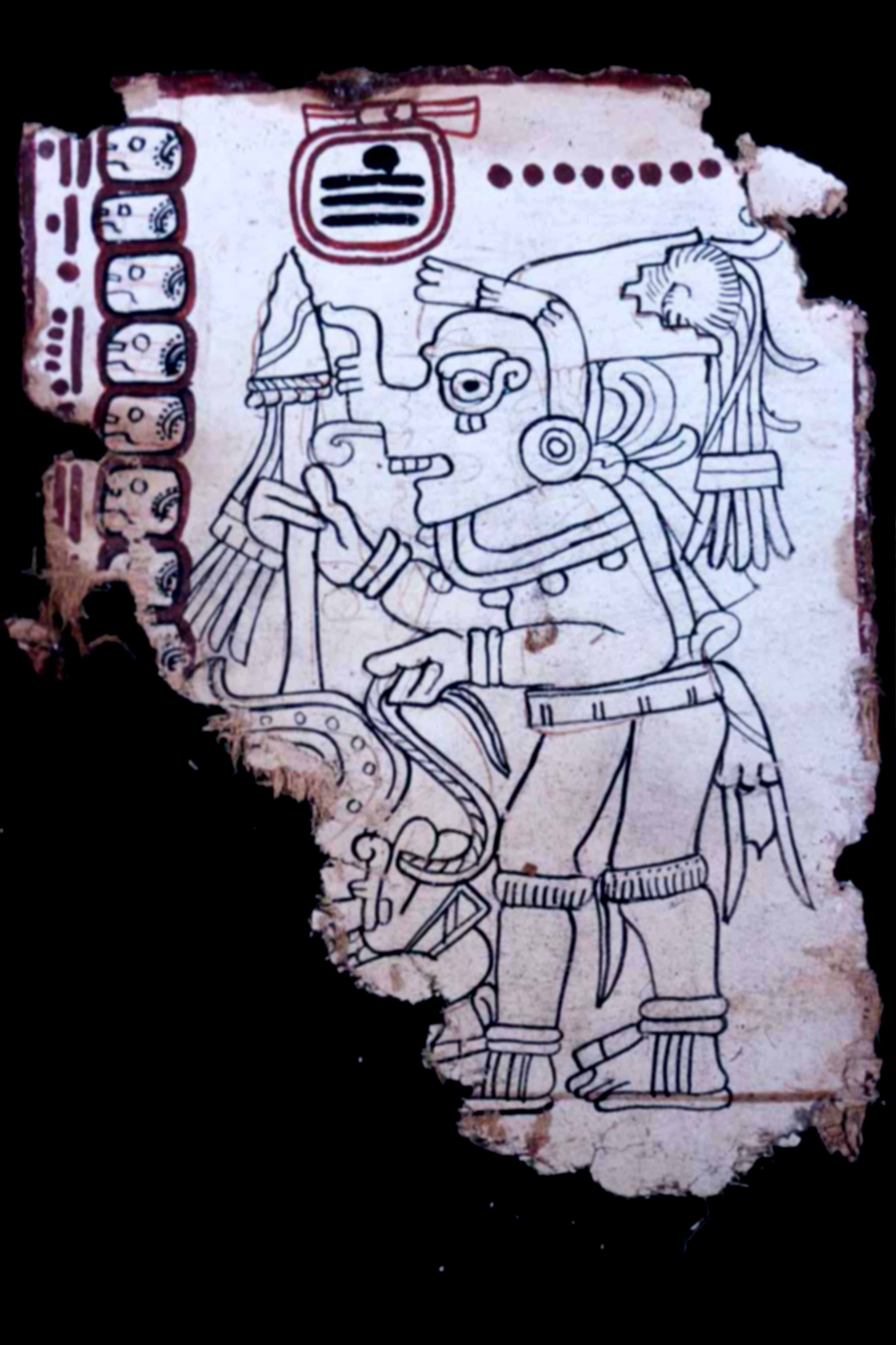
Page 4

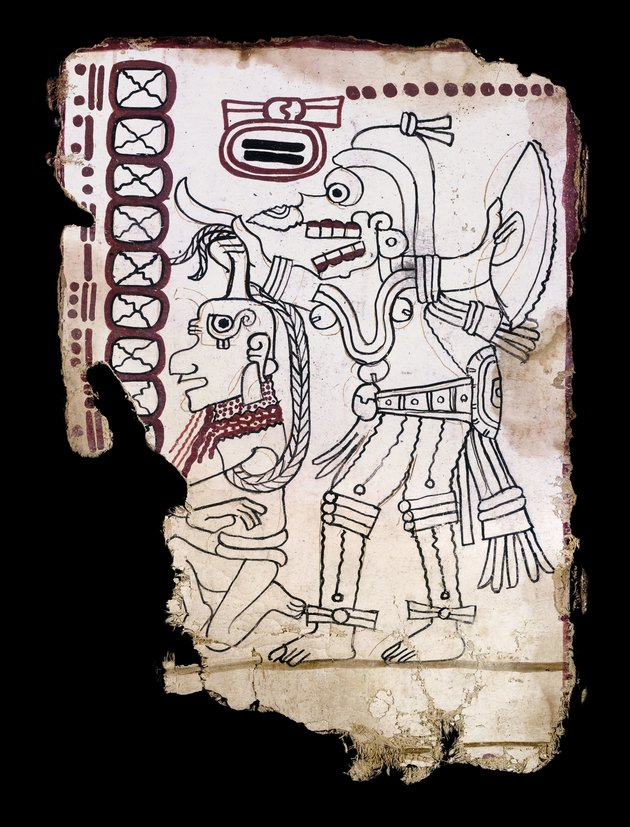
Page 6

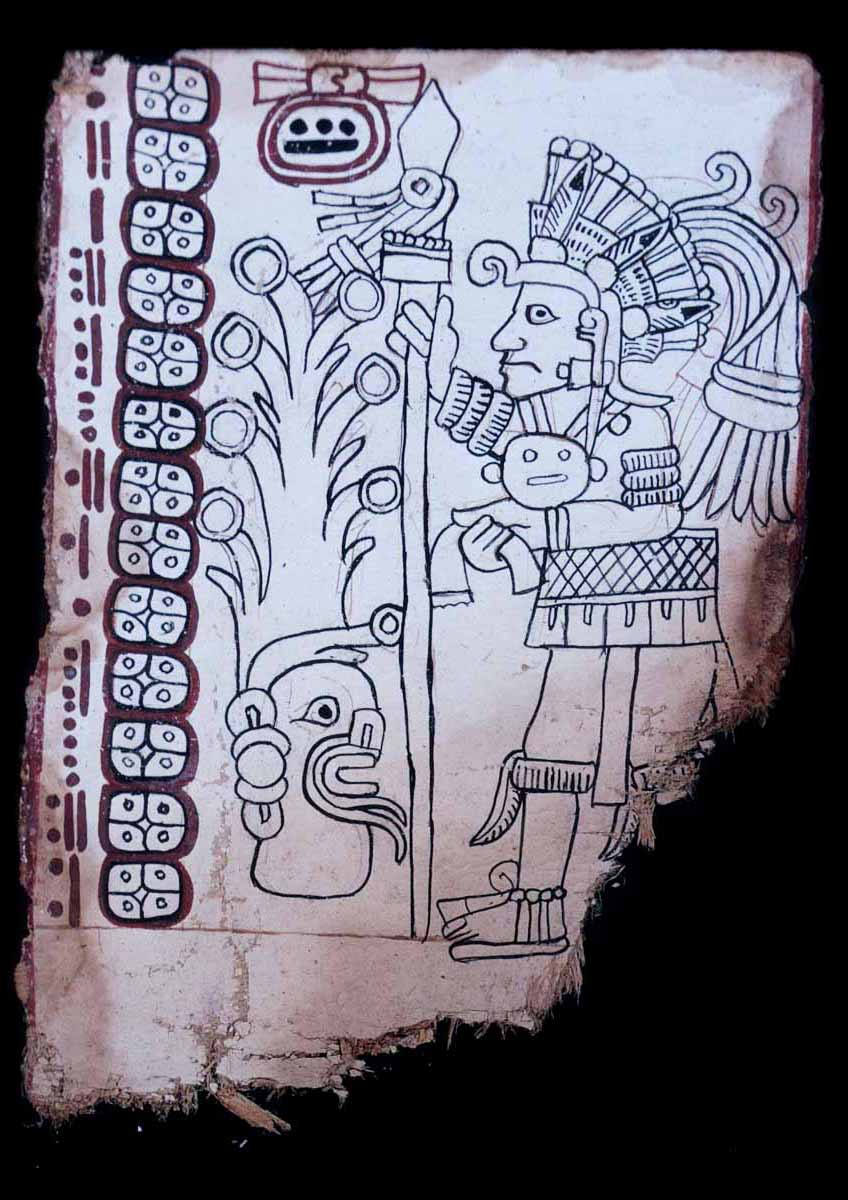
Page 7

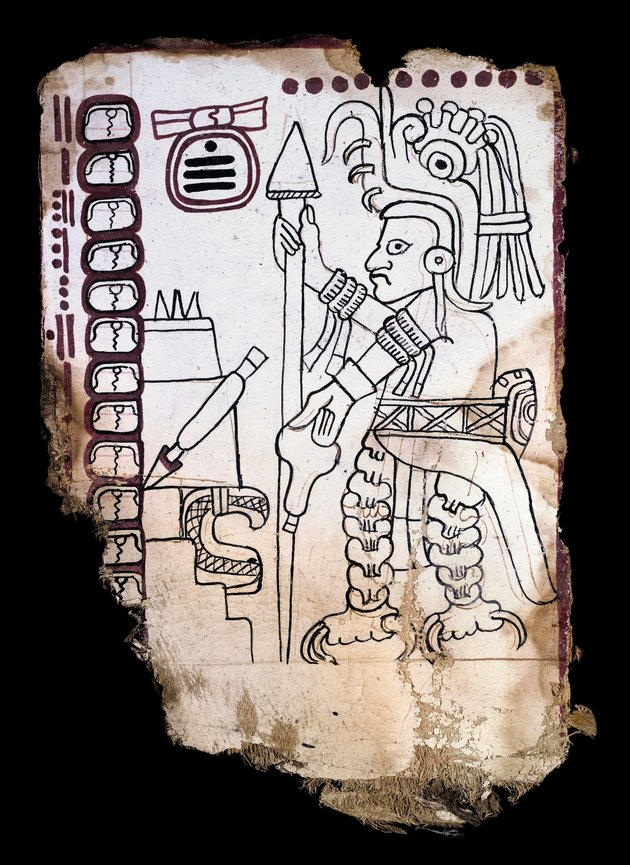
Page 8

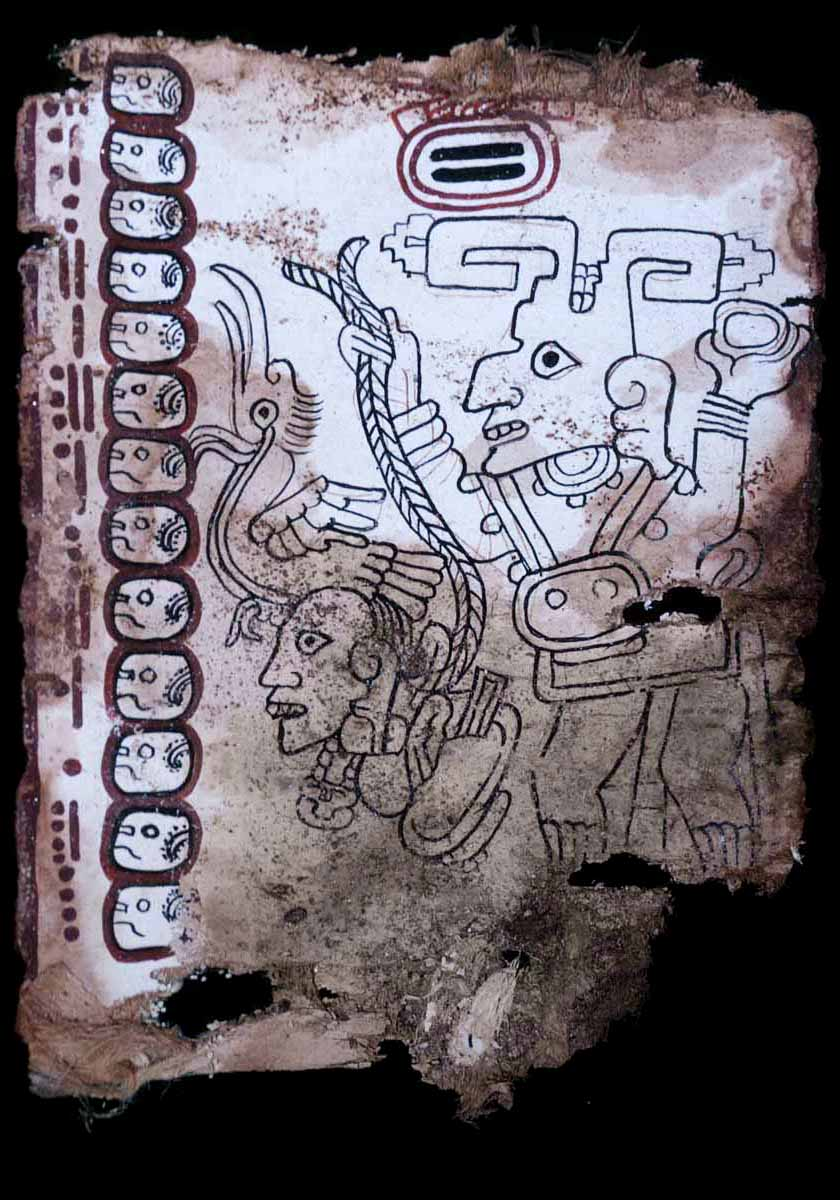
Page 9

== See also ==
- Maya codices
