= Mary Miller (art historian) =

American art historian and Dean of Yale College (born 1952)

- Born: 30 December 1952 (age 73)
- Occupations: Art historian, Academician
- Known for: Specializing in Mesoamerica and the Maya
- Awards: Guggenheim Fellowship, Member of the American Academy of Arts and Sciences

Academic background
- Education: Princeton University (BA); Yale University (PhD)

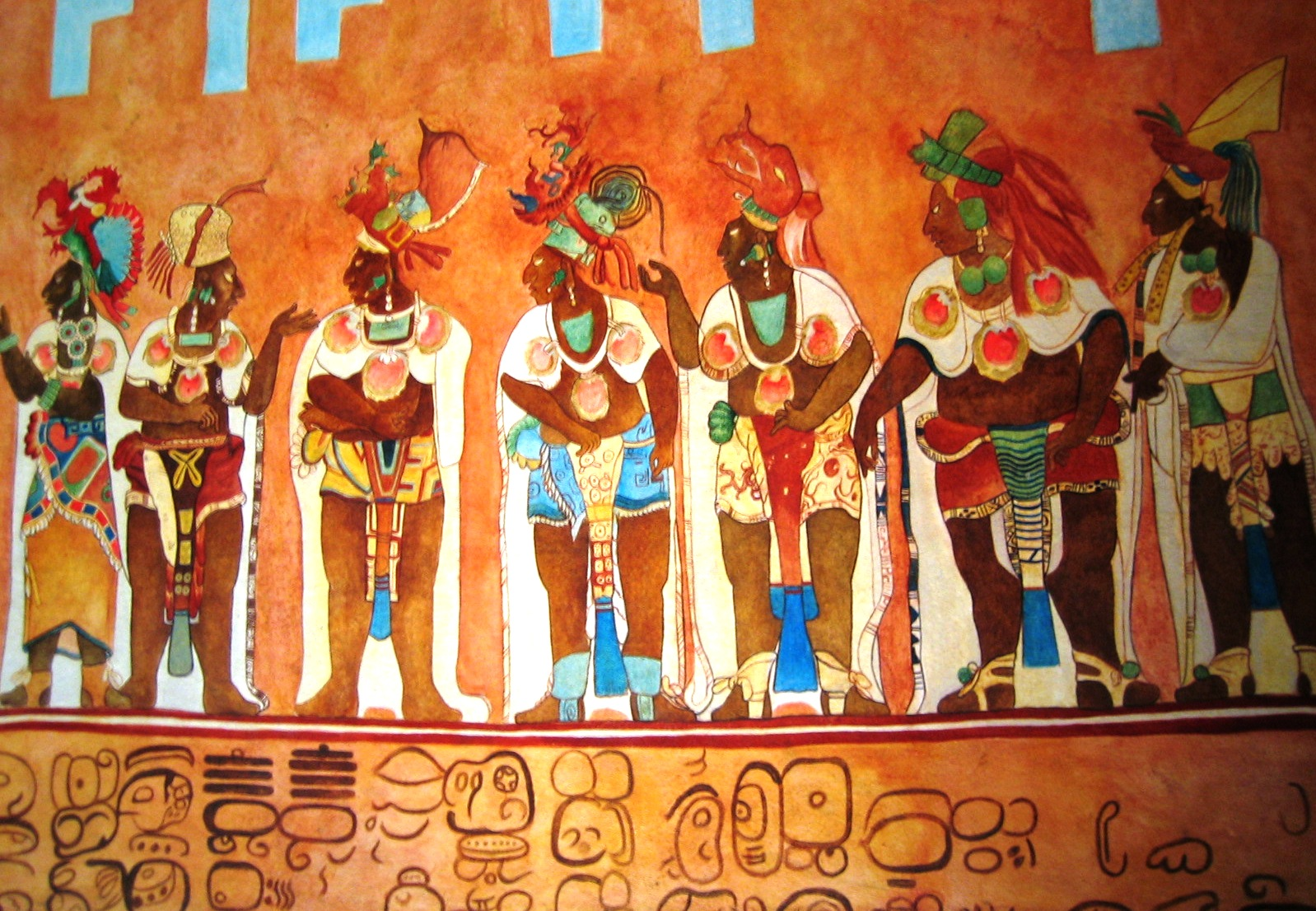
Example reproduction of a section of the Bonampak Murals as commissioned by Professor Mary Miller and completed by artists Heather Hurst and Leonard Ashby of the Bonampak Documentation Project. The infrared images captured by this project revealed portions of the murals that were not visible to the naked eye due to erosion or otherwise destroyed by previously botched restoration attempts. In this way, Hurst and Ashby were able to create very detailed reproductions.

Mary Ellen Miller (born December 30, 1952) is an American art historian and academician specializing in Mesoamerica and the Maya.

== Academic career ==
A native of New York, Miller earned her AB degree from Princeton University and her PhD from Yale University in 1981 with a thesis titled The Murals of Bonampak, Chiapas Mexico. Miller joined the Yale faculty in 1981, and in 1998 was appointed as the Vincent Scully, Jr. Professor of the History of Art.

Miller served as the master of Saybrook College from 1999 until the autumn of 2008, when she was both appointed as Sterling Professor and named the replacement of Peter Salovey as Dean of Yale College. She was the first woman to hold Yale College's highest office, and served as dean from December 2008 to June 2014. When Yale University President, Richard Levin, announced Miller's appointment as dean, he had nothing but praise for her: "Mary is the embodiment of what you look for in a Yale College dean," Levin said in an interview after the official appointment ceremony held in Luce Hall. "She is a magnificent scholar, a devoted teacher and a terrific master." Miller cited a desire to return to academia as her reason for stepping down from the deanship position in 2014.

She has also served as the chair of the history of art, Latin American studies, and archaeological studies departments at Yale, as well as director of undergraduate studies of the history of art. Until December 2018, she was the senior director for the Institute for the Preservation of Cultural Heritage Art of the Ancient New World at Yale. In January 2019, she became the director of the Getty Research Institute in Los Angeles.

== Exhibition projects ==
Miller served as the guest curator for "The Courtly Art of the Ancient Maya", a highly acclaimed exhibition of Maya art that took place in 2004 at the National Gallery of Art, Washington, D.C., and the Fine Arts Museums of San Francisco. For that exhibition, she wrote the catalogue of the same title—a finalist for the Alfred H. Barr Jr. Award of the College Art Association—with Simon Martin, senior epigrapher at the University Museum, University of Pennsylvania. A previous exhibition catalogue, The Blood of Kings, co-authored with Linda Schele, received the CAA's Barr Award in 1986.

== Other projects and publications ==
Miller has worked, together with Beatriz de la Fuente, Stephen Houston, Karl Taube and artists Heather Hurst and Leonard Ashby, for many years on her archaeological project to document and reconstruct the Maya wall paintings at Bonampak, Mexico, which resulted in two standard works, namely The Murals of Bonampak in 1986 and, together with Claudia Brittenham, The Spectacle of the Late Maya Court; Reflections on the Murals of Bonampak in 2013. Miller is also the author of several overviews written for a general public, specifically Maya Art and Architecture, The Art of Mesoamerica and, along with the aforementioned Karl Taube, The Gods and Symbols of Ancient Mexico and the Maya: An Illustrated Dictionary of Mesoamerican Religion. Her many articles address questions of Aztec and Maya art, as well as the historiography of Precolumbian art. A few additional works include:

- co-edited with Barbara Mundy, Painting a Map of Mexico City (Yale: 2012)
- The Art of Mesoamerica: From Olmec to Aztec, (London: Thames and Hudson, 1986; 5th ed, 2012); Spanish edition 2007.
- co-edited with Khristaan Villela, The Aztec Calendar Stone (Getty Sourcebooks: 2010).
- ed. Jeffrey Quilter and Mary Miller A Precolumbian World (Dumbarton Oaks, Washington, D.C., 2006).
- with Simon Martin Courtly Art of the Ancient Maya (London: Thames and Hudson 2004).
- with Linda Schele, The Blood of Kings: Ritual and Dynasty in Maya Art, (New York: George Braziller, and Fort Worth: Kimbell Art Museum, 1986).
- Jaina Figurines: A Study of Maya Iconography, Exhibition Catalogue (3 May – 29 June), (Princeton, NJ: Princeton University Art Museum, 1975).
- The Maya Collapsed—Could We?(CNN: 2012, December 7).
- Miller, M. (2013). Yale University Presidential Inaugural Symposia: The Splendid Maya Murals of Bonampak, Mexico: The Spectacle of the Late Maya Court [Public Lecture]. USA: Yale University.
- Miller, M. (1998). A Design for Meaning in Maya Architecture. In S. Houston (Ed.), Function and Meaning in Classic Maya Architecture (pp. 187–222). Washington, D.C.: Dumbarton Oaks Research Library and Collection.

In 2017, Prof. Miller spoke in support of the authenticity of the Grolier Codex, the most recently discovered Maya codex. According to Miller, some of the seeming errors in the manuscript can be explained because, in the context of its time, this manuscript was "only a modest, workaday object likely created by a provincial artist".

== Recognition ==
Miller has won national recognition for her work on the Maya, including a Guggenheim Fellowship. She is also a member of the American Academy of Arts and Sciences. In April and May 2010, she delivered the 59th A. W. Mellon lectures at the National Gallery of Art. During the 2015–2016 term, Miller was the Paul Mellon Senior Fellow at the National Gallery of Art's Center for Advanced Study in the Visual Arts. During her tenure as Dean of Yale College, Miller successfully secured a $1.8 million award from the Mellon Foundation for an "integrated Humanities Program" for Yale doctoral students in May 2012. Additionally, she delivered the Slade Lectures at Cambridge University during the academic year 2014–2015.
