= Paris Codex =

Maya manuscript

- Bibliothèque Nationale de France
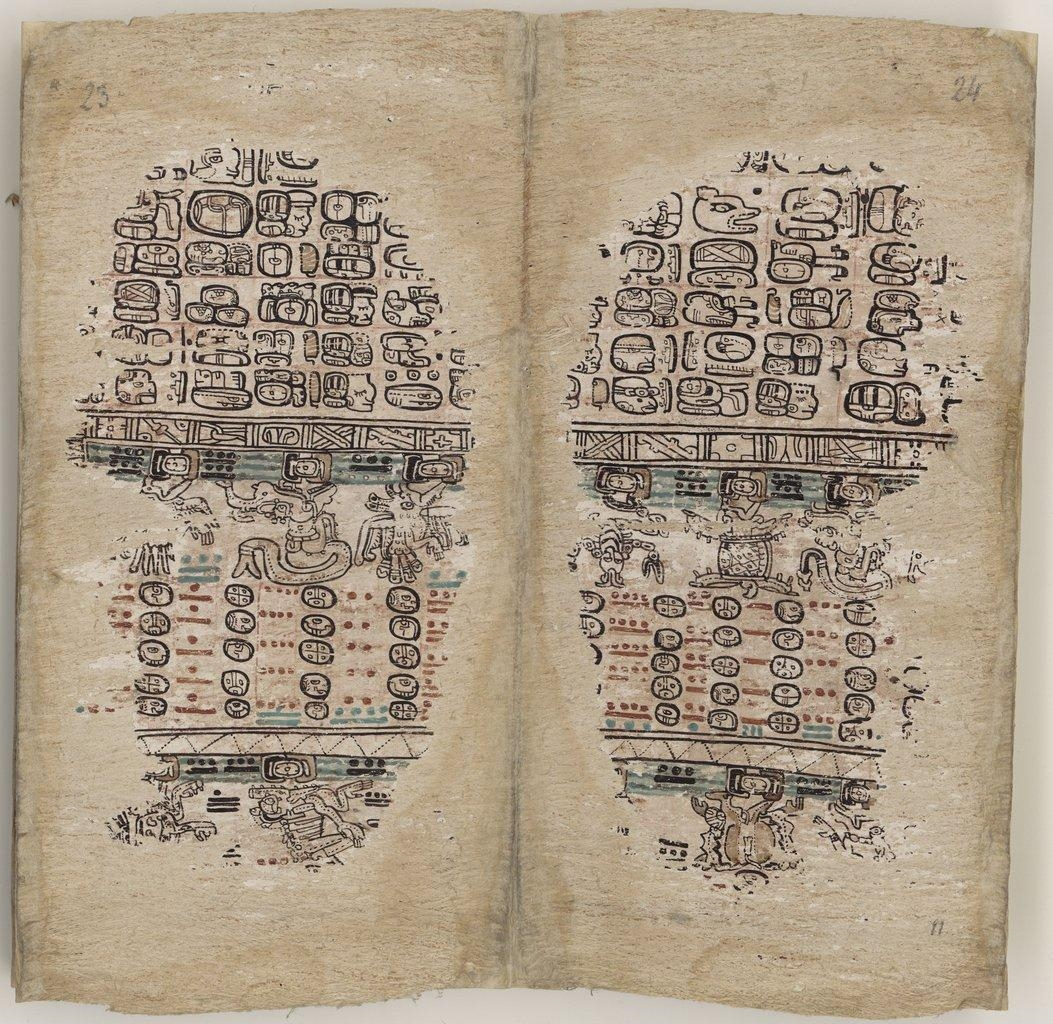
- The final two pages of the Paris Codex, showing the Maya "zodiac"
- Also known as: Codex Peresianus, Codex Pérez
- Type: codex
- Date: Postclassic period (c. AD 900–1521)
- Place of origin: Yucatán, Mexico
- Language: Maya
- Material: bark paper
- Size: 140 by 23.5 centimetres (55.1 by 9.3 in)
- Format: screenfold book
- Condition: badly damaged
- Script: Maya script
- Contents: ritual almanacs and calendrical information
- Discovered: 1859 in the Bibliothèque Imperiale

The Paris Codex (also known as the Codex Peresianus and Codex Pérez) is one of three surviving generally accepted pre-Columbian Maya books, dating to the Postclassic Period of Mesoamerican chronology (c. 900–1521 AD). The codex was originally part of a larger codex, with only the current fragments remaining, making it the shortest of the five codices. The document is very poorly preserved and has suffered considerable damage to the page edges, resulting in the loss of some of the text. The codex largely relates to a cycle of thirteen 20-year kʼatuns and includes details of Maya astronomical signs.

The Paris Codex is generally considered to have been painted in western Yucatán, probably at Mayapan. It has been tentatively dated to around 1450, in the Late Postclassic period (AD 1200–1525). More recently, an earlier date of 1185 has been suggested, placing the document in the Early Postclassic (AD 900–1200). However, the astronomical and calendrical information within the codex is consistent with a Classic period cycle from AD 731 to 987, indicating that the codex may be a copy of a much earlier document.

The Paris Codex was acquired by the Bibliothèque Royale of Paris in 1832 and is currently held at the Bibliothèque Nationale de France in Paris, in the Département des Manuscrits, catalogued as Mexicain 386.

== Physical characteristics ==
The codex consists of a strip measuring 140 centimetres (55 in) long by 23.5 centimetres (9.3 in) high, folded into 11 sheets painted on both sides, forming 22 pages total. An additional sheet is believed to have once existed, but became lost by the 19th century. The Paris Codex is very poorly preserved, comprising a number of fragments; the lime plaster coating of the codex is badly eroded at the edges, resulting in the destruction of its hieroglyphs and images except in the center of its pages.

== Content ==
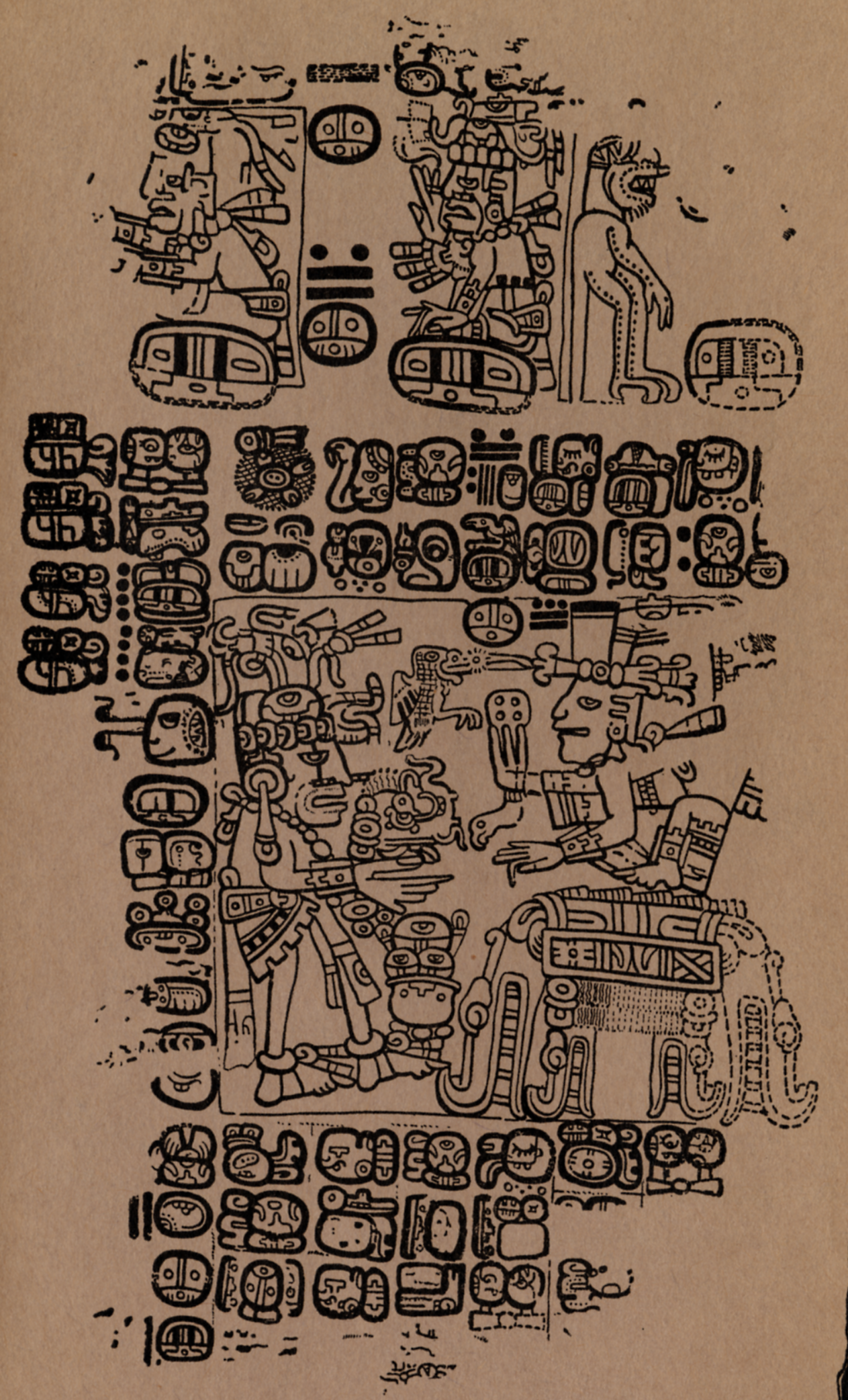
Page 3 of the Paris Codex, displaying the typical combination of a standing and a seated figure

The content of the codex is mainly ritual in nature, and one side of the codex contains the patron deities and associated rituals for a cycle of thirteen kʼatuns (a 20-year Maya calendrical cycle). One fragment contains animals that represent astronomical signs along the ecliptic including a scorpion and a peccary; fragments of this Maya "zodiac" are depicted on two pages of the codex. Some pages of the codex are marked with annotations made with Latin characters.

On one side of the codex the general format of each page largely follows the same arrangement, with a standing figure on the left hand side and a seated figure on the right hand side. Each page also contains the ajaw day glyph combined with a numerical coefficient, in each case representing a date marking the final day of a calendrical cycle. In spite of the poor state of preservation of the document, enough text has survived to demonstrate that in the case of the Paris Codex, the main series of dates correspond to kʼatun-endings, allowing for the reconstruction of some of the lost date glyphs in the text. The seated figures are each associated with a sidereal glyph indicating that they represent the ruling deity of each kʼatun.

The reverse of the codex is more varied in nature and includes a section dedicated to a calendrical cycle ruled by Chaac, the god of rain. It also includes information about the prognostication of rainfall and maize crop yields, as well as information about spiritual forces. A set of two pages illustrates the days of the tzolkʼin 260-day cycle that correspond to the beginning of the solar year over a period of 52 years (a cycle of the Calendar Round). The final two pages of the codex depict a series of thirteen animals that represent the so-called "zodiac".

Modern studies of the codex have concluded that the end of the zodiac cycle illustrated within it show "a psychological predilection to Mayan fatalism," suggesting that the end of the Mayan Classic Period was the result of a self-fulfilling prophecy.

== Origin ==
In common with the other two generally accepted Maya codices (the Dresden Codex and the Madrid Codex), the document is likely to have been created in Yucatán; English Mayanist J. Eric S. Thompson thought it likely that the Paris Codex was painted in western Yucatán and dated to between AD 1250 and 1450. Bruce Love noted the similarities between a scene on page 11 of the codex and Stela 1 at Mayapan; based on this he proposed that the codex was produced in Mayapan around 1450. However, further analysis of the stela in question suggests an earlier date of 1185 indicating that the calendrical information may refer to an earlier kʼatun cycle than the one suggested by Love. The astronomical and calendrical information within the Paris Codex are consistent with a Classic period cycle from AD 731 to 987 indicating that the codex may be a copy of a much earlier document.

== Discovery ==
The Paris Codex came to light in 1859 when Léon de Rosny found it in a basket of old papers in the corner of a chimney in the Bibliothèque Impériale in Paris. The codex had apparently been examined some twenty-five years earlier by scholars and had been catalogued but it is not known how the document found its way to Paris. The document was found with a piece of paper attributing it to the collection of colonial Maya documents assembled by Juan Pío Pérez.

== Gallery ==
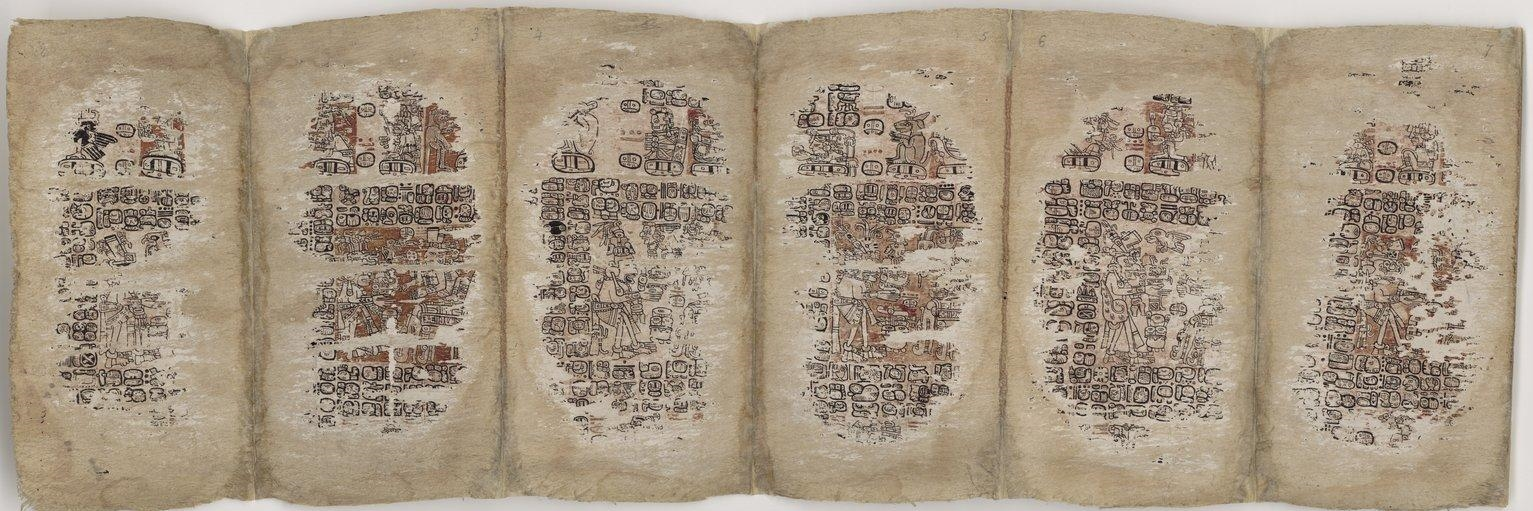
Pages 2–7

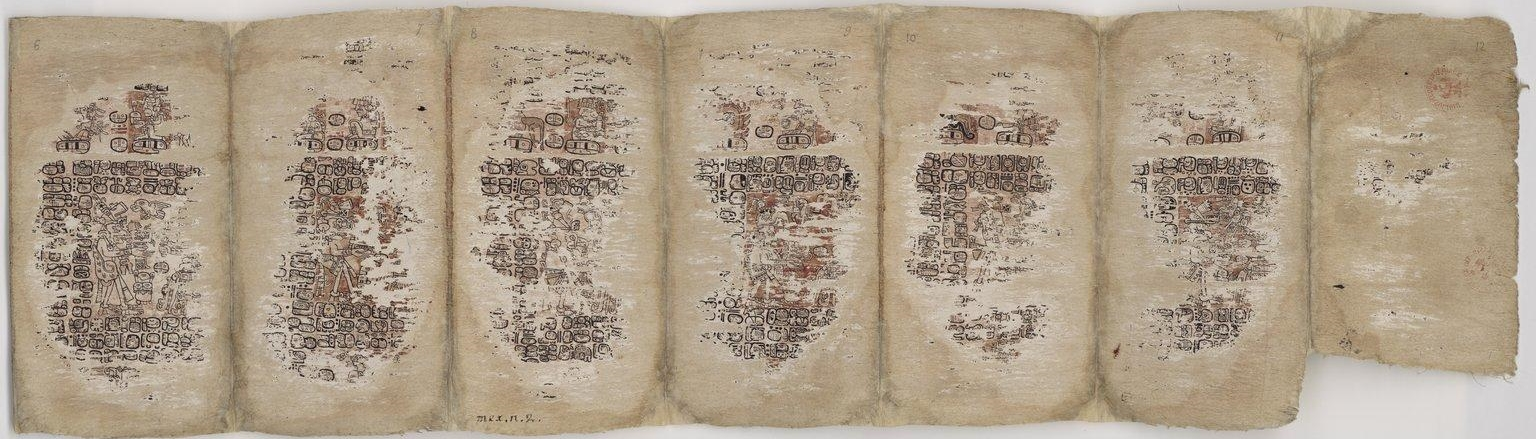
Pages 6–12

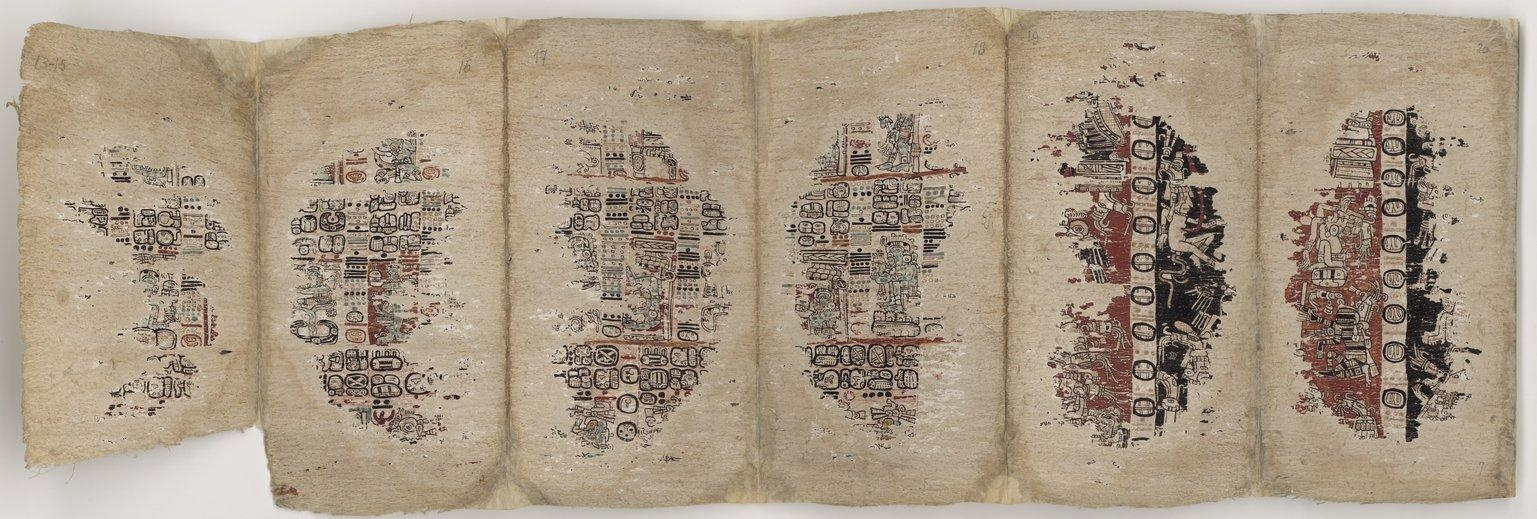
Pages 13–18

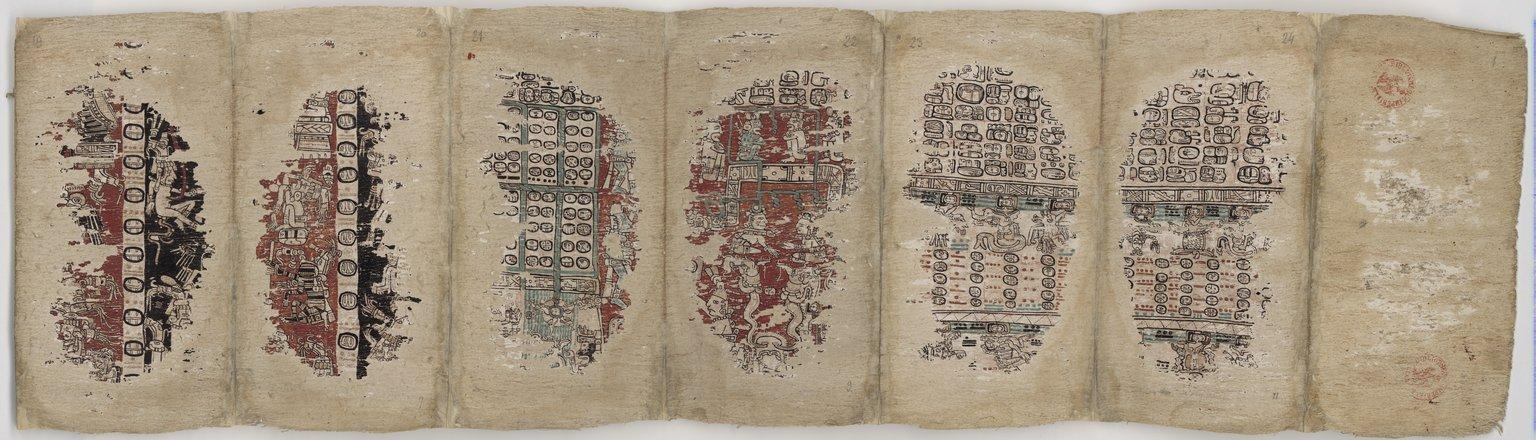
Pages 17–22 and page 1
