= Mayan Numerals (Unicode block) =

- Range: U+1D2E0..U+1D2FF (32 code points)
- Plane: SMP
- Scripts: Common
- Assigned: 20 code points
- Unused: 12 reserved code points

Unicode version history
- 11.0 (2018): 20 (+20)

Unicode documentation
- Code chart ∣ Web page

Mayan numerals, 1D2E0 to 1D2F3

Mayan Numerals is a Unicode block containing characters for the historical Mayan numeral system.

== Block ==
Mayan Numerals^{[1]}^{[2]} Official Unicode Consortium code chart (PDF)
	0	1	2	3	4	5	6	7	8	9	A	B	C	D	E	F
U+1D2Ex	𝋠	𝋡	𝋢	𝋣	𝋤	𝋥	𝋦	𝋧	𝋨	𝋩	𝋪	𝋫	𝋬	𝋭	𝋮	𝋯
U+1D2Fx	𝋰	𝋱	𝋲	𝋳												
Notes: 1. As of Unicode version 16.0; 2. Grey areas indicate non-assigned code points

== History ==
The following Unicode-related documents record the purpose and process of defining specific characters in the Mayan Numerals block:

Version	Final code points (Note: Proposed code points and characters names may differ from final code points and names)	Count	L2 ID	WG2 ID	Document
11.0	U+1D2E0..1D2F3	20	L2/16-264R	N4804	Quinn, Jameson (2016-09-26), Mayan Numerals
11.0	U+1D2E0..1D2F3	20	L2/16-342		Anderson, Deborah; Whistler, Ken; Pournader, Roozbeh; Glass, Andrew; Iancu, Laurențiu (2016-11-07), "1. Mayan", Recommendations to UTC #149 November 2016 on Script Proposals
11.0	U+1D2E0..1D2F3	20	L2/16-325		Moore, Lisa (2016-11-18), "C.8", UTC #149 Minutes
11.0	U+1D2E0..1D2F3	20	L2/17-110		Pallan, Carlos; Anderson, Debbie (2017-03-07), Mayan Numerals: Layout and reading order in Mayan historical texts
11.0	U+1D2E0..1D2F3	20	L2/17-153		Anderson, Deborah (2017-05-17), "15. Mayan Numerals", Recommendations to UTC #151 May 2017 on Script Proposals
