= Dresden Codex =

Maya manuscript

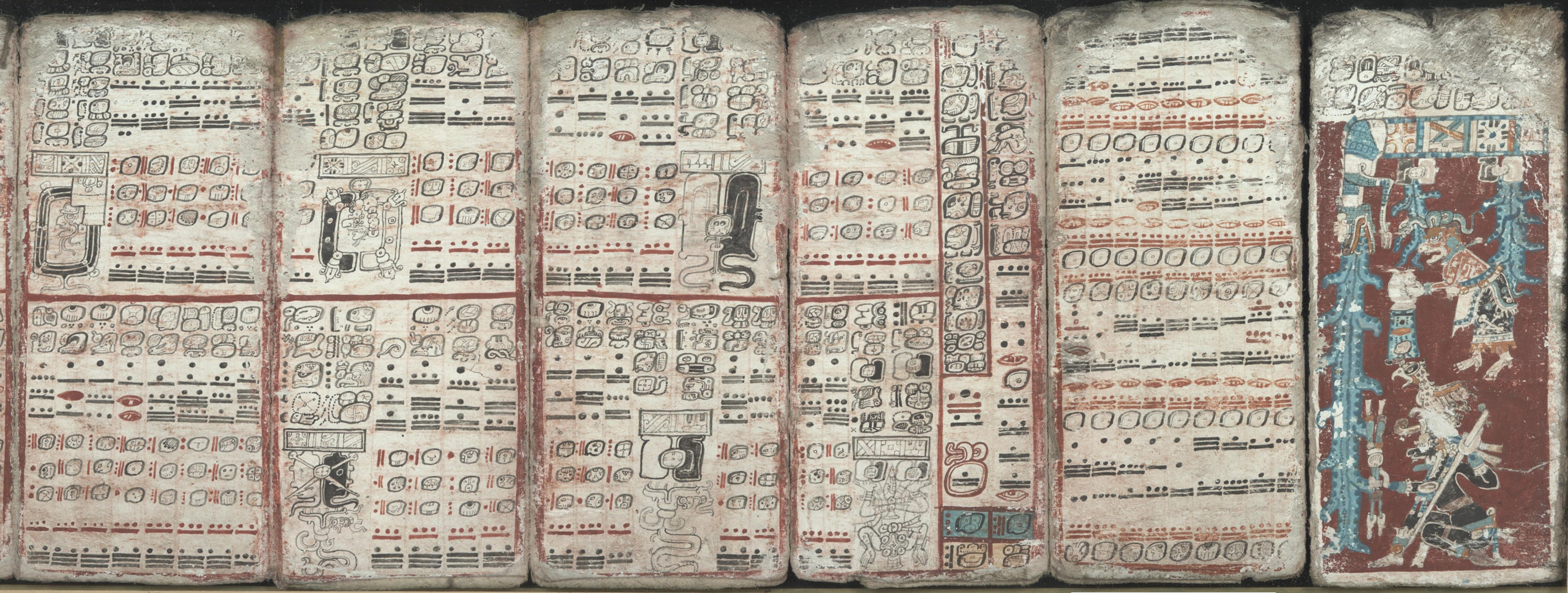
- Six pages of the Dresden codex: Pages (55–59, 74) on eclipses (left), multiplication tables, and a flood (far right)
- Language: Yucatec Maya
- Date: c. 1200–1345; Discovered in 1739
- Provenance: Chichen Itzá, Mexico
- Length: 78 pages

The Dresden Codex is a Maya book originating from the region of Chichén Itzá in Mexico. It is one of the oldest surviving book written in the Americas, dating to the 11th or 12th century. The codex was rediscovered in the city of Dresden, Germany, hence the book's present name. It is located in the museum of the Saxon State Library. The codex contains information relating to astronomical and astrological tables, religious references, seasons of the earth, and illness and medicine. It also includes information about conjunctions of planets and moons.

The book suffered serious water damage during World War II. The pages are made of amate, 20 centimetres (7.9 in) high, and can be folded accordion-style; when unfolded the codex is 3.7 metres (12 ft) long. It is written in Mayan hieroglyphs and refers to an original text of some three or four hundred years earlier, describing local history and astronomical tables. Like all other pre-Hispanic books from Mesoamerica, the Dresden Codex takes the form of a screenfold. The pages consist of a paper made from the pounded inner bark of a wild species of fig, Ficus cotinifolia, (hu'un in Maya—a word that became semantically equivalent to "book").

== Description ==
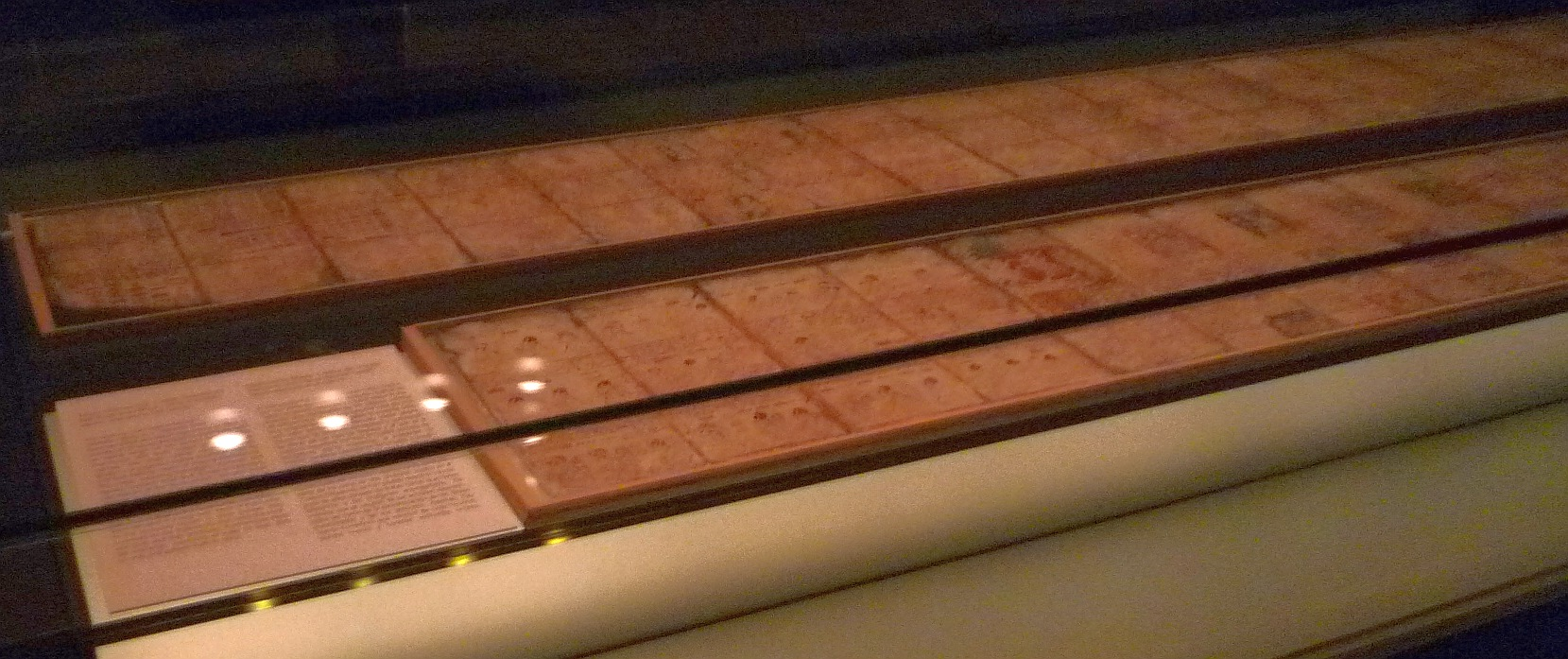
Exhibition of the codex, with the backsides visible through mirrors, Saxon State Library, Dresden

The Dresden Codex contains 78 pages with decorative board covers on the front and back. Most pages have writing on both sides. They have a border of red paint, although many have lost this framing due to age deterioration. The pages are generally divided into three sections; students of the codex have arbitrarily labeled these sections a, b, and c. Some pages have just two horizontal sections, while one has four and another five sections. The individual sections with their own theme are generally separated by a red vertical line. Sections are generally divided into two to four columns.

The Dresden Codex is one of four hieroglyphic Maya codices that survived the Spanish Inquisition in the New World. Three, the Dresden, Madrid, and Paris codices, are named after the city where they were ultimately rediscovered. The fourth is the Maya Codex of Mexico, the oldest and only codex still located in the Americas. The Dresden Codex is held by the Saxon State and University Library Dresden (SLUB Dresden, Saxon State Library) in Dresden, Germany. The Maya codices all have about the same size pages, with a height of about 20 centimetres (7.9 in) and a width of 10 centimetres (3.9 in).

The pictures and glyphs were painted by skilled craftsmen using thin brushes and vegetable dyes. Black and red were the main colors used for many of the pages. Some pages have detailed backgrounds in shades of yellow, green, and the Mayan blue. The codex was written by eight different scribes, who all had their own writing style, glyph designs, and subject matter.

== History ==
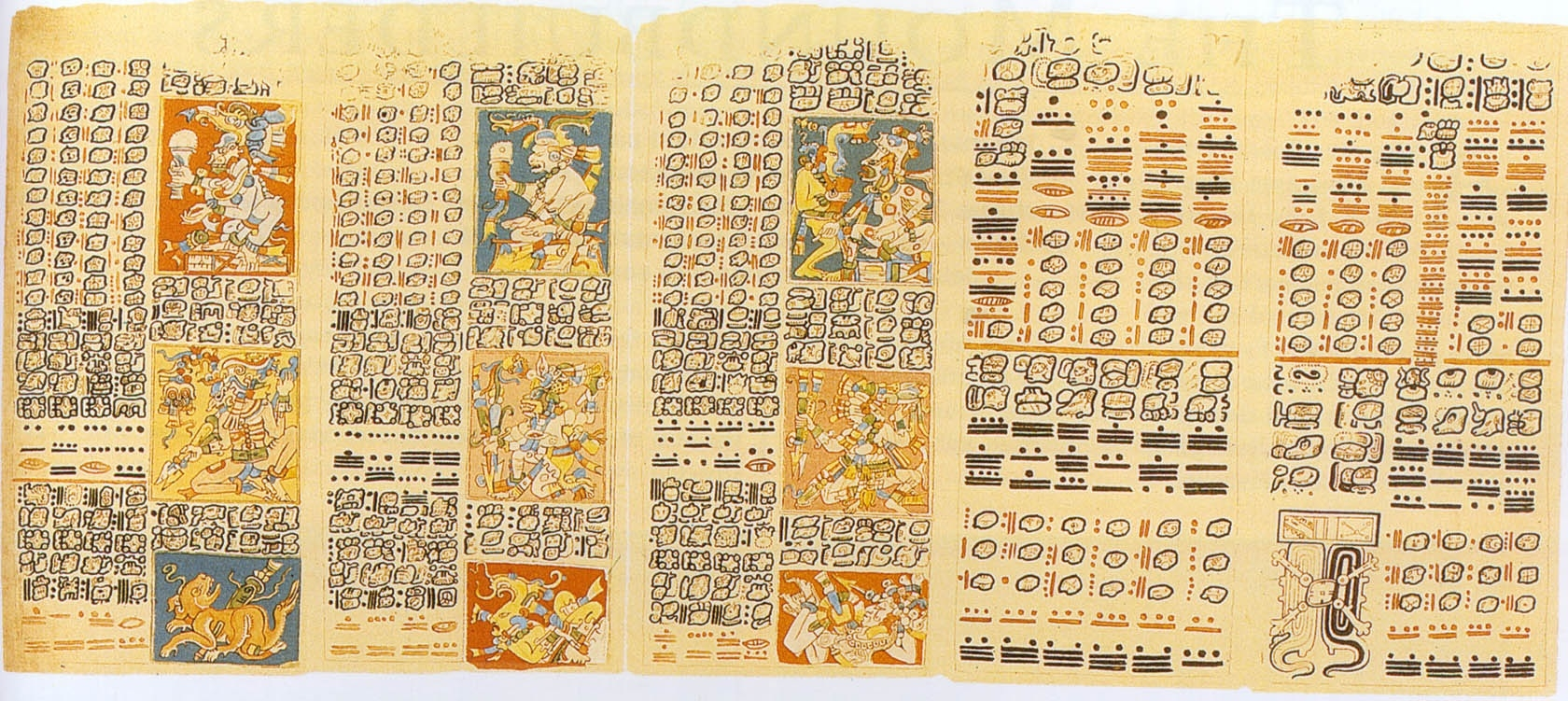
First publication in 1810 by Humboldt, who repainted five pages for his atlas

The Dresden Codex is described by historian J. Eric S. Thompson as writings of the indigenous people of the Yucatán Peninsula in southeastern Mexico. Maya historians Peter J. Schmidt, Mercedes de la Garza, and Enrique Nalda confirm this. Thompson further narrows the probable origin of the Dresden Codex to the area of Chichen Itza, because certain picture symbols in the codex are only found on monuments in that location. He also argues that the astronomical tables would support this as the place of origin. Thompson claims that the people of the Yucatán Peninsula were known to have done such studies around 1200 A.D. Thompson also notes the similar ceramic designs in the Chichen Itza area which are known to have ceased in the early thirteenth century. British historian Clive Ruggles suggests, based on the analyses of several scholars, that the Dresden Codex is a copy and was originally written between the twelfth and fourteenth centuries. Thompson narrows the date closer to 1200 to 1250. Maya archaeologist Linton Satterthwaite puts the date when it was made as no later than 1345.

Johann Christian Götze (1692–1749), German theologian and director of the Royal Library at Dresden, purchased the codex from a private owner in Vienna in 1739 while traveling to Italy. Thompson speculates that the codex was sent as a tribute to Charles V, Holy Roman Emperor by Hernán Cortés, governor of Mexico, since examples of local writings and other Maya items were sent to the king in 1519 when he was living in Vienna. The codex was eventually catalogued into the Royal Library of Dresden in 1744, where it remained relatively obscure until the early twentieth century.

Alexander von Humboldt published pages 47, 48 and 50–52 from the Dresden Codex in his 1810 atlas Vues des Cordillères et Monuments des Peuples Indigènes de l'Amérique, the first reproduction of any of its pages. The first copy of the codex was published by Lord Kingsborough in his 1831 Antiquities of Mexico. In 1828 Constantine Samuel Rafinesque had identified this book as being of Maya origin based on its glyphs looking like those found at Palenque. Historian Cyrus Thomas made a connection between the codex and the 260 year cycle ("Ahau Katun") of the Maya calendar and the 365 days in a year. Ruggles shows that in the codex the Maya related their 260-day calendar to celestial bodies, especially Venus and Mars.

The codex has played a key role in the deciphering of Mayan hieroglyphs. Dresden librarian Ernst Wilhelm Förstemann published the first complete facsimile in 1880. He deciphered the calendar section of the codex, including the Maya numerals used therein. Förstemann determined that these numbers, along with deities and day names, related to the Mayan calendar and the Mayan Long Count calendar. In the 1950s Yuri Knorozov used a phonetic approach based on the De Landa alphabet for decoding the codex, which was followed up in the 1980s by other scholars that did additional deciphering based on this concept.

Paul Schellhas in 1897 and 1904 assigned letters to gods for specific glyphs since they had several possible names. For example God D could be Hunab Ku Itzam Na among several other names and God A could be Cizin (god of death) among others. The Schellhas system of assigning letters for the gods represented by certain glyphs as a noncommittal system was adopted by later researchers of Maya codices.

The Dresden Codex contains accurate astronomical tables, which are recognized by students of the codex for its detailed Venus tables and lunar tables. The lunar series has intervals correlating with eclipses, while the Venus tables correlate with the movements of the planet Venus. The codex also contains astrological tables and ritual schedules. The religious references show in a cycle of a 260-day ritual calendar the important Maya royal events. The codex also includes information on the Maya new-year ceremony tradition. The rain god Chaac is represented 134 times.

== Image ==
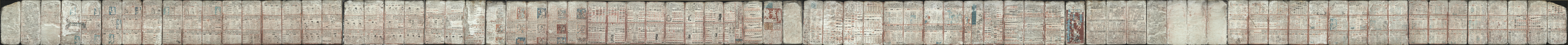
The complete Dresden Codex in the correct reading sequence (pages 1–24, 46–74, 25–45) from left to right, including empty pages

== Deterioration and pagination ==
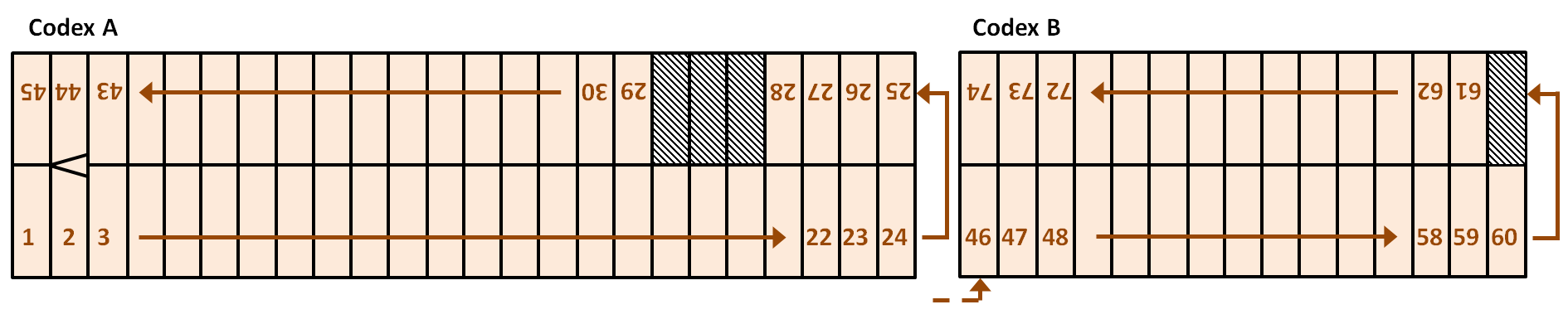
First page sequencing of the codex by Agostino Aglio

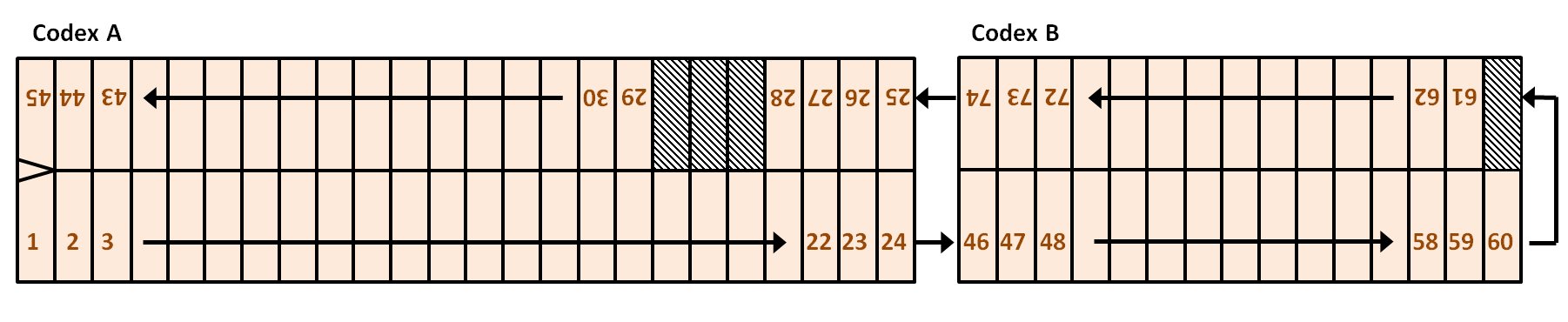
Correct reading order of the pages within the codex

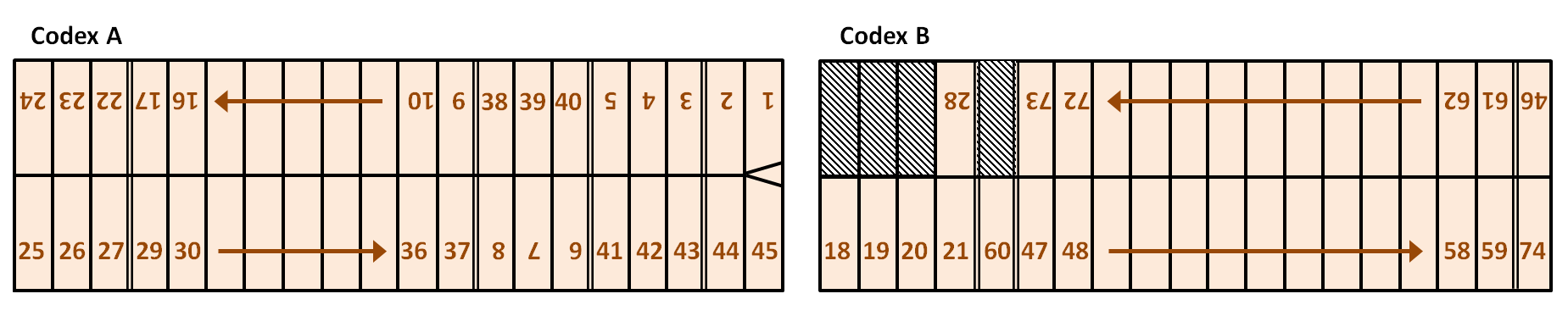
The presentation of the Dresden Codex since 1945

Italian artist and engraver Agostino Aglio, starting in 1826, became the first to transcribe and illustrate the codex completely for Irish antiquarian Lord Kingsborough, who published it in his nine volumes of Antiquities of Mexico in 1831–48. The codex then had some damage due to handling, sunlight, and moisture.

It received direct water damage that was significantly destructive, from being kept in a flooded basement during the World War II bombing of Dresden in February 1945. German historian G. Zimmerman later noted that the damage was extreme on pages 2, 4, 24, 28, 34, 38, 71 and 72. Certain details of the glyph images have been lost because of this. The damage is apparent when the current codex is compared to the Kingsborough copies of 1831–48 and the Förstemann facsimile editions from 1880 and 1892.

Today's page numbers were assigned by Aglio when he became the first to transcribe the manuscript in 1825–26. For this, he divided the original codex into two parts, labeled Codex A and Codex B. He sequenced Codex A on the front side followed by its back side, with the same order on Codex B.

Today, historians such as Helmut Deckert and Ferdinand Anders understand that a codex reading should traverse the complete front side followed by the complete back side of the manuscript, i.e., pages 1–24 followed by 46–74 and 25–45. The librarian K. C. Falkenstein adjusted the relative position of pages for "esthetical reasons" in 1836, resulting in today's two similar length parts. While deciphering the codex, the librarian E. W. Förstemann noticed an error in Aglio's page assignment of the sheets 1/45 and 2/44, so he correctly reassigned Aglio's pages 44 and 45 to become pages 1 and 2. The reversal of the sheets 6/40, 7/39 and 8/38 is due to an error when the sheets were returned to their protective glass cabinet after drying from the water damage due to the bombing of Dresden in 1945.

== See also ==
- Madrid Codex (Maya)
- Paris Codex
- Maya Codex of Mexico
- Popol Vuh

== Bibliography ==
- American Anthropologist (1891). American Anthropologist. American Anthropological Association.
- Coe, S.D. (1982). Maya Hieroglyphic Codices. Institute for Mesoamerican Studies, State University of New York at Albany.
- Deckert, Helmut (1989). Die Dresdner Maya-Handschrift (in German). Akademische Druck-u. Verlagsanstalt. ISBN 978-3-201-01478-6.
- Foster, Lynn V. (2005). Handbook to Life in the Ancient Maya World. Oxford University Press. ISBN 978-0-19-518363-4.
- Grube, Nikolai K. "Dresden, Codex." In David Carraco (ed). The Oxford Encyclopedia of Mesoamerican Cultures. : Oxford University Press, 2001.
- Keane, A. H. (9 June 2011). Man: Past and Present. Cambridge University Press. ISBN 978-0-521-23410-8.
- Lyons, Martyn (2011). Books: A Living History. J. Paul Getty Museum. ISBN 978-1-60606-083-4. "It dates from the eleventh or twelfth century, making it the earliest surviving book from the Americas."
- Nalda, Enrique (1998). Maya. Rizzoli. ISBN 978-0-8478-2129-7.
- Ruggles, Clive L. N. (2005). Ancient Astronomy: An Encyclopedia of Cosmologies and Myth. ABC-CLIO. ISBN 978-1-85109-477-6.
- Sharer, Robert J. (2006). The Ancient Maya. Stanford University Press. ISBN 978-0-8047-4817-9.
- Smithsonian Institution (1897). Annual Report of the Bureau of American Ethnology to the Secretary of the Smithsonian Institution. U.S. Government Printing Office.
- Taube, Karl A. (1992). The Major Gods of Ancient Yucatan. Dumbarton Oaks. ISBN 978-0-88402-204-6.
- Thomas, Cyrus (1894). The Maya Year. U.S. Government Printing Office. p. 15.
- Thompson, John Eric Sidney (1972). A Commentary on the Dresden Codex: A Maya Hieroglyphic Book. American Philosophical Society. ISBN 978-0-87169-093-7.
