= Ernst Förstemann =

German historian, archivist and librarian (1822–1906)

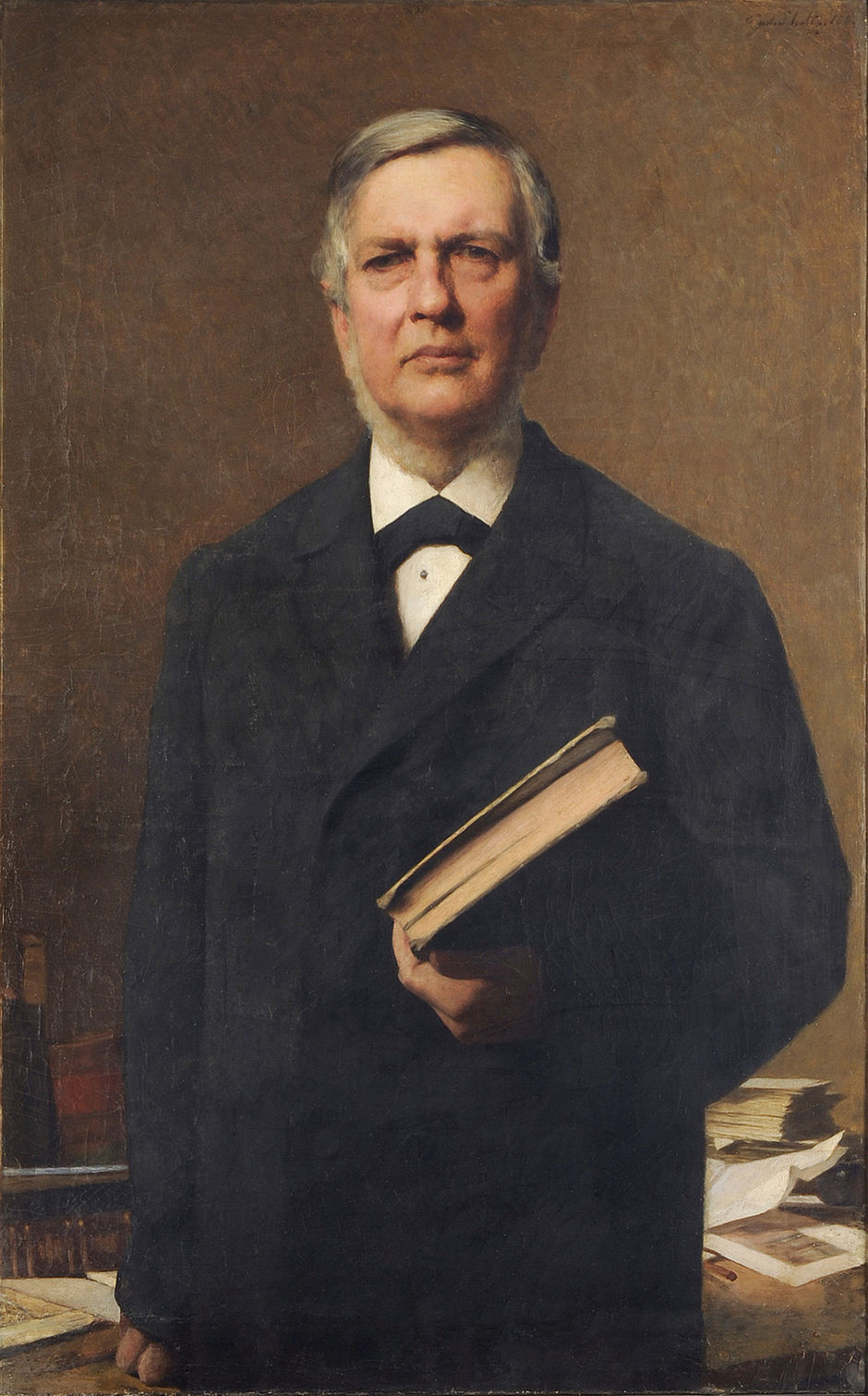
Ernst Förstemann, oil on canvas by Julius Scholtz

Ernst Wilhelm Förstemann (Danzig, 18 September 1822 – Charlottenburg, 4 November 1906) was a German historian, mathematician, doctor of linguistics, librarian, and director of the Saxon State Library (German: Sächsische Landesbibliothek) in Dresden. He is known as a founder of onomastics and folk etymology studies in Germany, and also for his seminal contributions made in the early years of Mayanist research, towards the decipherment and understanding of calendrical elements in the pre-Columbian Maya script. He was the first European to understand and interpret the Maya number system, their use of the “zero,” and their calendar system.

== Biography ==
Ernst Wilhelm Förstemann was born in Danzig as the son of the mathematician Wilhelm August Förstemann. His family was originally from Nordhausen. From 1831 to 1840 he was educated at the local grammar school, where his father was a Mathematics schoolmaster. In 1840, Förstemann matriculated in Comparative linguistics at the Humboldt University of Berlin. In 1841, he moved to Halle (Saale), where he continued his studies at the Martin Luther University of Halle-Wittenberg. While at university, Förstemann was mentored by Karl Lachmann, Franz Bopp and August Friedrich Pott.

Upon his return from Halle, Förstemann was appointed assistant teacher at the Danzig grammar school and also worked as a private tutor until 1848. In 1845 he took the Staatsexamen in Berlin. Förstemann was also the only contestant in a competition hosted by Jacob Grimm that required a list of names that were in use in Germany until the year of 1100. Although he only submitted a draft, he won the prize and was encouraged by Grimm to publish the completed work in 1858.

When Förstemann was offered a position as librarian at the Fürst zu Stolberg-Wernigerodesche Bibliothek in 1851, he gave up his position at Danzig and went to Wernigerode. Also, he added about 20,000 volumes to the library's holdings . In addition to his work as librarian, Förstemann also accepted a teaching assignment at the local grammar school.

In 1865 Förstemann was invited to Dresden by the widow of Frederick William IV of Prussia, where he succeeded Gustav Klemm as chief librarian at the Royal Public Library (now the Saxon State Library), which contained the Dresden Codex. Förstemann reorganized the library and began to work on a new catalogue. Förstemann resigned in 1887, aged 65, in favour of the less strenuous task of overseeing the King's private library and the library of the Sekundogenitur (Dresden). For his services Förstemann received the Albert Order in 1892. In the following years, Förstemann prepared an edition of the Maya manuscript as well as several treatises on it. His services in behalf of the reorganization of the library were most important. In 1894 he deciphered the Maya numbering systems.

In 1899, Förstemann retired and moved to Charlottenburg one year later, where he died on 4 November 1906.

== Works (selected) ==
- Altdeutsches namenbuch [sic!], 2 vols., 1856/59 (2nd and 3rd edd. 1900-1913). A discussion of old German proper names, the first volume being devoted to names of persons, and the second to places.
- Über die Gräflich Stolbergische Bibliothek zu Wernigerode, 1866
- Mitteilungen der königlichen öffentlichen Bibliothek zu Dresden, 1866 ff.
- Geschichte des deutschen Sprachstammes, 2 vols. 1874/75 (Reissued 1966; called by some his most important work)
- Graf Christian Ernst zu Stolberg-Wernigerode, Hannover 1886.
- Zur Entzifferung der Mayahandschriften, 7 vols. 1887/98
- Aus dem alten Danzig, 1820-40, 1900
- Zur Geschichte der Bücher-Sammlungen in der Grafschaft Wernigerode bis zum Dreißigjährigen Kriege, insbesondere der Sammlung Graf Wolfgang Ernst zu Stolberg (angelegt von etwa 1569–1606)., undated MS.
