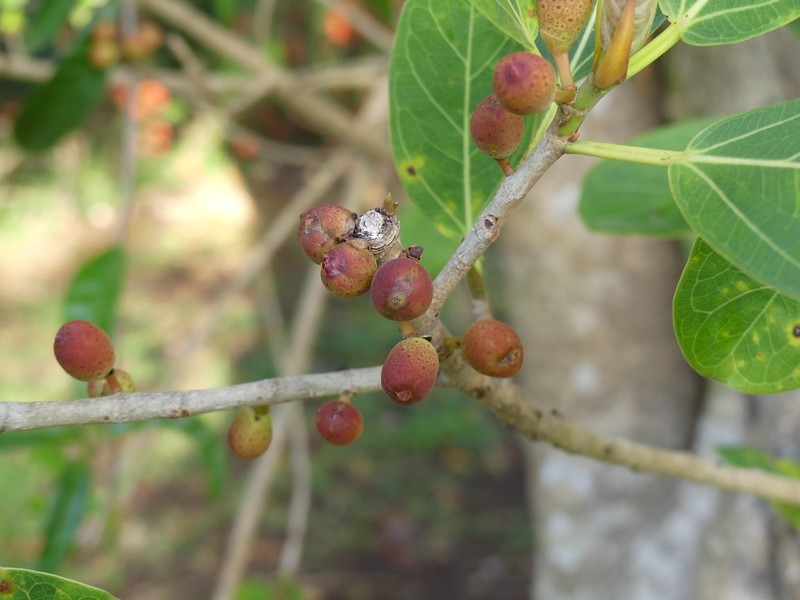
- Fruit and leaves
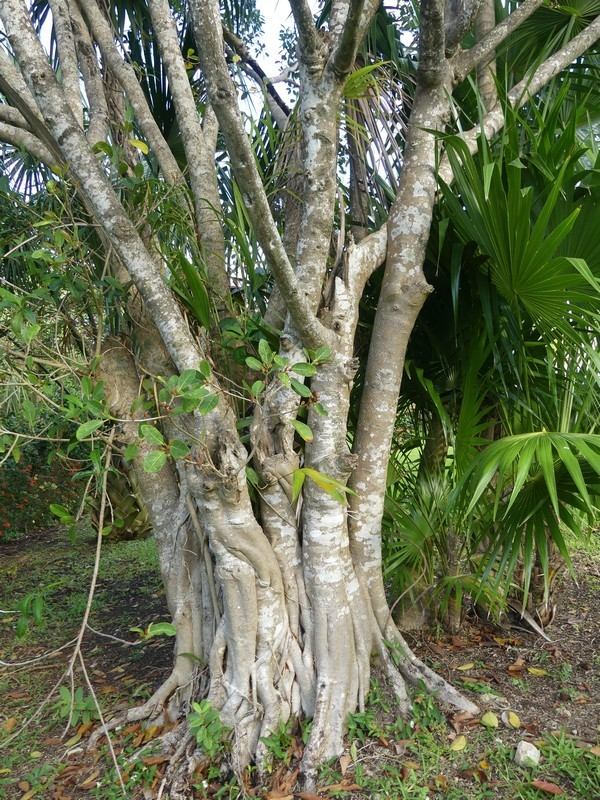
- Trunk

Conservation status
- Least Concern (IUCN 3.1)

Scientific classification
- Kingdom: Plantae
- Clade: Tracheophytes
- Clade: Angiosperms
- Clade: Eudicots
- Clade: Rosids
- Order: Rosales
- Family: Moraceae
- Genus: Ficus
- Species: F. cotinifolia

Binomial name
- Ficus cotinifolia Kunth

Synonyms
- List: Ficus cotinifolia subsp. myxifolia (Kunth) Carvajal; Ficus glauca (Liebm.) Miq.; Ficus guatemalana (Miq.) Miq.; Ficus inamoena Standl.; Ficus jacquelineae Carvajal & Peña-Pin.; Ficus longipes (Liebm.) Miq.; Ficus myxifolia Kunth & C.D.Bouché; Ficus paraisoana Lundell; Ficus subrotundifolia Greenm.; Urostigma cotinifolium (Kunth) Miq.; Urostigma glaucum Liebm.; Urostigma guatemalanum Miq.; Urostigma longipes Liebm.; Urostigma myxifolium (Kunth & C.D.Bouché) Miq.

= Ficus cotinifolia =

Species of plant

Ficus cotinifolia, the alamo tree, is a species of flowering plant in the family Moraceae, native to seasonally dry tropical areas of Mexico and Central America. It often sends roots down to cenotes and other underground water sources.
