= Morus microphylla =

Conservation status
- Least Concern (IUCN 3.1)

Scientific classification
- Kingdom: Plantae
- Clade: Tracheophytes
- Clade: Angiosperms
- Clade: Eudicots
- Clade: Rosids
- Order: Rosales
- Family: Moraceae
- Genus: Morus
- Species: M. microphylla

Binomial name
- Morus microphylla Buckley
- Range map of M. microphylla from Atlas of United States Trees (1976)

Synonyms
- Morus confinis Greene; Morus grisea Greene; Morus radulina Greene

Species of flowering plant

Morus microphylla, the Texas mulberry, is a species of flowering plant in the family Moraceae. It is a shrub or tree native to northern Mexico and to central and west Texas, southwestern Oklahoma, and the southern half of New Mexico and Arizona in the United States. It grows in canyons and on slopes, usually near streams, from 200–2,200 metres (660–7,220 feet) in elevation.

Morus microphylla is a shrub or tree, sometimes reaching 7.5 m (25 ft) in height. It has much smaller leaves than the other two species native to the US (M. alba and M. rubra), the blade usually less than 7 centimetres (2 3/4 inches) long; the leaves are dark green on top, paler and hairy on the bottom.. It is dioecious (that is, each plant has only male or only female flowers), with clusters of tiny flowers appearing in spring along with the leaves. The edible fruits are red, purple, or nearly black, about 1/2 inch (1.3 cm) long, and are consumed by wildlife, and, historically, by Native Americans. In ancient (probably prehistoric) times, the Havasupai people introduced the species to the Grand Canyon.

The species was described by Samuel Botsford Buckley in 1862. Some authorities treat it as a synonym of Morus celtidifolia.
