= Xalitla azteca =

Scientific classification
- Domain: Eukaryota
- Kingdom: Animalia
- Phylum: Arthropoda
- Class: Insecta
- Order: Coleoptera
- Suborder: Polyphaga
- Infraorder: Cucujiformia
- Family: Cerambycidae
- Genus: Xalitla
- Species: X. azteca

Binomial name
- Xalitla azteca Lane, 1959

Species of beetle

Xalitla azteca is a species of beetle in the family Cerambycidae. It was described by Lane in 1959.
