= Xalitla genuina =

Scientific classification
- Domain: Eukaryota
- Kingdom: Animalia
- Phylum: Arthropoda
- Class: Insecta
- Order: Coleoptera
- Suborder: Polyphaga
- Infraorder: Cucujiformia
- Family: Cerambycidae
- Genus: Xalitla
- Species: X. genuina

Binomial name
- Xalitla genuina Martins, 1970

Species of beetle

Xalitla genuina is a species of beetle in the family Cerambycidae. It was described by Martins in 1970.
