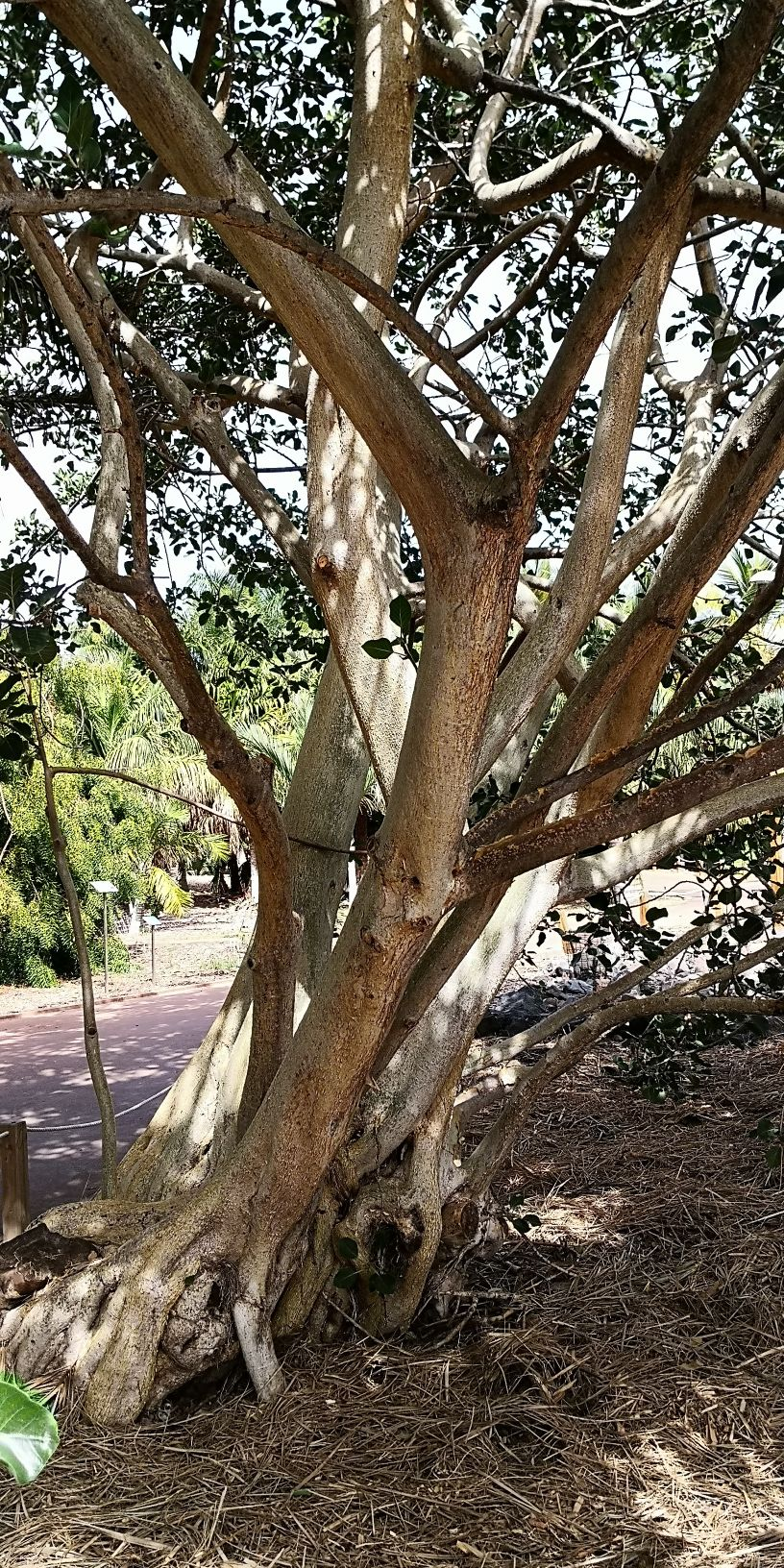

Conservation status
- Least Concern (IUCN 3.1)

Scientific classification
- Kingdom: Plantae
- Clade: Tracheophytes
- Clade: Angiosperms
- Clade: Eudicots
- Clade: Rosids
- Order: Rosales
- Family: Moraceae
- Genus: Ficus
- Subgenus: F. subg. Urostigma
- Species: F. petiolaris

Binomial name
- Ficus petiolaris Kunth

Synonyms
- Ficus brandegeei Standl.; Ficus jaliscana S.Watson; Ficus palmeri S. Watson; Ficus petiolaris subsp. brandegeei (Standl.) Felger; Ficus petiolaris subsp. jaliscana (S.Watson) Carvajal; Ficus petiolaris subsp. palmeri (S. Watson) Felger & Lowe; Urostigma petiolare Miq.

= Ficus petiolaris =

Species of fruit and plant

Ficus petiolaris, commonly known as petiolate fig, rock fig, and amacóztic, is a fig that is endemic to Mexico from Baja California and Sonora south to Oaxaca. It grows best with moderate water and partial shade. A unique feature is white hairs on the vein axils. Other common names include the Baja California rock fig, Palmer wild fig, and Brandegee wild fig.

== Description ==
They are trees that reach a size of 30 metres in height, or 8 to 10 m when it's cultivated as a houseplant. The trunk has a yellowish greenish color. The leaves are heart-shaped, on the front they are bright green and on the back they have a tuft of whitish hairs. The flowers and fruits are green, spherical in shape, with red and velvety spots. The crown of the tree is rounded.

== Taxonomy ==
=== Taxonomic history ===
German botanist Carl Sigismund Kunth described this species in 1817.

=== Etymology ===
Ficus is the generic name that is derived from the Latin name given to the fig, and petiolaris is a Latin epithet meaning "with petiole".

==== Nomenclature ====
- English: Petiolate fig, rock fig, Baja California rock fig, Palmer wild fig, Brandegee wild fig
- Spanish and native names: Higuera, amate, zalate, higuera cimarrona, higuera silvestre

== Distribution and habitat ==
Originally from Mexico, it is present in warm, semi-warm and temperate climates, between 550 and 1200 meters above sea level. Wild plant, associated with deciduous and sub-deciduous tropical forests, thorny forest, mesophilic mountain forest, oak and pine forests. In the Baja California Peninsula, this plant occurs from the southern Sierra de la Asamblea in central Baja California south into the Cape region of Baja California Sur, also present on many adjacent Gulf of California islands.

== Uses ==
The bark was traditionally used by the Aztecs to make paper, known as amate. Many of the remaining Aztec codices were written on amate.

In the 16th century, Francisco Hernández de Toledo relates: "the cooking of the roots and bark moisten the tongue of those who have a fever, relieves the pains of the chest and if they are not removed milk evacuates bile and phlegmatic humors by the Upper or lower duct. Cure inveterate ulcers of the lips or any other. " In the 20th century, Maximino Martinez, referred to as astringent, to heal fractures, cracks in gums, herpes and pectoral.

In Mexico, this species is recommended against intestinal parasites, herpes, cough, spleen stones, to regulate menstruation and heal fractures.

In Sonora it is advised in cases of goiter, chest pains, phlegm, wounds and ulcers. In Morelos it is used to attenuate the fever. The treatment includes latex, juice or resin.

In Michoacán, against the hepatitis the macerated bark is prepared and put to soak one day to apply baths, in addition to taking it fasting for nine days.

Under its synonym Ficus palmeri this plant has gained the Royal Horticultural Society's Award of Garden Merit.

== Gallery ==
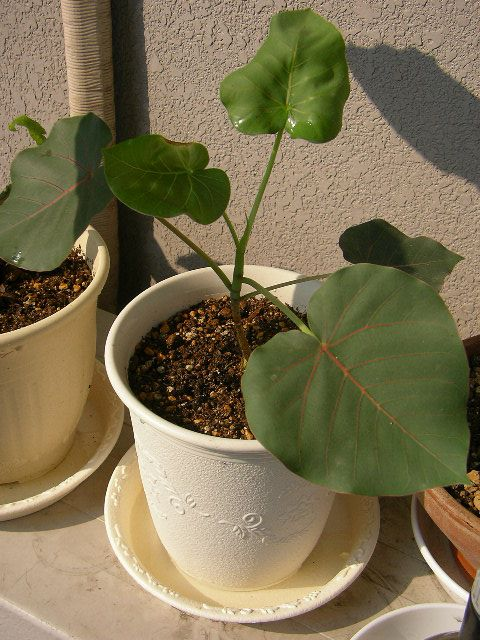
Young plant

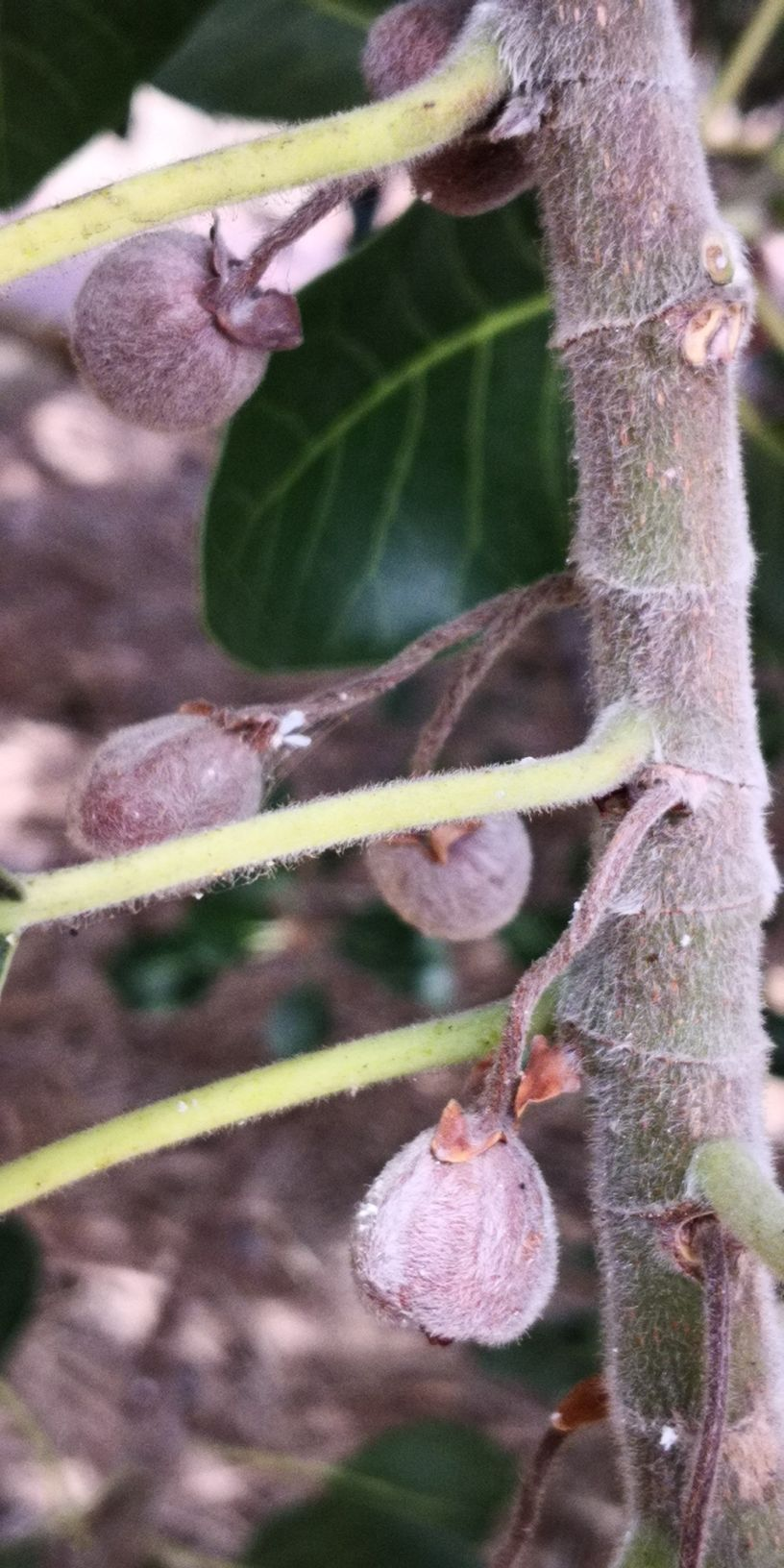
Fruits

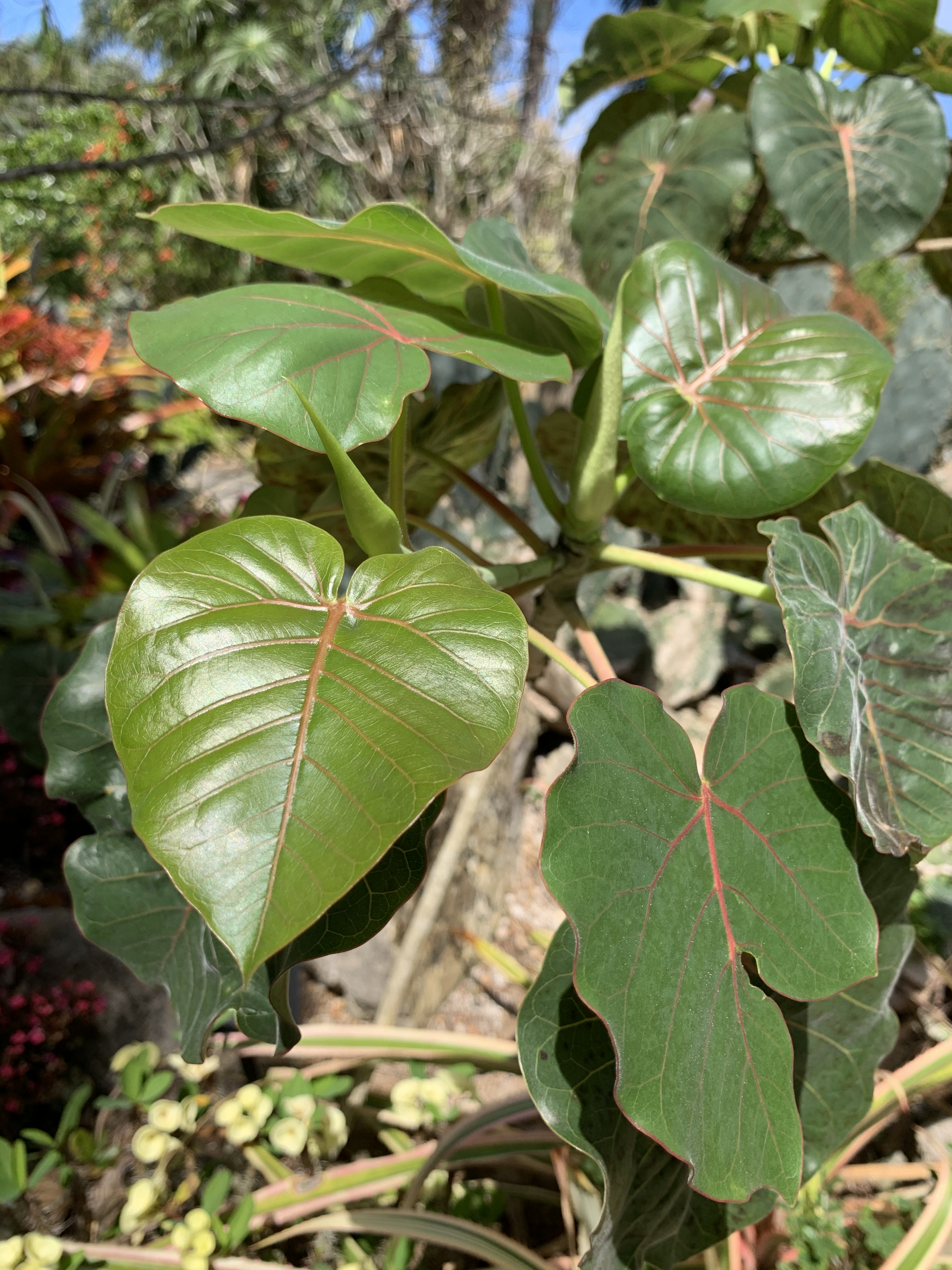
Leaves

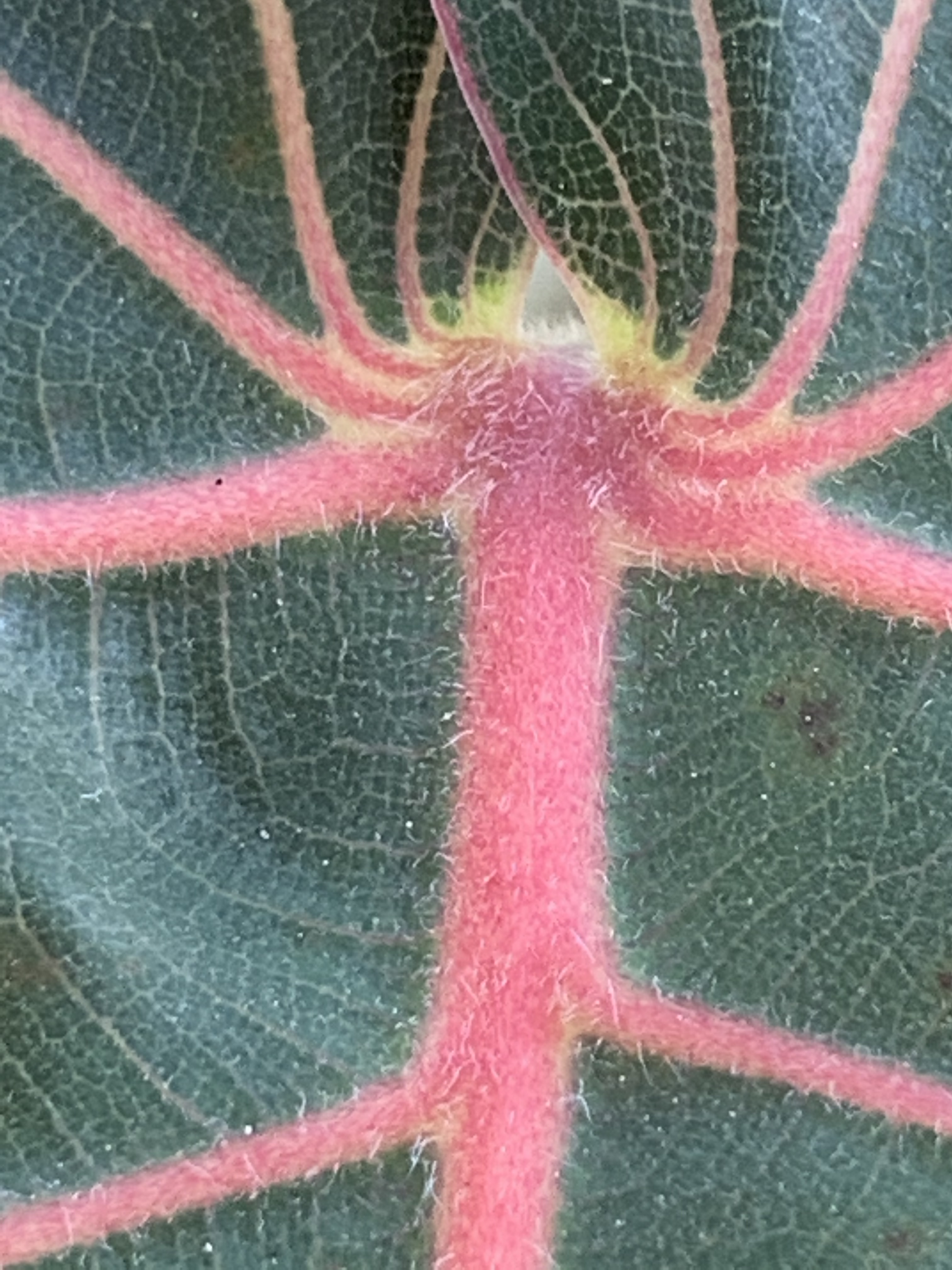
White hairs along vein axils
