= San Pablito, Puebla =

San Pablito
- Town
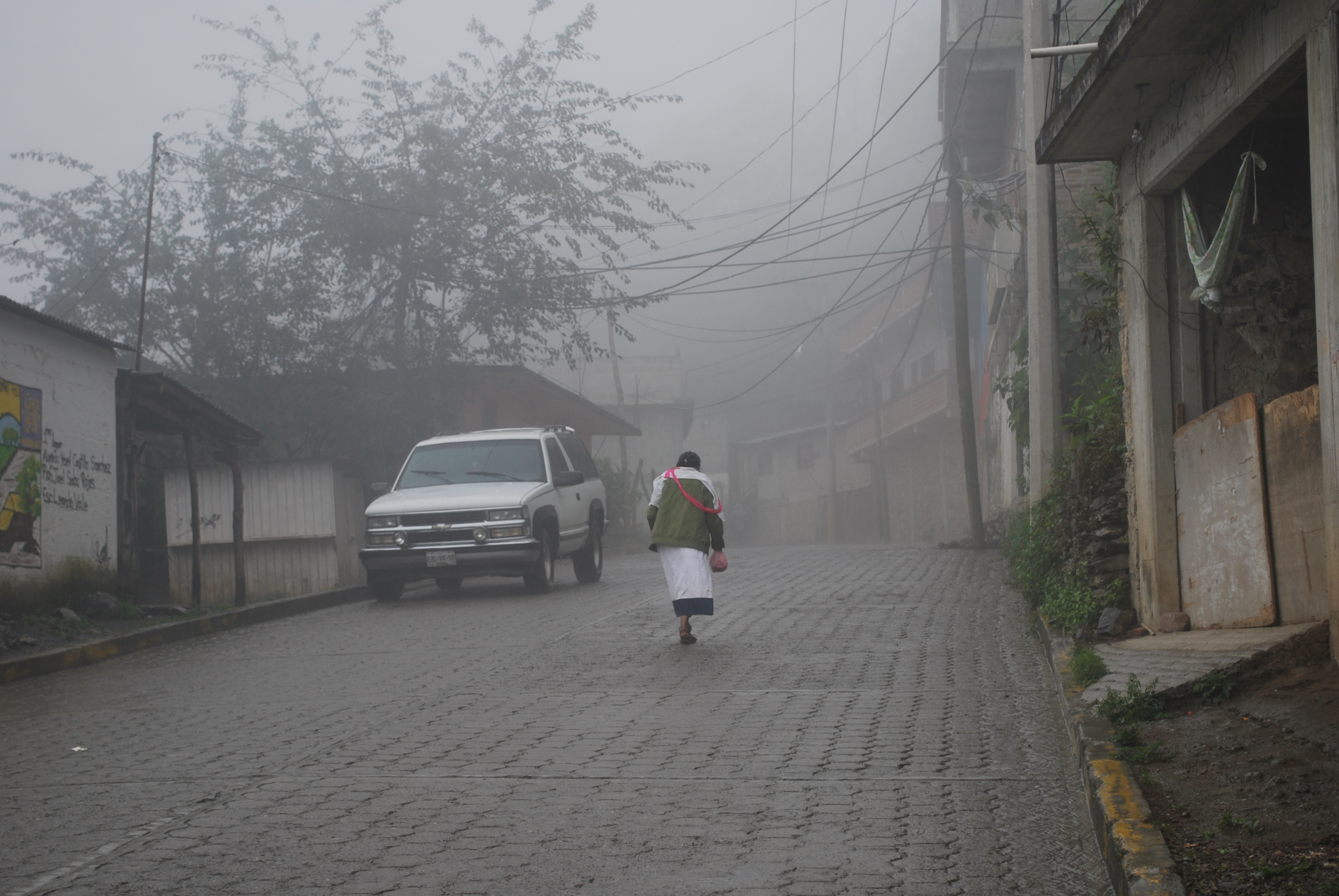
- Woman walking on street in town on foggy day

- Location in Mexico
- Coordinates: 20°18′02″N 98°09′45″W
- Country: Mexico
- State: Puebla
- Municipality: Pahuatlán
- Time zone: UTC-6 (CST)
- Postal code (of seat): 73110

San Pablito is a small town located on the side of the Guajalote Mountain in the Sierra Norte de Puebla mountain region in central east Mexico. It belongs to the Pahuatlán municipality of the state of Puebla. Culturally it is dominated by the Otomi although it is part of the La Huasteca region.

San Pablito is best known for the commercial production of a bark paper called amate as a handcraft. This paper is mostly sold to Nahua painters in Guerrero, but it is also sold nationally and internationally on its own. The paper is made much the way it was before the arrival of the Spanish. Originally, it was made only by the area's shamans for ritual purpose but today commercial production is mostly done by the town's women and children as many men have left to work in the United States.

== The town ==
San Pablito is one of the towns belonging to the Pahuatlán municipality, located in the Sierra Norte region of the state of Puebla in eastern Mexico. The area is rugged mountain terrain which was relatively inaccessible until recent decades. Before the current vehicular road was built in 1978 (paved in the mid-1990s), the only way to reach the community was a steep path by foot or horse.

While the valley area is in a cultural region called La Huasteca, San Pablito and the other villages on its side of the San Marcos River are Otomi territory. These Otomi are related to those in the Mezquital Valley in Hidalgo and among a number of indigenous ethnicities which migrated here from other parts of Mexico. The Otomi name for the town is Bité or Nvite, which means “at the bottom of the hill.”

Traditional dress for women consists of a skirt decorated with stripes and a cotton blouse with short sleeves and a square neckline which is embroidered in bright colors. This embroidery often has images of humans and animals done in cross-stitch or with beads. A poncho-like garment called a quezquémetl is worn over the blouse, which is usually white with a wide purple or red trim. If it is sunny, this garment is then usually folded to be worn on the head. Traditional dress for men consists of pants and a shirt in plain cotton with a white cotton belt, with a macramé fringe and bright colored embroidery. A heavier shirt in black or blue with white stripes may be worn over this along with an ixtle fiber bag and huarache sandals. A local type of basket which is still in use is called a tancolote, which has a frame of tree branches.

Much of the natural vegetation of the valley is lost, but the town is surrounded by orange groves and coffee plantations. These grow in the area's hot, wet climate, strongly affected by warm air masses coming in from the Gulf of Mexico. These air masses produce many days with fog along with rain.

Traditionally subsistence consisted of farming with hunting and gathering. The first external commerce was the growing of coffee beans, with this and latter selling of various handcrafts done through intermediaries to the outside world. One reason for this was that few in the town spoke Spanish. Today, amate paper production is the main economic activity. On days when the townspeople, mostly women, are making it, the rhythmic pounding of stones fills the air. Another important craft is called “chaquira,” intricate beadwork based on what has been done on the traditional blouses of women. It has been adapted to decorate purses and to create jewelry. Women also embroider cotton skirts with figures of horses, people and eagles, not for their own use but rather for sale to tourists.

The production of amate paper has been commercially successful, with sales mostly outside the Sierra Norte region, which has given the town economic and political clout up to the state and federal levels. It is the only town in the municipality, aside from the seat, to have private telephone service, a high school and computers. Much of this was negotiated with federal and state agencies rather than municipal authorities.

Despite the commercial success of the town's crafts, many men, mostly of the younger generations, migrate out of the area, generally to North Carolina in the United States at least temporarily to work. This has left the town mostly populated by women and children, who produce the amate paper and other crafts.

== History ==
San Pablito is one of a number of Otomi-dominated towns in the Pahuatlán Valley in the north of Puebla. These Otomi are one of two main groups of the ethnicity in Mexico, with the other concentrated in the Mezquital Valley in Hidalgo. The Otomi are thought to have migrated here from the Toluca Valley starting around 800 CE, pushed out by other groups, including the Nahuas, over the centuries. The Aztecs conquered the area in the late 15th century, but the Otomi here managed to keep much of their political and economic independence.

The isolation of the rugged mountains also proved to protect much of the Otomi culture here after the Spanish conquest of the Aztec Empire. The Otomi originally allied with the Spanish against the Aztecs but soon rebelled against Spanish rule. The harsh terrain made enforcement of Spanish law and imposition of Spanish culture and economics difficult. As the valley did not hold much mineral wealth, most Spanish did not settle there. The establishment of formal control and parish churches came relatively late. The Otomi of the area resisted evangelization strongly and have kept a large number of indigenous beliefs to this day, especially the use of paper for ceremonies. However, most Otomi of the area have religious beliefs which are a blend of the indigenous and Catholicism.

Life in San Pablito traditionally revolved around agriculture and the gathering of products from the mountains. The first change to this was the introduction of coffee plantations. However, the largest change to the town's economy came in the 20th century with the commercialization of amate paper. It is not known whether the Otomi began commercializing the paper on their own with connections with the Nahua painters made later, or whether the commercialization came as a result of Nahua interest in it. Paper cutouts were sold in tourist markets in Mexico City along with other Otomi crafts. It is known that Otomi and Nahua craftsmen connected in these markets in Mexico City. The area's religious practices attracted researchers around the same time, and the first Otomi bark paper sold to foreigners were in the form of cutouts by the shamans, sold to researchers such as Frederick Starr and Bodil Christensen who wrote about the manufacture and use of the paper. However, by this time the use of amate paper for ritual had been on the decline, replaced in part by the use of industrial paper. Its disappearance was likely halted by the commercialization with most of the demand coming from outside the Puebla area.

The selling of amate paper outside of the municipality has given the town political and economic clout in the municipality of Pahuatlán. Because of the community's economic and political skills, it is the only community (aside from the seat) with a high school, computers, and private telephone service. Much of the town's political clout is with state and federal authorities.

In 1999, a storm knocked out the only then-dirt road connecting the community with the municipal seat of Pahuatlán. The municipality offered help in the way of supplies delivered by helicopter but then only tried to deliver half of what was promised. San Pablito refused the delivery and instead communicated with outside contacts which then delivered the needed food and supplies. In this way, the community indicated its independence from municipal authorities.

The Otomi through San Pablito have gained political power locally as well. The first attempt by an Otomi to gain a municipal political seat was in 1998, but the ruling mestizo class managed to have this candidate lose by only twenty votes. In 1999, authorities in indigenous communities in the municipality banded together to oppose municipal authorities by supporting certain candidates in mass. They also work to pressure the municipality internally and externally through contacts at the state and federal level. In 2001, an Otomi leader of San Pablito won elections for municipal president, a first in the Sierra Norte.

Despite the success of amate paper for San Pablito, many of the men here migrate to find work at least temporarily, a trend that began in the 1980s. Most head to North Carolina in the United States.

== Religious tradition ==
In part because of its isolation, the Otomi of San Pablito and the surrounding areas have managed to keep a large part of their indigenous cultural heritage, especially religious beliefs. While they venerate Catholic figures such as Saint Paul and the Virgin of Guadalupe, they also pay homage to deities of the mountains, sun, moon, water, fire and earth. They also believe in evil spirits. There is significant animism in the sense that entities such as mountains, seeds, fresh water springs and other objects of nature have life force.

One central component of religious life here revolves around shamans, locally called badi. These act as mediators between humans and higher beings. Rituals performed by shamans are meant to create communication with these beings and can be for the benefit of the community as a whole or for an individual. This shamanism has given the Otomi, especially in San Pablito, a reputation for magic and sorcery among their neighbors. These rituals have traditionally been related to agriculture among other things, but as the economy has shifted, most rituals relate to health as well as protection and cleansing, especially of those heading to and from the United States. Traditional medicine consists of two types of sicknesses, “good” and “bad,” with the first being cured with herbs or modern medicine. The second is considered to be spiritual in nature and cured by shamanic rituals to get rid of bad spirits and/or create harmony between the sick person and the universe. San Pablito's best known shaman is Alfonso Garcia.

One hallmark of Otomi magical practices is the use of paper cut into forms, along with more common elements such as offerings of food and tobacco. The origins of using the paper cutouts is not known as there are no pre-Hispanic or colonial sources that document the practice, except for a mention around the 1600s of the use of paper strips for ceremonies. The act of cutting the paper gives the shaman a connection with the entity and includes images of various gods, “super humans,” seeds and more. Figures representing evil are generally cut wearing shoes, as the Europeans and mestizos do. Those representing good are barefoot, like most indigenous peoples.

The paper is mostly seen as neutral, gaining power as it is cut. However, in general white paper is considered to have positive connotations and dark to have negative. While amate paper is the most traditional, commercially made paper is also used. Shamans from other Otomi villages preferred to use San Pablito-produced paper because it was believed to be more powerful. The ability to use industrial paper meant that the making of amate was on the decline in the mid-20th century. Otomi rituals have made a comeback, and, as a consequence, so has interest in amate as a commercial product, which has helped to save it.

Paper cutting rituals may be part of community observances. One of the main celebrations is the new year, now celebrated on January 1, as it represents renewal of the cosmos. On this day, ceremonies often take place in caves with cutouts as offerings along with food items. Day of the Dead is important in the town, like the rest of Mexico. It is celebrated here from October 31 to November 2 with a day dedicated to children, adults and saints respectively. October 31, which is for children, is then subdivided into those who died without eating corn and those who had eaten corn but not had sexual relations. The Fiesta del Pueblo (Town Festival) begins a week after Holy Week ends and lasts for fifteen days. The event honors twelve saints with each having its own day. The most important day is the first Thursday which honors the Holy Trinity, followed by that of Saint Paul, the patron of the town.

== Amate paper production ==
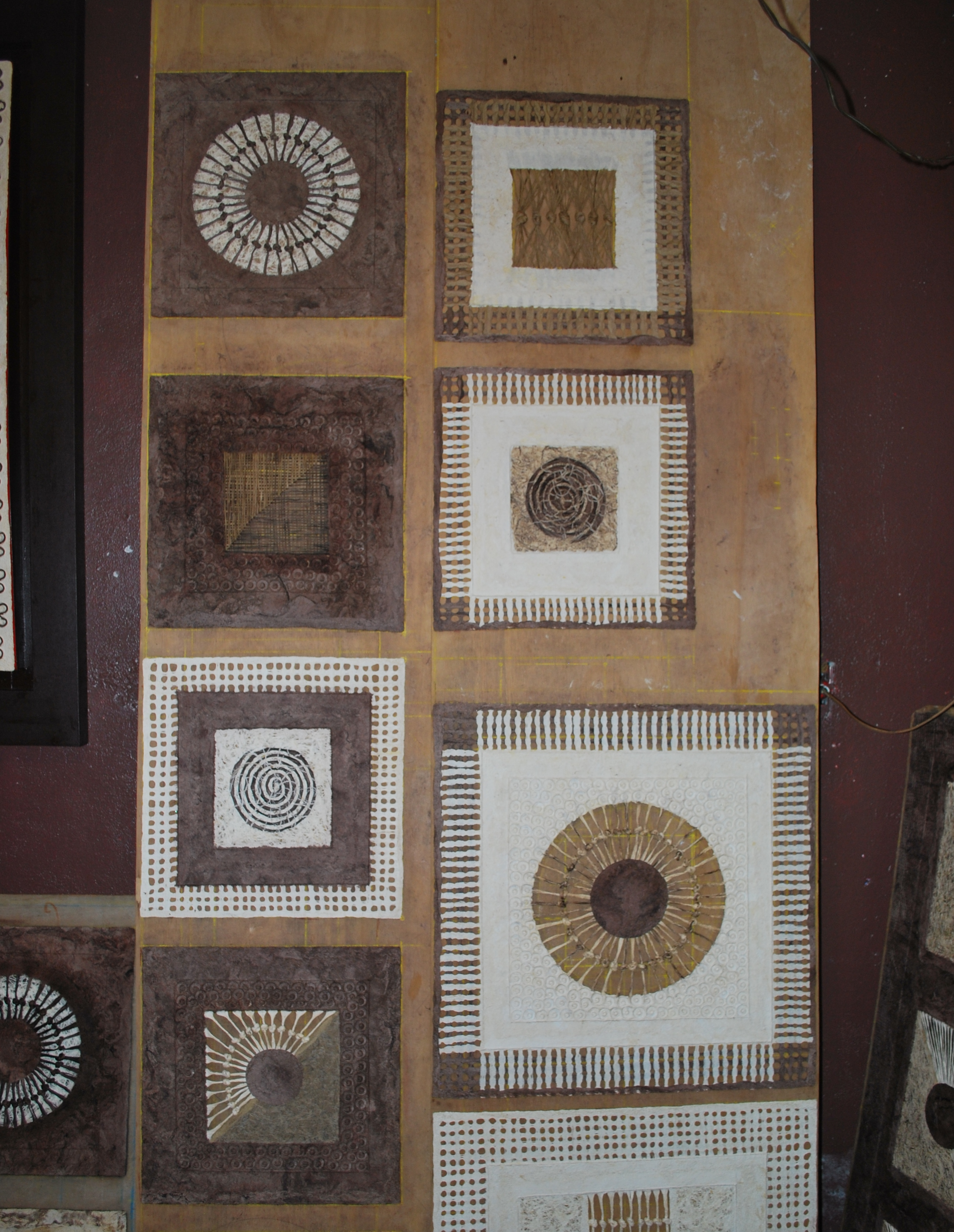
Examples of amate paper wall hangings at the gallery-museum of the town

While amate is produced in small quantities elsewhere in Mexico, San Pablito is the only commercial producer of the paper and its manufacture is now the main economic activity. About 6,000 Otomis in and around San Pablito manufacture the paper full- or part-time.

As in other parts of Mexico, the manufacture of this paper was originally for ceremonial use, and restricted to shamans. For this reason, the paper is also locally known as “papel de brujos” (witches’ paper). Manufacture of the paper is no longer restricted to shamans because of commercialization, but ritualistic use of it in San Pablito and other Otomi communities continues and is still in the purview of the shamans. Particularly large ficus trees used for paper are marked as sacred with candles and cutouts.

The commercialization of the paper began in the mid-20th century. The Otomi began selling handcrafts in Mexico City in the late 1950s. Sale of the paper as a handcraft is traced as far back as the 1960s, but its exact introduction to the market is not clear. However, its recognition as an important craft came when it became tied to paintings done by the Nahuas from the state of Guerrero, who adopted styles from their ceramics to the new medium. At first, nearly all of the San Pablito amate production was bought by the Nahuas, leading to a standard 40 by 60 cm paper sheet. Then the federal government intervened, mostly through FONART, at first to promote the craft internationally at the 1968 Olympic Games and later as the main buyer of the paper to keep Nahua painters supplied.

While the production of 40 by 60 cm paper remains economically important, the amate production of the San Pablito has since diversified. New products include envelopes, bookmarks, cutout figures, and booklets, as well as sheets in a variety of colors, textures and sizes up to 1.20 by 2.40 meters. There are also varieties decorated with dried flowers and leaves. In addition to traditional Nahua customers, amate paper is now sold to industries who use it to produce other end products such as lampshades, furniture covers, wallpaper and parquet flooring. The success of amate paper commercialization has caused the population here to forego most other economic activities such as agriculture and even other handcrafts such as pottery and weaving.

Because most working-age men have left San Pablito, most of the manufacture of the paper is done by women and children. The town's craftsmen are dependent upon the bark supply provided by those in surrounding towns; this is mostly done by men, who cover an area of about 1,500km2 in the Sierra Norte to find the appropriate bark. The manufacturing process varies slightly from artisan to artisan, but its basic steps are to soak the bark to soften it, pound the fibers together into a sheet and then lay the sheets out in the sun to dry.

Most paper has been manufactured at the household level but this has changed somewhat. There are two types of production units in the town. The first consists of households of up to five members, with production varying greatly during the year depending on other economic activities and/or means to produce the paper. The other type is primarily devoted to producing paper, with family members often involved in bark collection and commercialization of end products along with producing the paper itself. In most cases, the work goes on in the home. The appearance of workshops for paper-making first started to appear in the 1990s. Paper manufacture is dependent on the weather, with May through July being the driest months of the region and therefore the most suitable. Less paper is produced December through February because of the weather. Another factor is religious festivals such as Holy Week and Day of the Dead in which paper demand peaks. On days that are appropriate for paper-making, work goes from sunrise to sunset to take advantage of the weather.

Most amate work is done in standard sizes with few recognized artisans, mostly because it has mostly been commercialized as the base for Nahua paintings. This has been changing with bark paper pieces winning awards such as the National Popular Art Prize and the UNESCO Handicraft Prize. This has led to more innovations being made in amate production. Some artisans have experimented with sizes, shapes, and elaborate designs, and there have been amate exhibits in the Smithsonian Institution and the London Museum of Archeology. One of these innovations is large, poster-sized cutouts, usually rich in decoration with figures such as suns, flowers and birds framed by friezes. In some, different types of bark are used. The booklets are made from a meter-long sheet of paper which are folded to resemble Aztec codices. Shamans no longer sell individual cutouts but rather small books with the cutouts of gods glued inside. Cutouts with no religious theme have been explored as well.(binn105) These designs include those made for Valentine's Day and those imitating the designs of Otomi embroidery and beadwork.

About seventy percent of amate makers sell to wholesalers, with only the biggest manufactures having their own outside contracts. These larger concerns also produce nearly all of the output outside of the standard 60 by 40 cm sheet. Each standard sheet costs about four pesos to make. High-quality paper by known artisans can sell for as high as USD $500 on the international market. The dependence on local wholesalers led to socio-economic stratification in the town, with the wholesalers receiving more profit off the paper than the producers. It is estimated that today about fifty percent of production ultimately goes to Nahua painters, with about seventy percent of the resulting paintings sold in Mexico. Amate paper sold internationally is generally used for arts, crafts, stationery and home décor.

The sale of amate paper has connected this small town to the outside world. Although the craftspeople are not supported by the local government, they have strong contacts with state and federal authorities. The paper manufacture affects the economy of the villages around San Pablito, which supply it with bark and fuel wood. The paper production has attracted some tourism as well as purchasers from various states in Mexico and from abroad. However, the town carefully guards the details about how the paper is made, from other inhabitants of the Sierra Norte and from foreigners. Vendors seen to be trying to learn how to make the paper have been kicked out of town, and attempts by Japanese researchers looking to document the process have been rejected.

The success of amate paper commercialization has led to environmental issues in the San Pablito area and farther away. It is getting harder to find bark due to the over-stripping of trees and the loss of forests to agriculture and development. There have been attempts to cultivate the tree species currently used for paper-making, but without success. Currently, there are attempts to reforest the area with a similar species which grows to maturity faster. The use of caustic soda and industrial dyes in the process of making amate has caused problems with pollution, especially of the San Marcos River, whose waters then pollute the Cazones River.

== Bibliography ==
- Rosaura Citlalli López Binnqüist (2003). The endurance of Mexican amate paper: Exploring additional dimensions to the sustainable development concept (PDF) (PhD thesis). University of Twente, Enschede, Netherlands. Docket 9036519004.
