= Nicolás de Jesús =

- Born: December 6, 1960 (age 65); Ameyaltepec, Guerrero, Mexico
- Known for: Bark paper painting, etching, printmaking
- Notable work: Dia de los Muertos series
- Style: Amate art, political and cultural themes
- Movement: Mexican folk art

Nicolas de Jesus (born December 6, 1960) is a Mexican artist from the Nahua region of Guerrero, Mexico. His work carries themes of Mexican rural life as well as politics and world events. The celebration Dia de los Muertos is a common subject in his art.

Nicolás de Jesús developed his art through his parents and his community of Ameyaltepec. There painting on bark paper is the preferred medium of expression of local traditions. His work reflects the spectrum of his experiences from his origins in a traditional Mexican Village to the complex problems of Mexican immigrants in the United States and his concern for preserving his cultural identity. By the time the art activist Felipe Ehrenberg started to teach Nicolás etching and other printing techniques, the young artist had already adopted the traditional amate composition with many whimsical and detailed characters and a great empty space atop the page to suggest a great distance. The reoccurring theme in Amayaltepec amates is everyday village life—its celebrations and beliefs. After moving to Chicago in the 1980s, de Jesús additionally started to depict urban life in U.S. barrios in the same manner.
