= Xalitla =

Scientific classification
- Domain: Eukaryota
- Kingdom: Animalia
- Phylum: Arthropoda
- Class: Insecta
- Order: Coleoptera
- Suborder: Polyphaga
- Infraorder: Cucujiformia
- Family: Cerambycidae
- Genus: Xalitla; Lane, 1959

Genus of beetles

Xalitla is a genus of beetles in the family Cerambycidae, containing the following species:

- Xalitla azteca Lane, 1959
- Xalitla genuina Martins, 1970
- Xalitla limoni Santos-Silva & Skillman, 2020
- Xalitla punctatissima Martins, 1970
