= Codex Sierra =

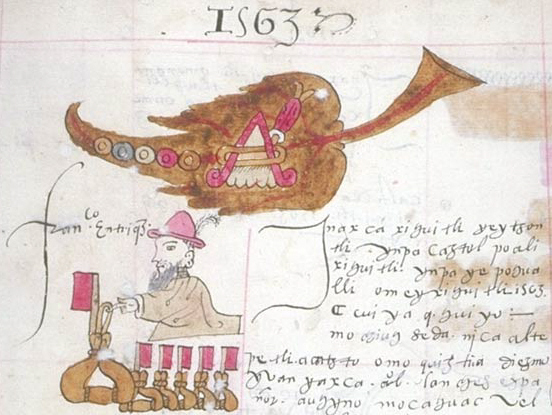
An elaborate year sign in the Codex Sierra. The text begins: Inaxca xihuitli yeytzontli ynpa castolpoali xihuitli ynpa yepohualli omeyxihuitli 1563. ¶ cuiya qhuiyo (At this time, 3×400 years and 15×20 years and 3×20 years and 3 years, 1563. Five Reed.) The Christian year is written in Nahuatl, and the indigenous year in Mixtec (cuiya qhuiyo).

The Codex Sierra is a colonial Mesoamerican account book from Santa Catalina Texupa (in the modern Mexican state of Oaxaca), covering the years from 1550 to 1564. It uses both alphabetic and pictorial modes of writing. Though Texupa is a Mixtec and Chocho community, the text is written in Nahuatl, albeit with some Mixtec words. The pictorial portion likewise uses Mixtec conventions, such as the "A-O" year sign.
