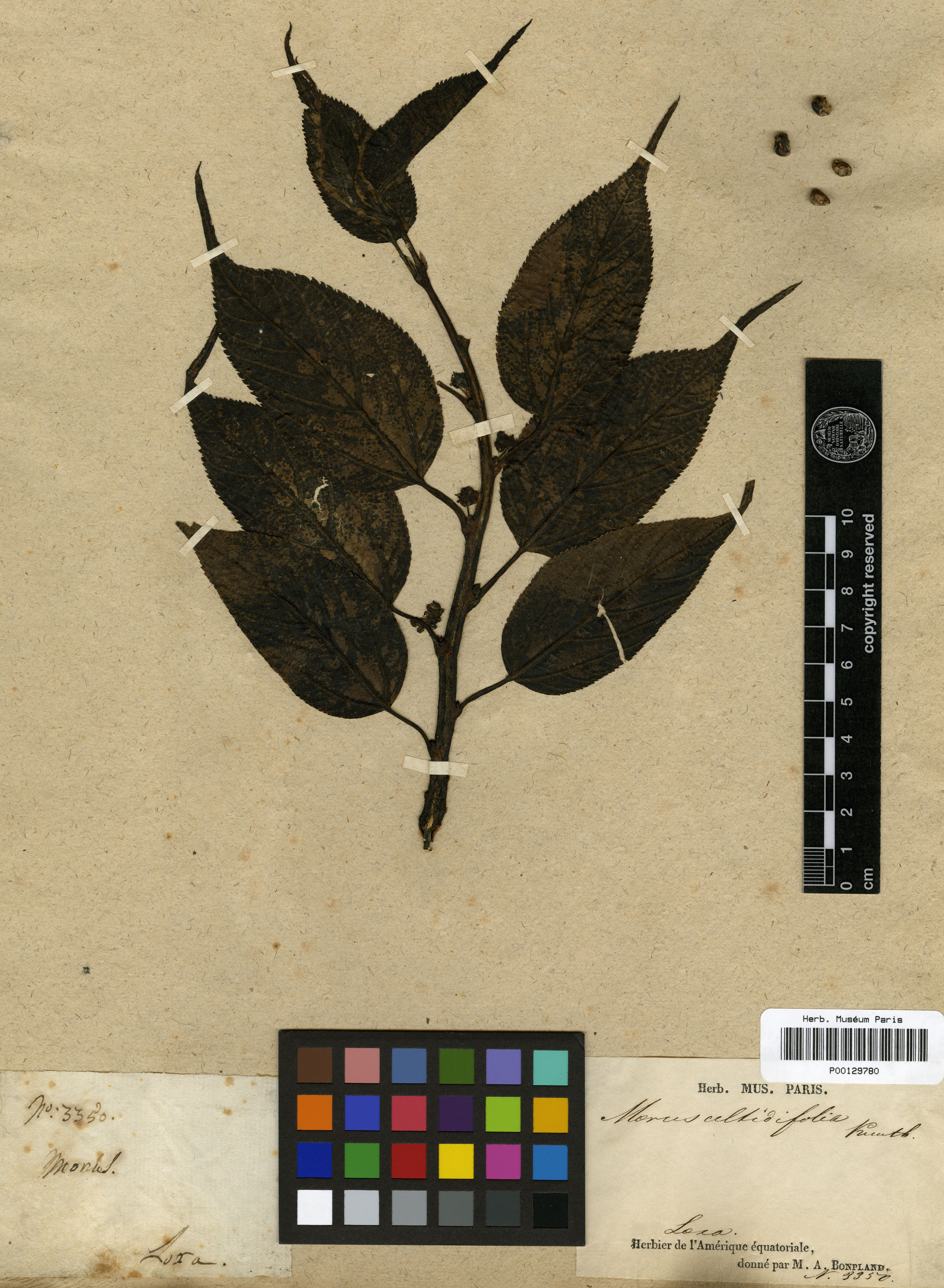

Conservation status
- Least Concern (IUCN 3.1)

Scientific classification
- Kingdom: Plantae
- Clade: Tracheophytes
- Clade: Angiosperms
- Clade: Eudicots
- Clade: Rosids
- Order: Rosales
- Family: Moraceae
- Genus: Morus
- Species: M. celtidifolia

Binomial name
- Morus celtidifolia Kunth (1817)

Synonyms
- Morus albida Greene; Morus arbuscula Greene; Morus betulifolia Greene; Morus canina Greene; Morus corylifolia Kunth; Morus crataegifolia Greene; Morus goldmanii Greene; Morus mexicana Benth.; Morus microphilyra Greene; Morus mollis Rusby; Morus pandurata Greene; Morus vernonii Greene; Morus vitifolia Greene

= Morus celtidifolia =

Species of flowering plant

Morus celtidifolia is a species of flowering in the family Moraceae. It is a shrub or tree native to Mexico, to Guatemala, Honduras, El Salvador, and Costa Rica in Central America, and to Colombia, Ecuador, Peru, and Bolivia in western South America. It grows in lowland and montane tropical and subtropical moist forest.
