= Akseli Gallen-Kallela =

Finnish painter (1865–1931)

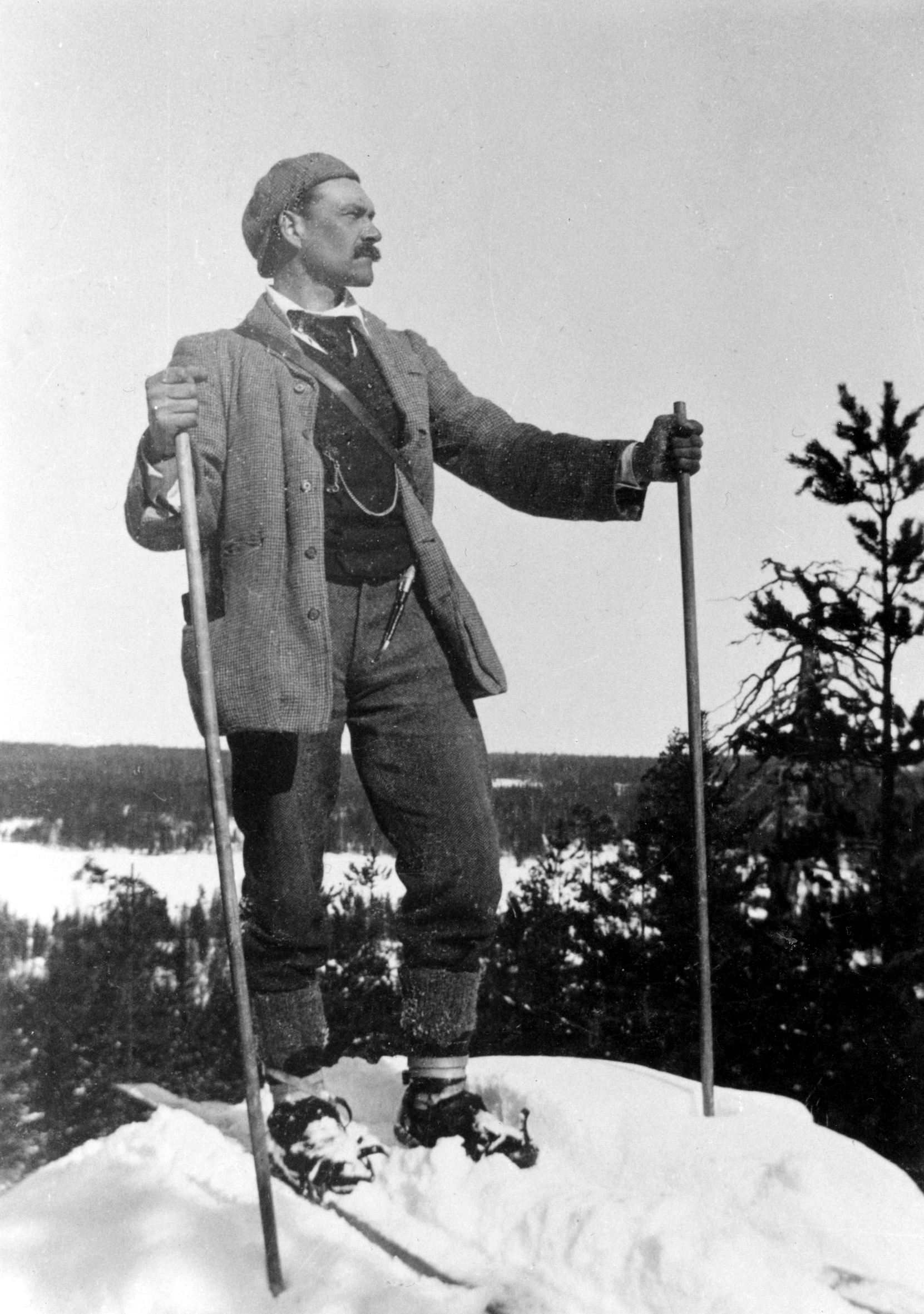
- Born: Axel Waldemar Gallén; 26 April 1865; Pori, Grand Duchy of Finland, Russian Empire
- Died: 7 March 1931 (aged 65); Stockholm, Sweden
- Known for: Illustrations of the Kalevala
- Movement: Romantic nationalism, Realism, Symbolism

Akseli Gallen-Kallela (born Axel Waldemar Gallén; 26 April 1865 – 7 March 1931) was a Finnish painter and a leading figure of Finnish romantic nationalism around the turn of the 20th century. He is considered a pioneer of a distinctly Finnish national art, and his work is regarded as a very important aspect of Finnish national identity.

Gallen-Kallela began his career as a realist painter influenced by Jules Bastien-Lepage before turning, in the 1890s, towards symbolism and a stylised national-romantic idiom. He is best known for his depictions of the Kalevala, the Finnish national epic, including The Defense of the Sampo, Lemminkäinen's Mother and the Aino Triptych, as well as for his illustrations to the Kalevala and to Aleksis Kivi's novel Seven Brothers. He was also active as a graphic artist, designer and fresco painter, executing monumental works for the Finnish pavilion at the Paris World Fair of 1900 and the Jusélius Mausoleum in Pori. He finnicized his name from Gallén to Gallen-Kallela in 1907.

== Life and career ==
=== Early life ===
Gallen-Kallela was born on 26 April 1865, in Pori, to a Swedish-speaking family. His father, Peter Wilhelm Gallén, worked as police chief, lawyer, and bank cashier. His mother was Anna Mathilda Wahlroos, daughter of the sea captain and shipowner Bror Mathias Wahlroos from Pori. The Gallén family traces its origins to Kallela farm in the parish of Lemu, near Turku. Gallen-Kallela was the third of what would become twelve siblings. His mother was an enthusiastic amateur painter who took an active interest in her son's artistic ambitions.

Gallen-Kallela was raised in Tyrvää, where the family had moved in 1867 after his father had bought a farm there. Gallen-Kallela was educated at home until 1876, when he, at the age of 11, was sent to Helsinki to study at the Swedish Normal Lyceum, together with two of his brothers, because his father opposed his ambition to become a painter. He studied concurrently at the evening programme of the Finnish Art Society's drawing school (1878–1881) and at the School of Arts and Crafts (1880–1881). After completing his studies at the lyceum, he began full-time studies at the Finnish Art Society's drawing school in autumn 1881, receiving private instruction from Sigrid August Keinänen (1881–1882) and Albert Edelfelt (1883–1884), and later studied privately under Adolf von Becker (1882–1884).

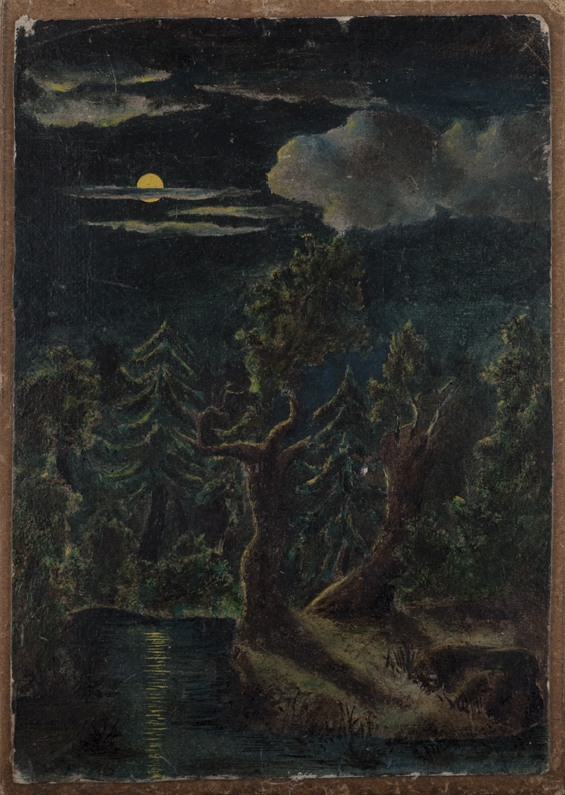
Moonlit Landscape, 1881, his first oil painting

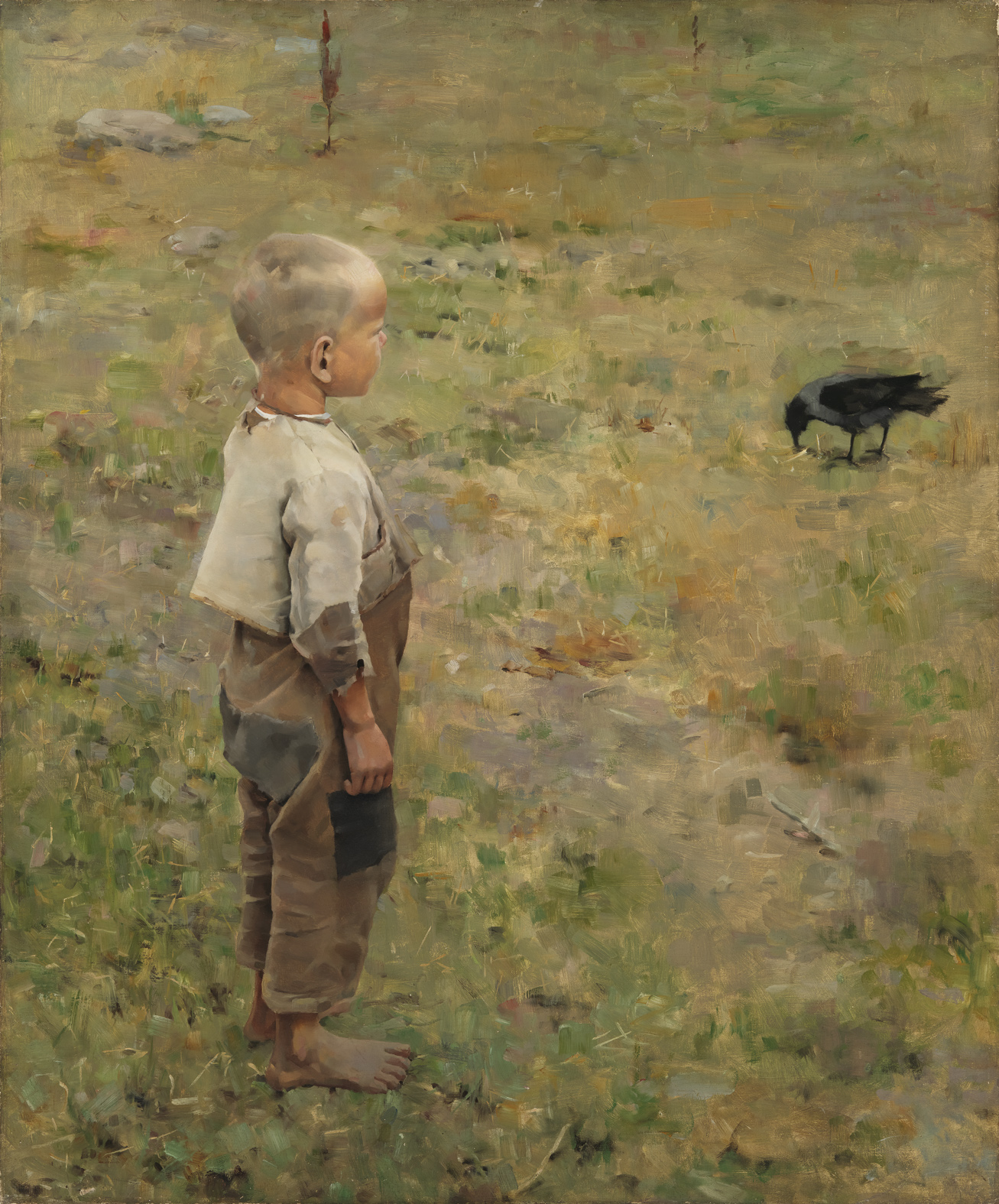
Boy and a Crow, 1884 (fi)

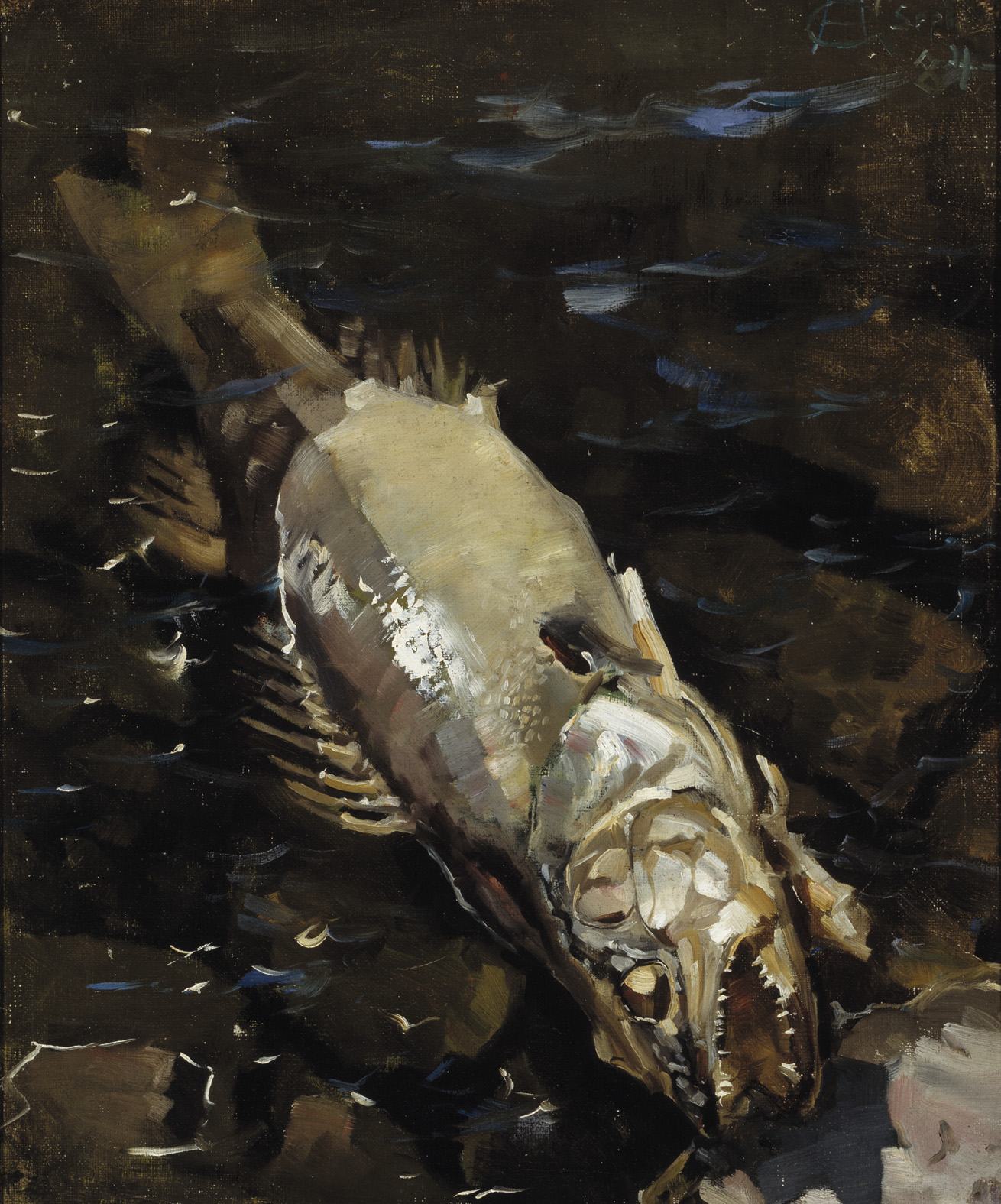
Decaying Sander, 1884 (fi)

=== Paris ===
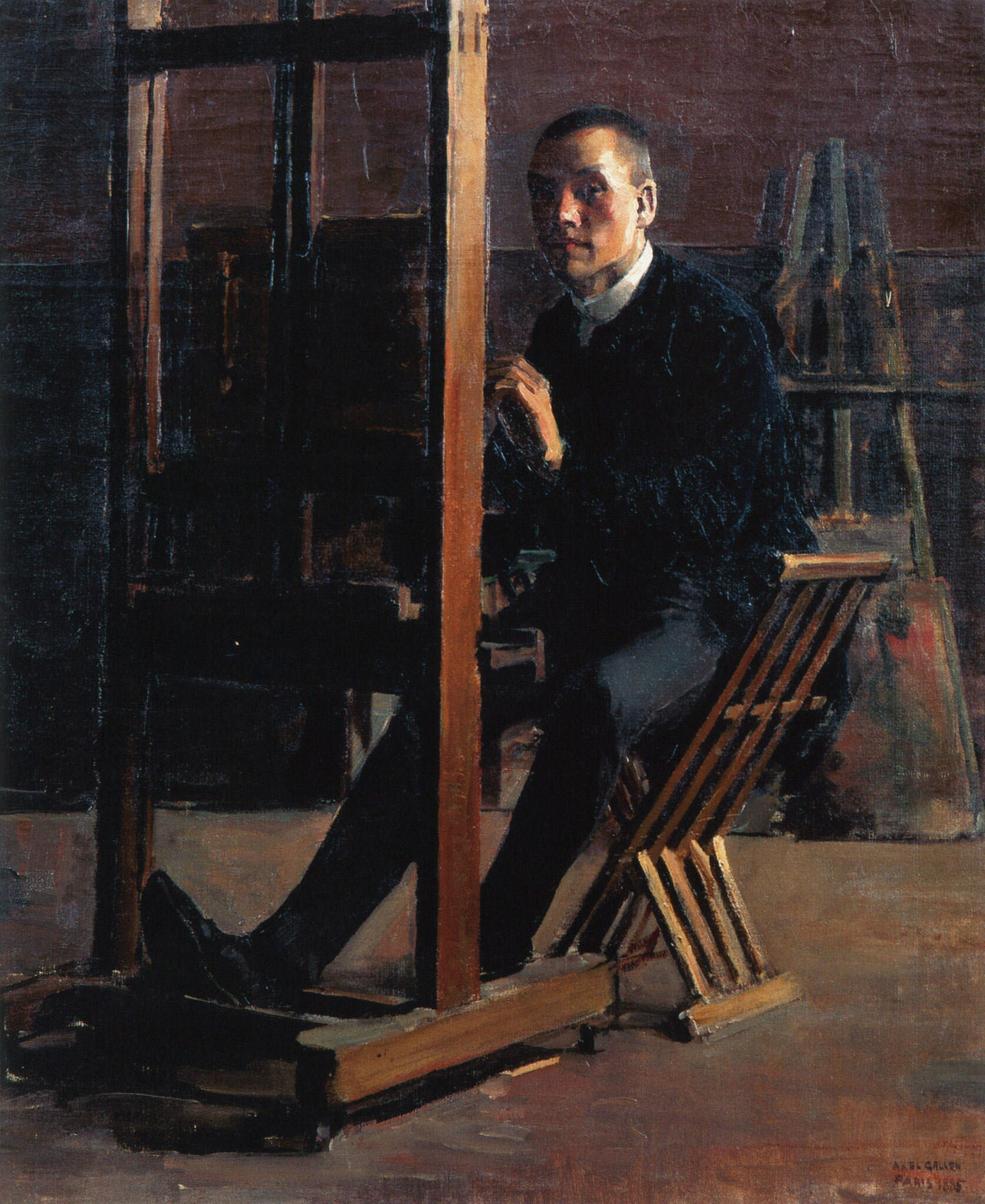
Self-Portrait at the Easel, 1885

In 1884, he moved to Paris, to study at the Académie Julian and the Atelier Cormon until 1889. In Paris he became friends with the Finnish painter Albert Edelfelt, the Norwegian painter Carl Dørnberger, and the Swedish writer August Strindberg. During this period he traveled back and forth between Finland and Paris.

During his Paris years Gallen-Kallela was strongly influenced by the naturalist plein air painting of Jules Bastien-Lepage, whose memorial exhibition he saw in 1885. His painting Old Woman with a Cat (1885), executed in the southern Finnish coastal village of Salo and completed in Paris, provoked controversy when shown at the Finnish Art Society exhibition in 1886: conservative critics rejected the work for its perceived ugliness, while more progressive voices praised its uncompromising realism. The painting marked a breakthrough for a new realist tradition in Finnish art.

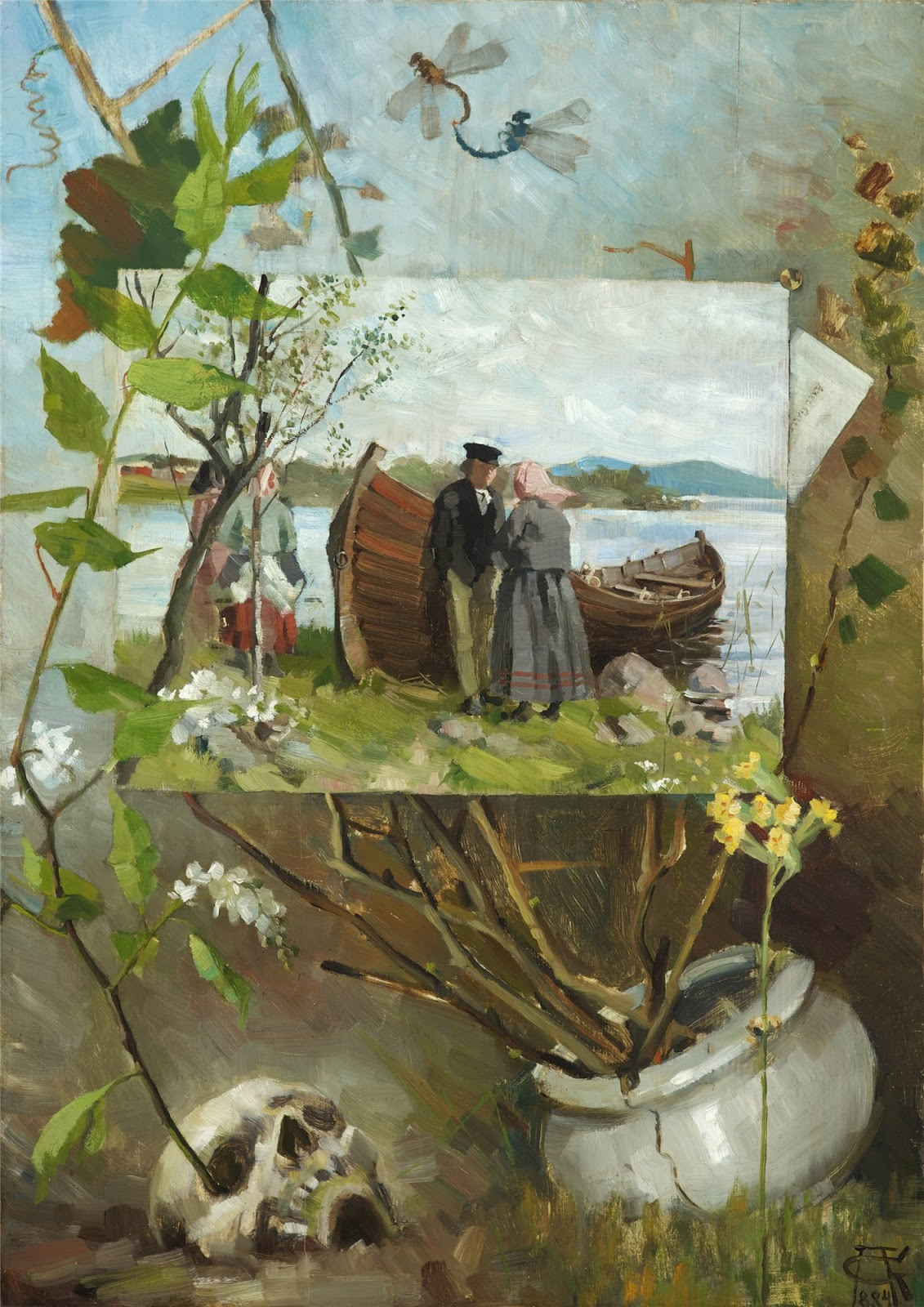
Life and Death, 1884

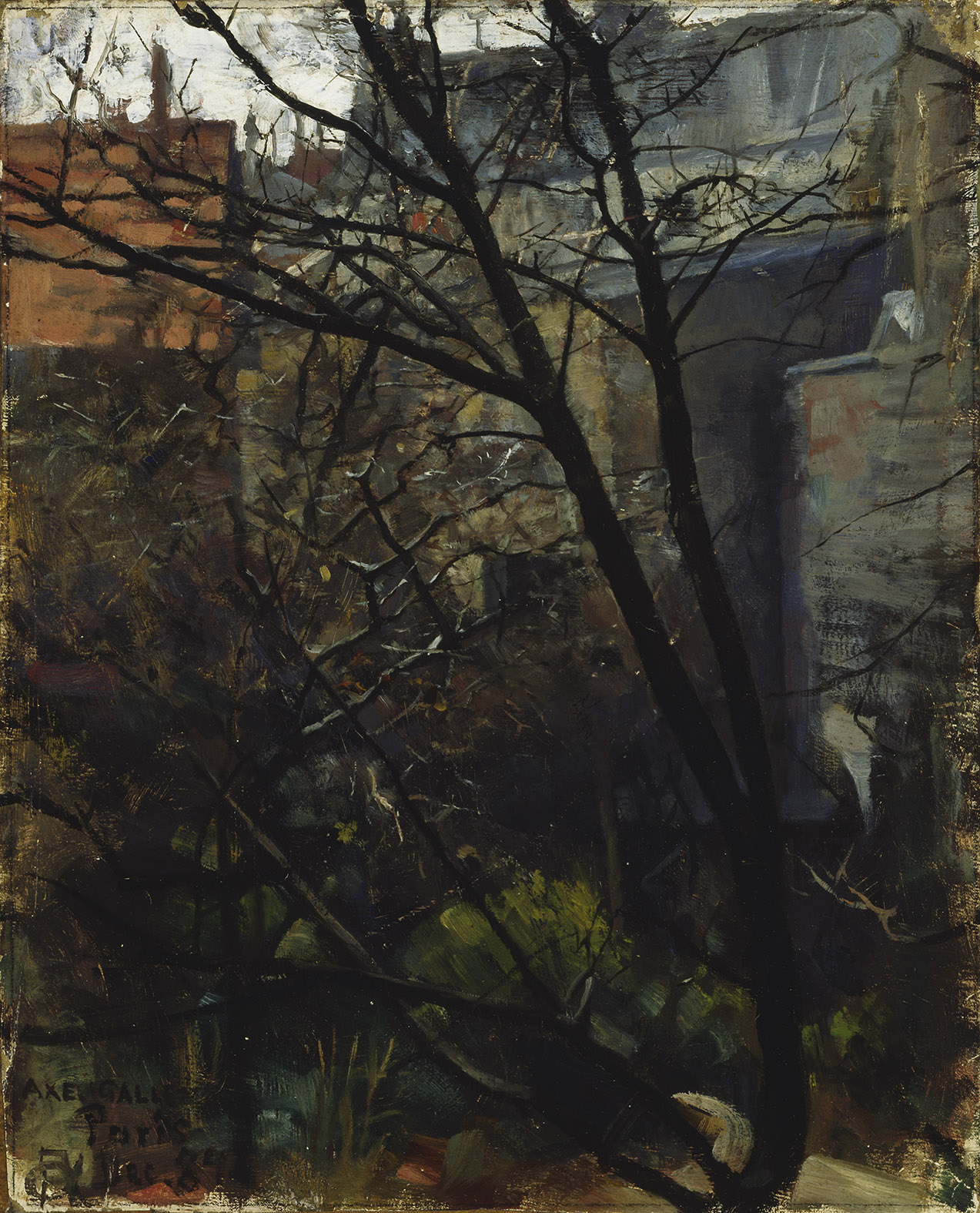
Parisian Backyard, 1884

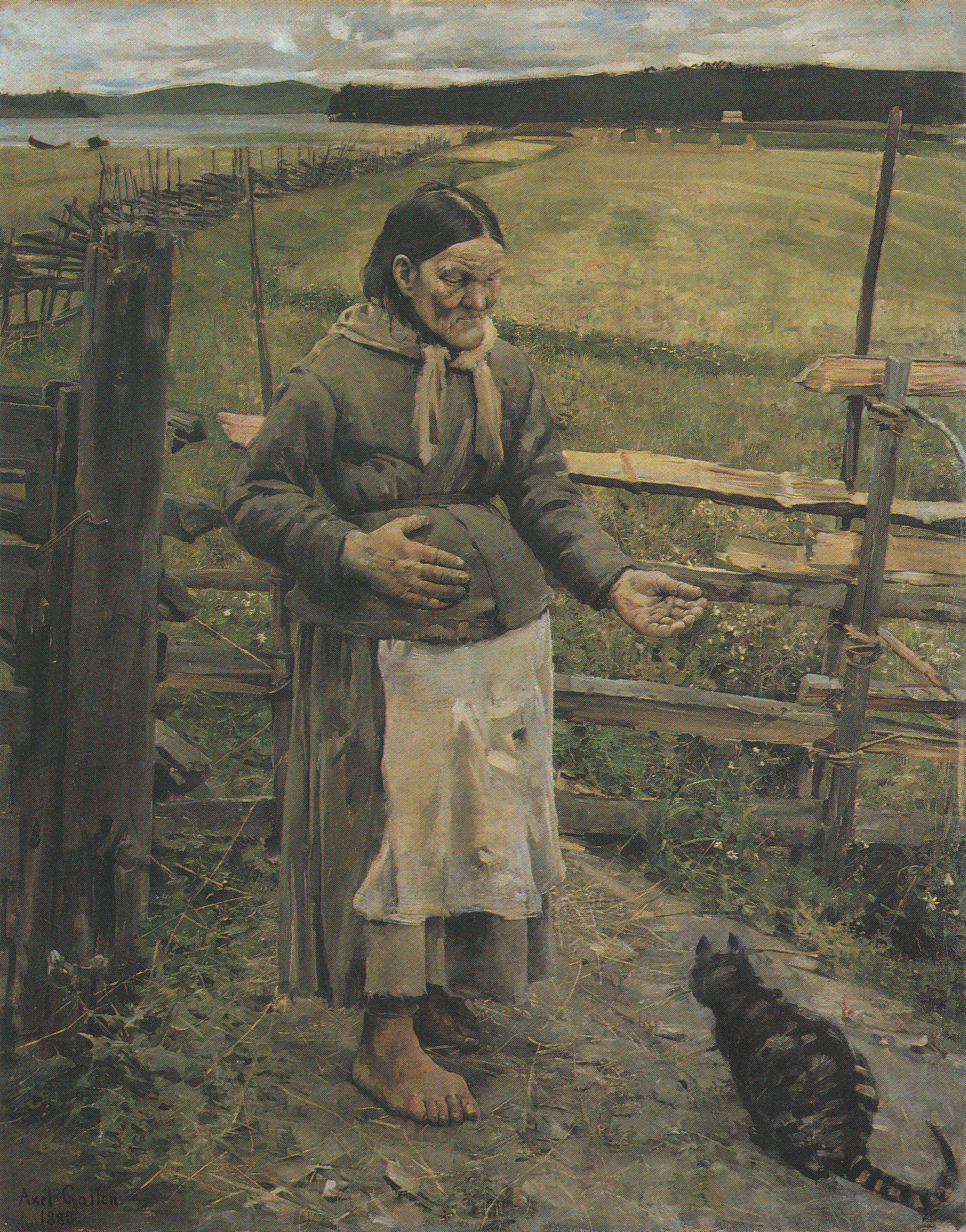
Old Woman with a Cat, 1885 (fi)

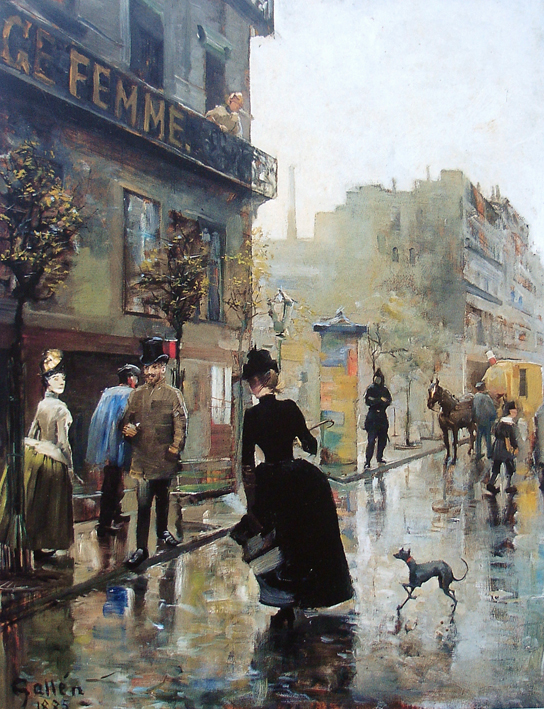
Boulevard in Paris, 1885 (fi)

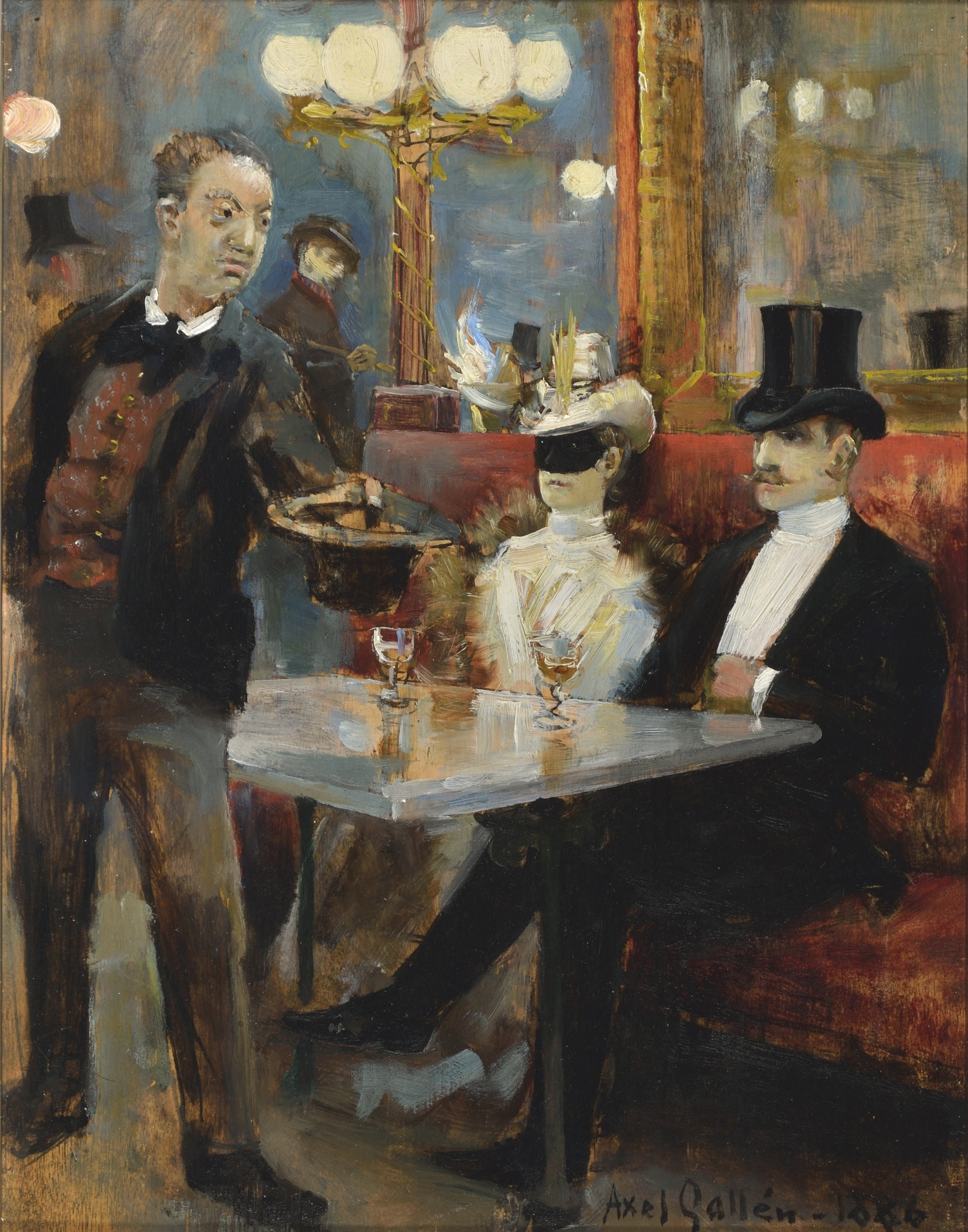
In a Café in Paris, 1886

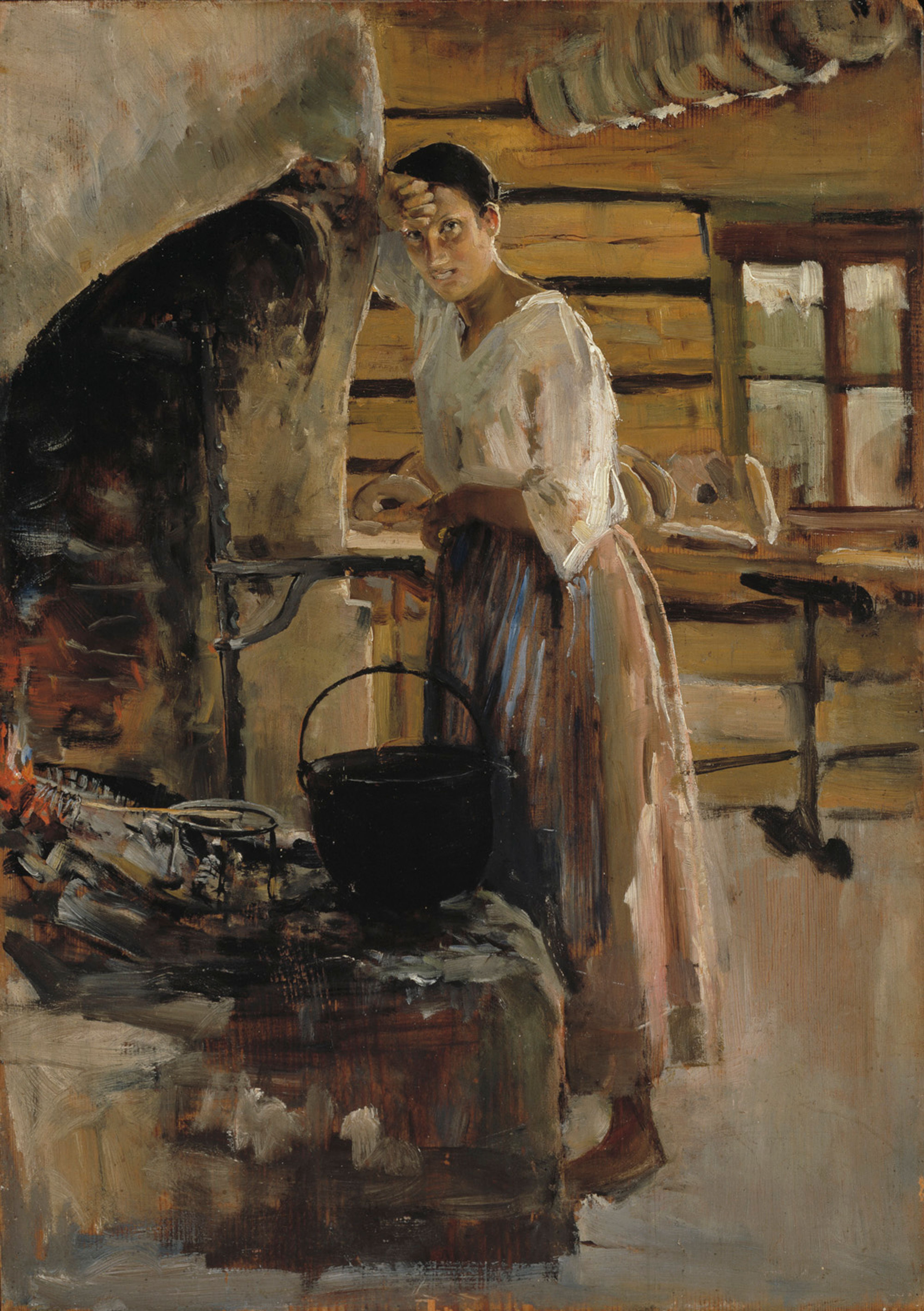
Woman Cooking Whitefish, 1886

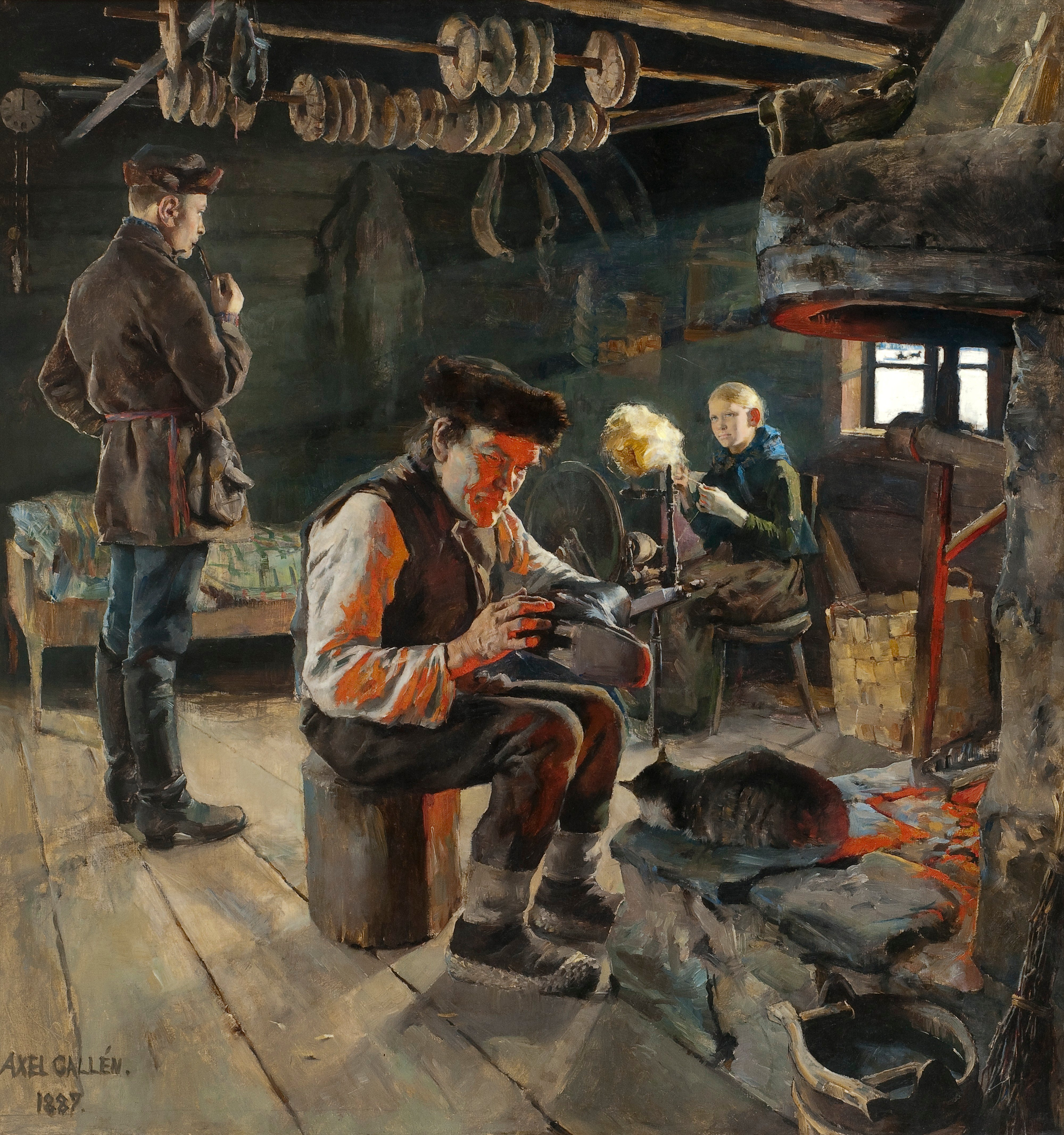
Rustic Life, 1887 (fi)

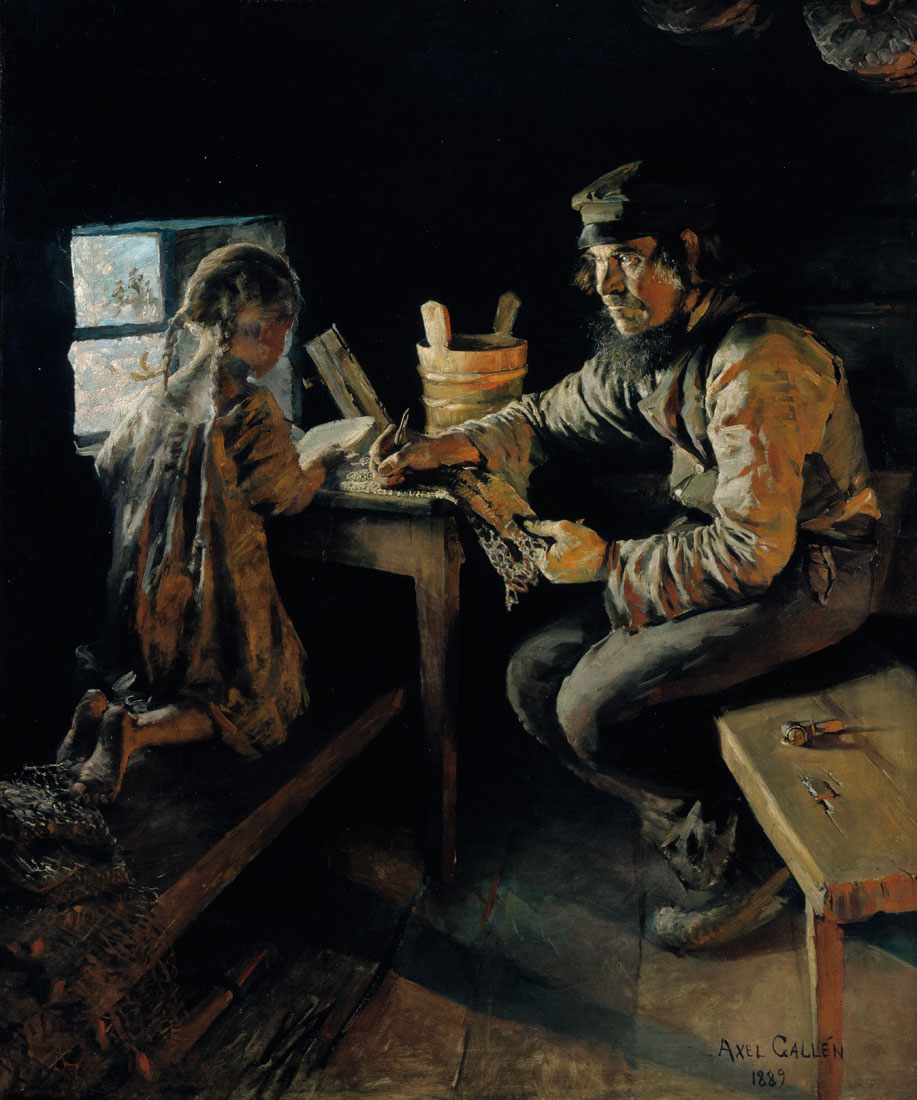
The First Lesson, 1887–1889

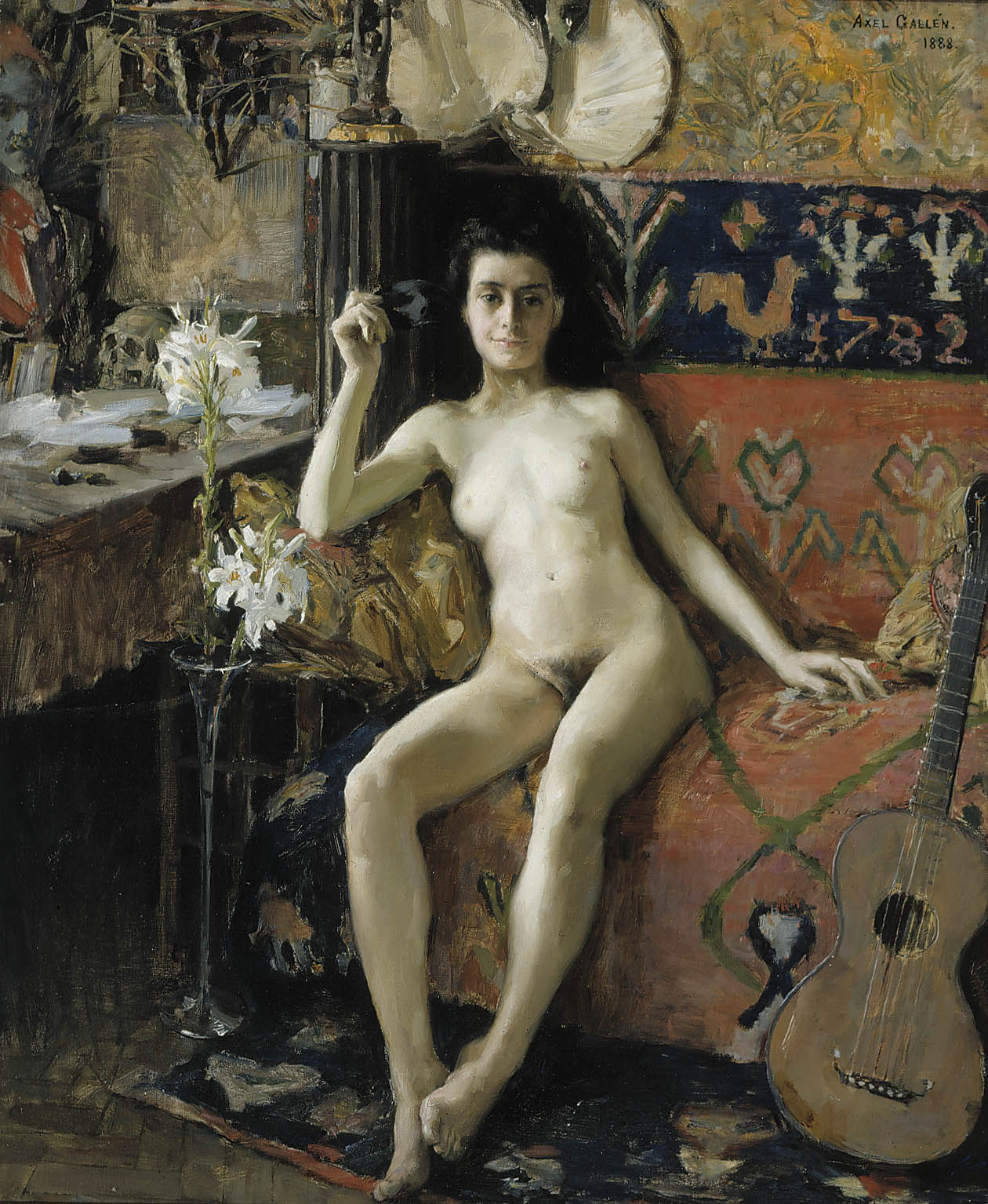
Démasquée, 1888 (fi)

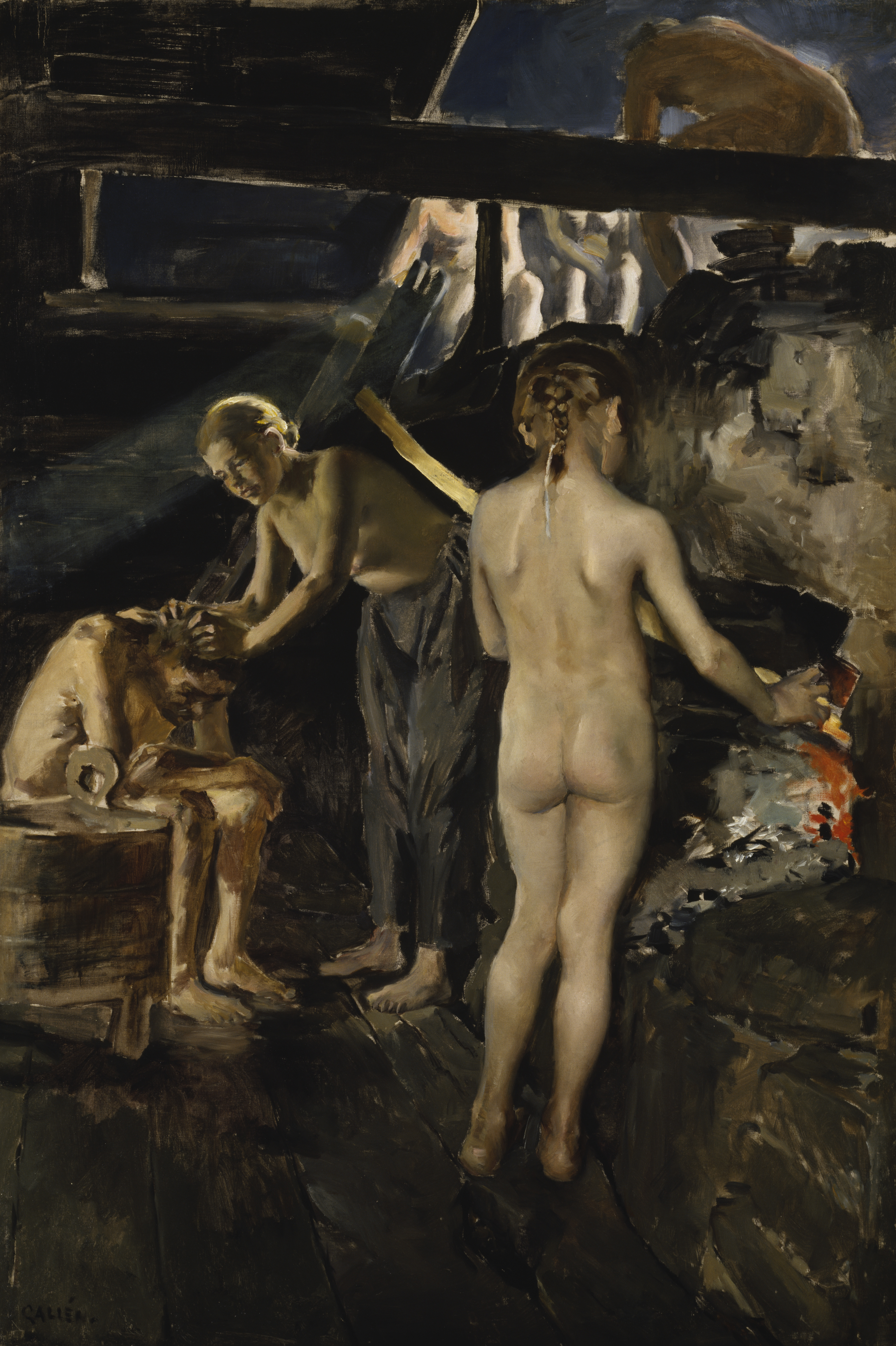
In the Sauna, 1889 (fi)

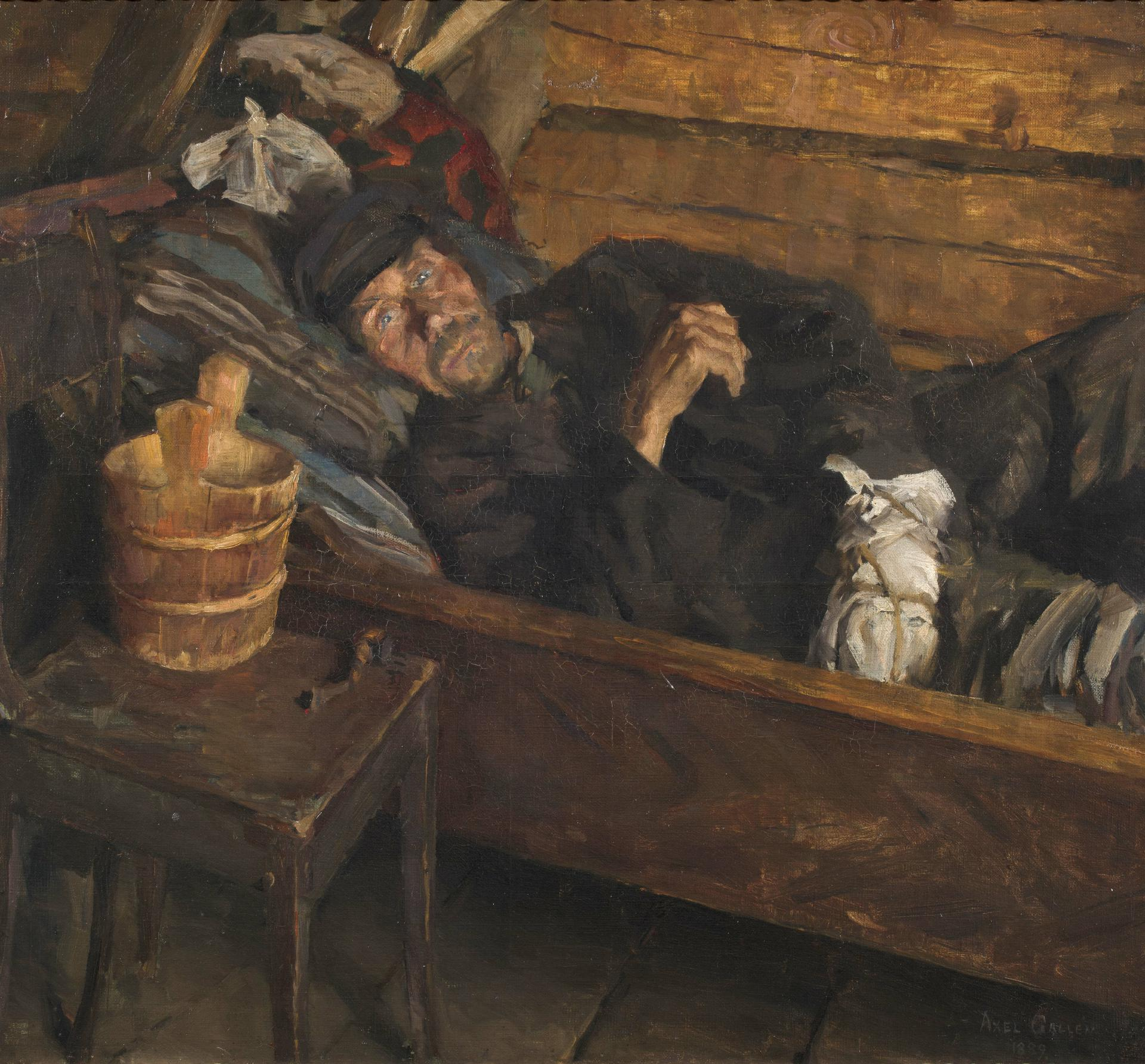
Wound Fever, 1889 (fi)

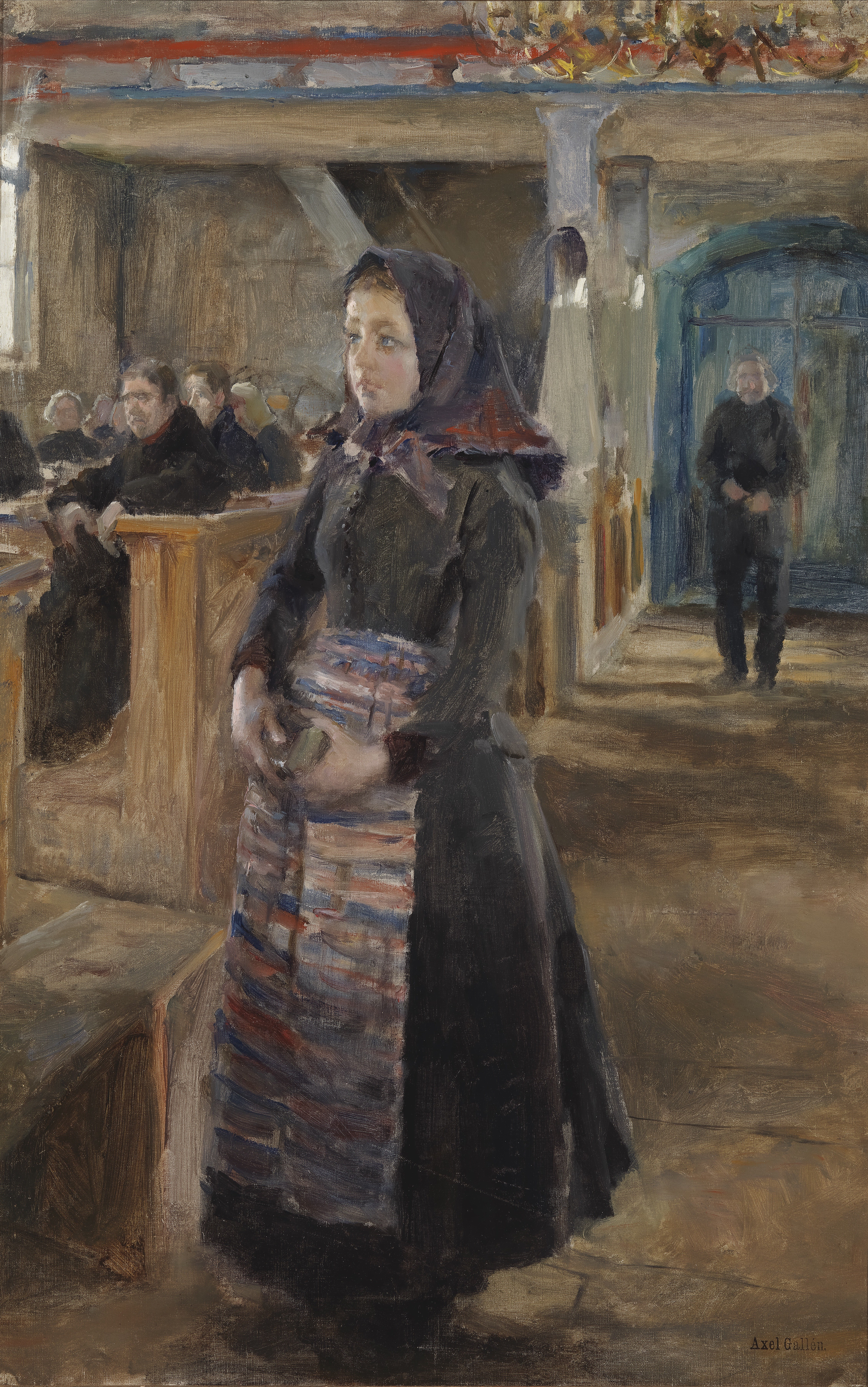
Girl in the Old Church of Keuruu, 1889 (fi)
(Note: The girl who modeled for the painting was a future parliament member, Maria Raunio.)

=== Marriage and Karelianism ===
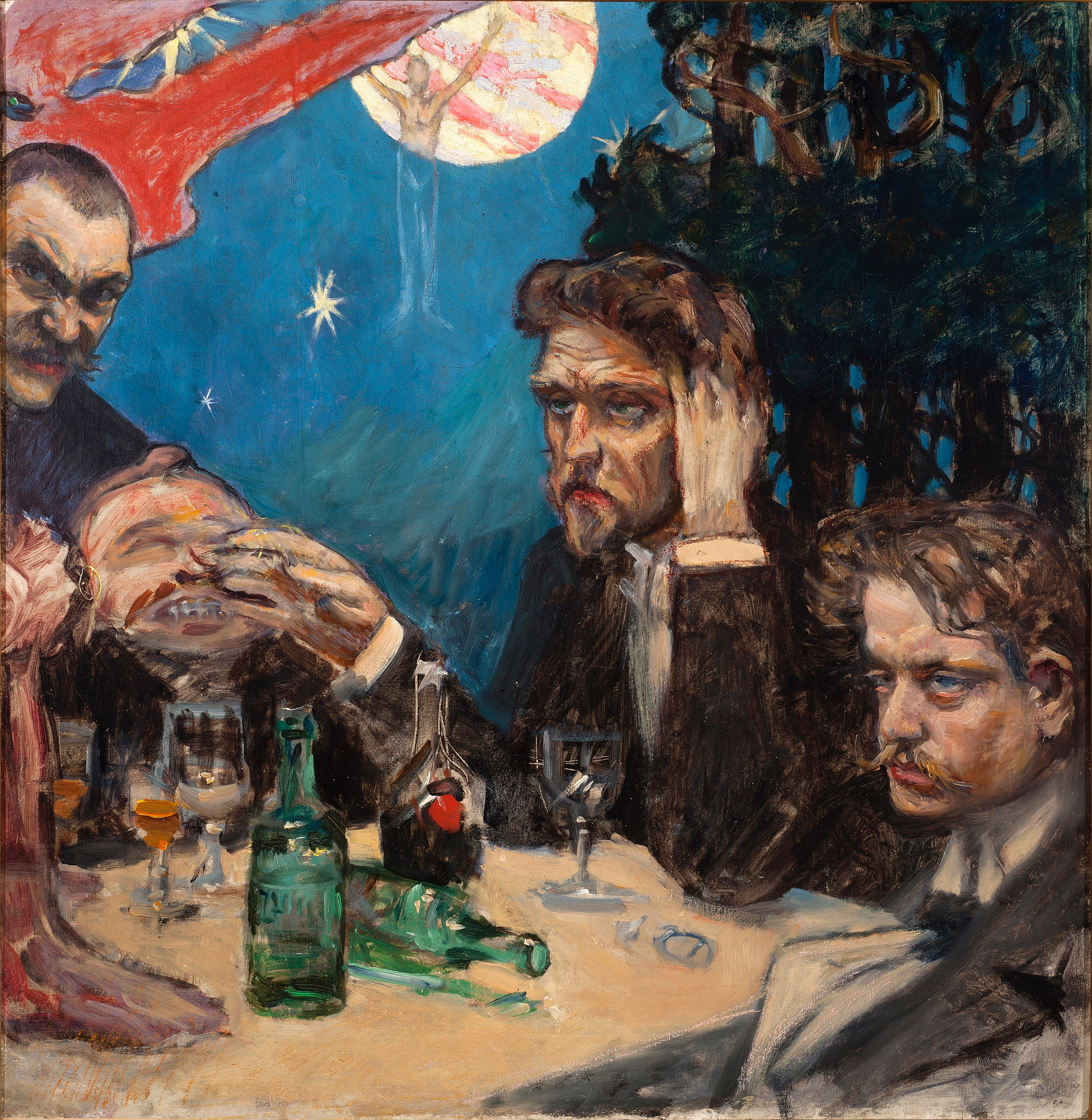
Problem (Symposium) depicting Gallen-Kallela himself, Oskar Merikanto, Robert Kajanus and Jean Sibelius, 1894 (fi)

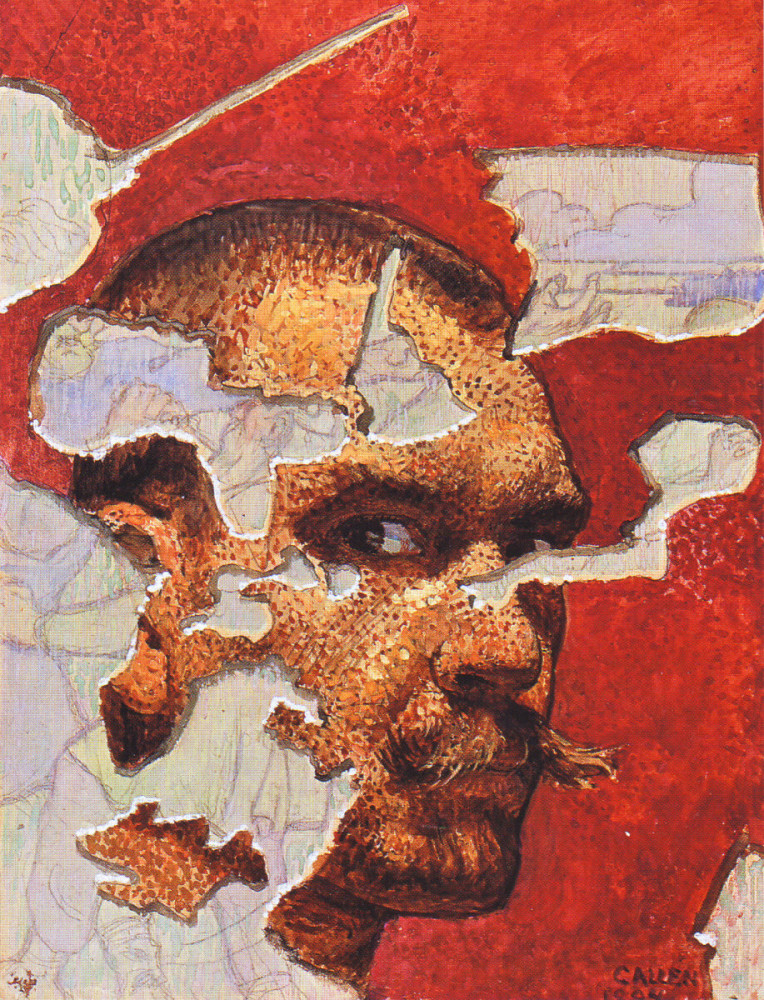
Self-Portrait in Fresco, 1894

He married Mary Helena Slöör in 1890. The couple had three children: Impi Marjatta (1891–1895), Kirsti (1896–1980) and Jorma (1898–1939). The eldest child died in infancy, while son Jorma was killed in the Winter War.On their honeymoon to Kuhmo in 1890, Gallen-Kallela traveled together with the Swedish painter Louis Sparre to East Karelia (Far Karelia) to collect material for his Kalevala depictions. The journey has come to be seen as the starting point of the artistic interest in Karelia later known as karelianism, a current that became central to Finnish national romanticism.

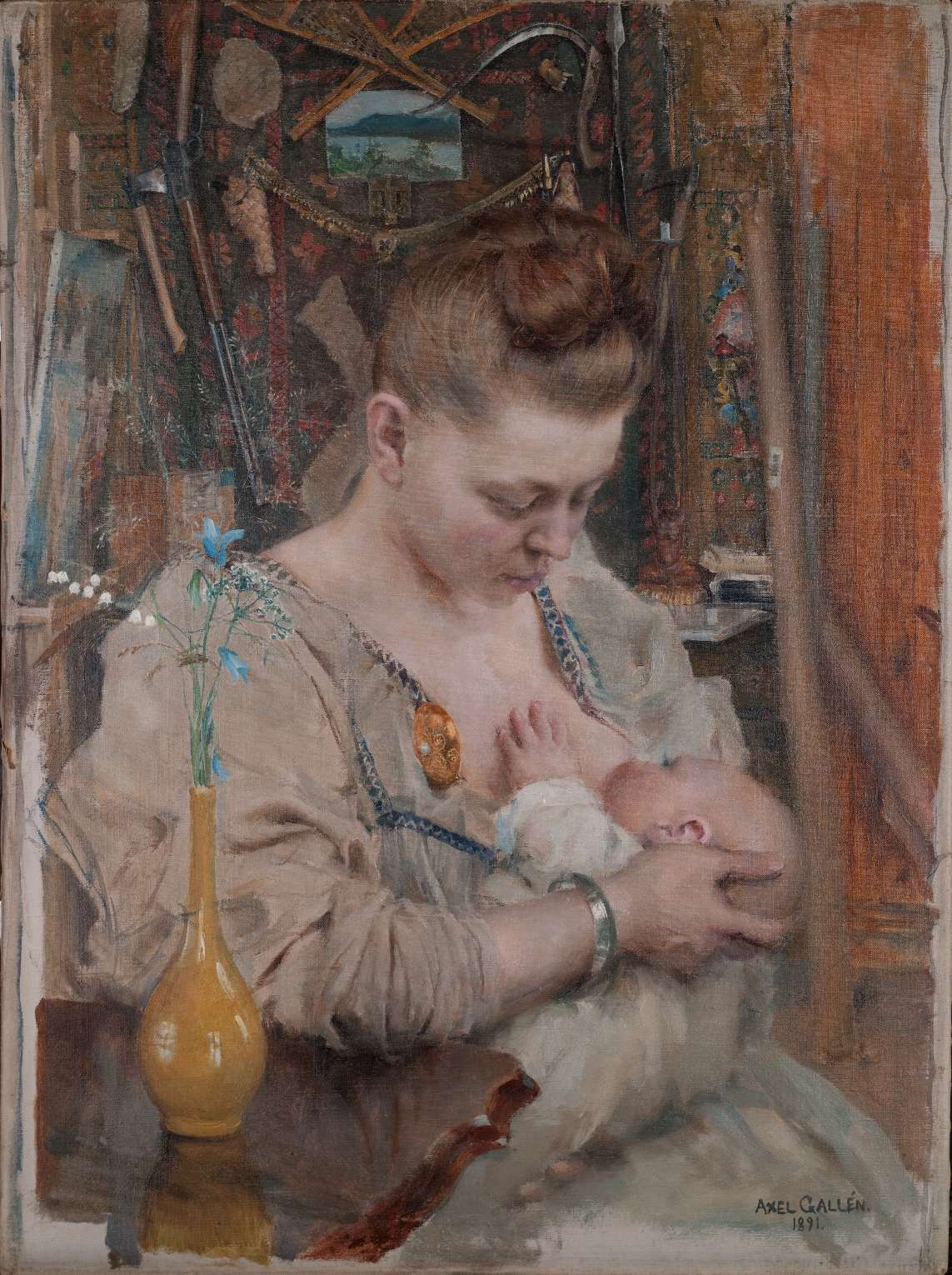
Madonna (Mary and Marjatta), 1891 (fi)

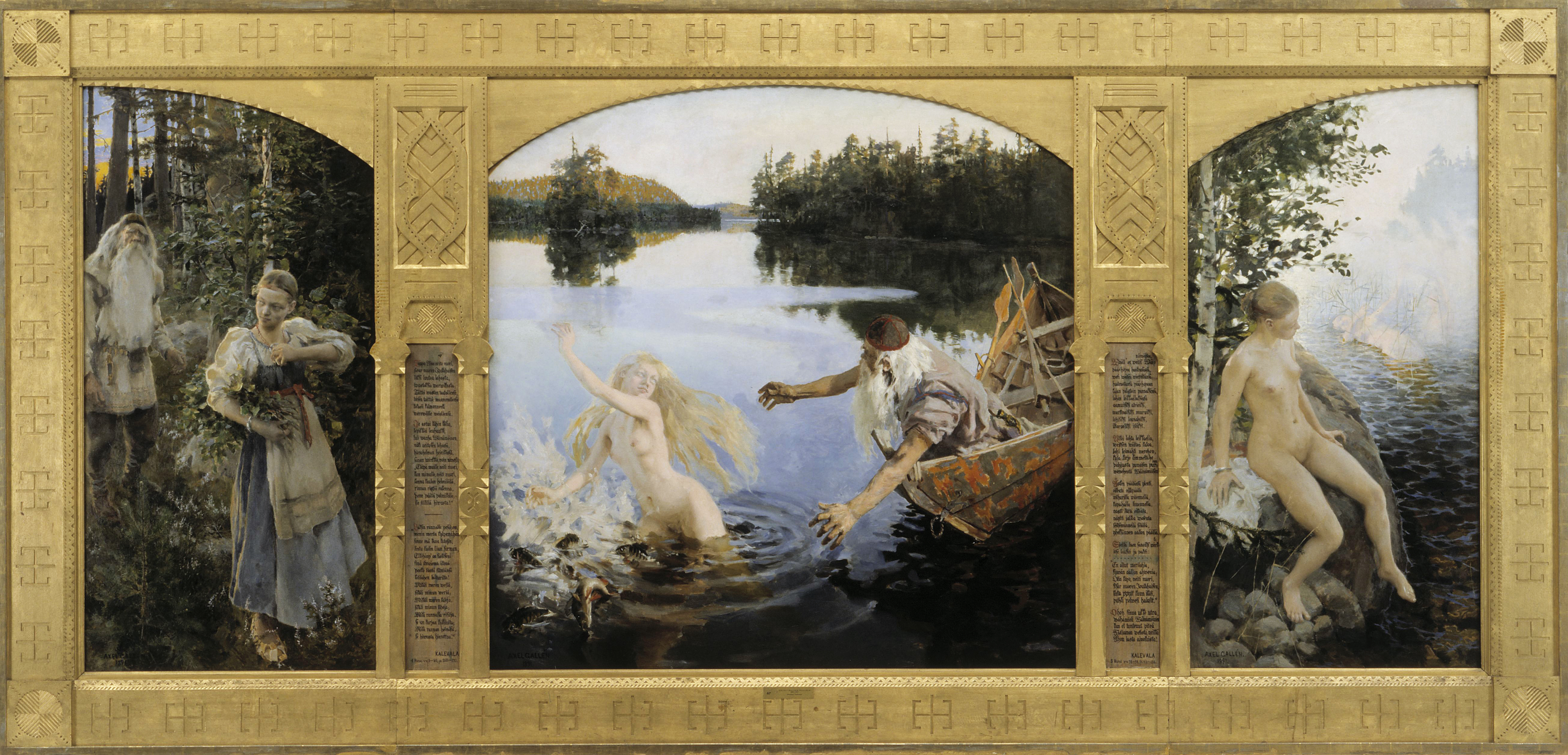
Aino Myth, Triptych, 1891 (fi)

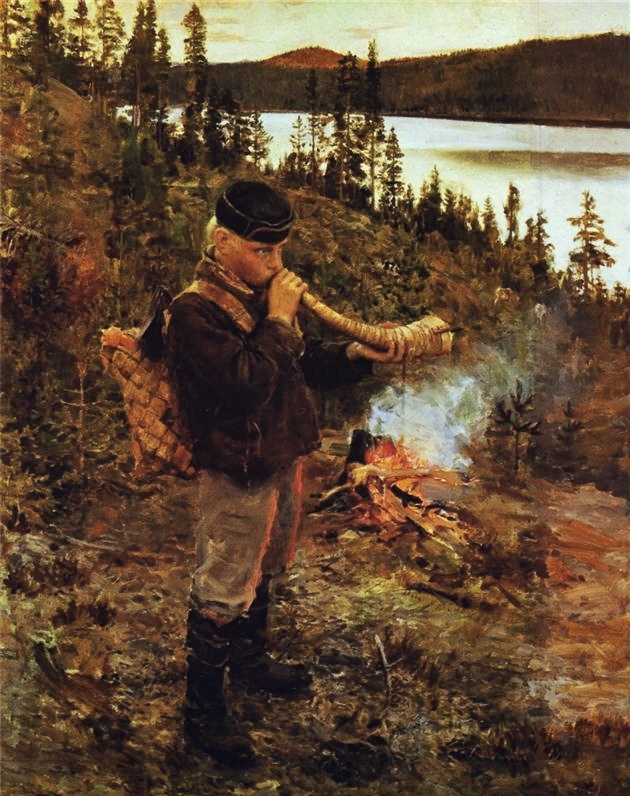
Shepherd Boy from Paanajärvi, 1892

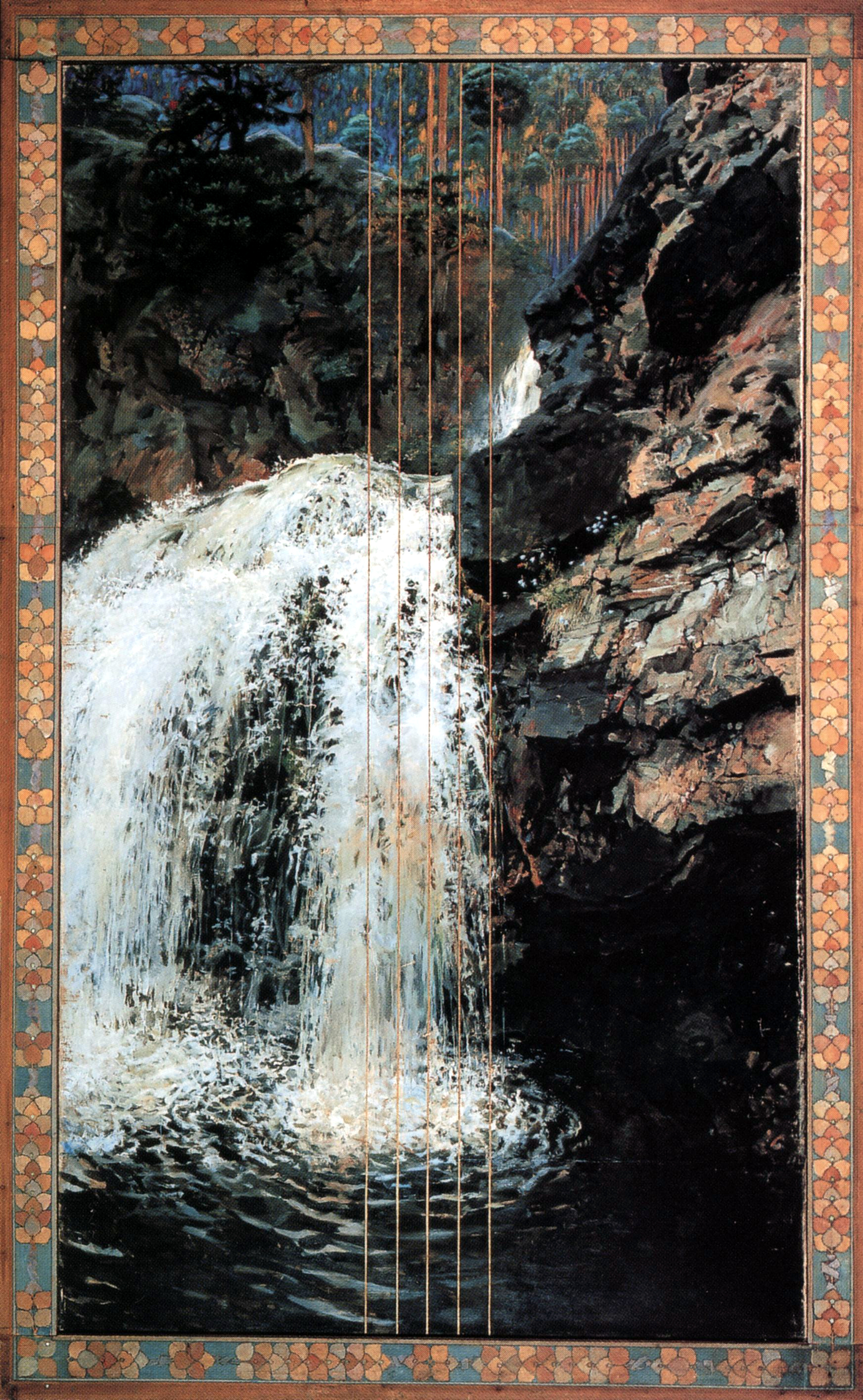
Mäntykoski Waterfall, 1892–1894 (fi)
(Note: The frames were painted by Elin Danielson-Gambogi.)

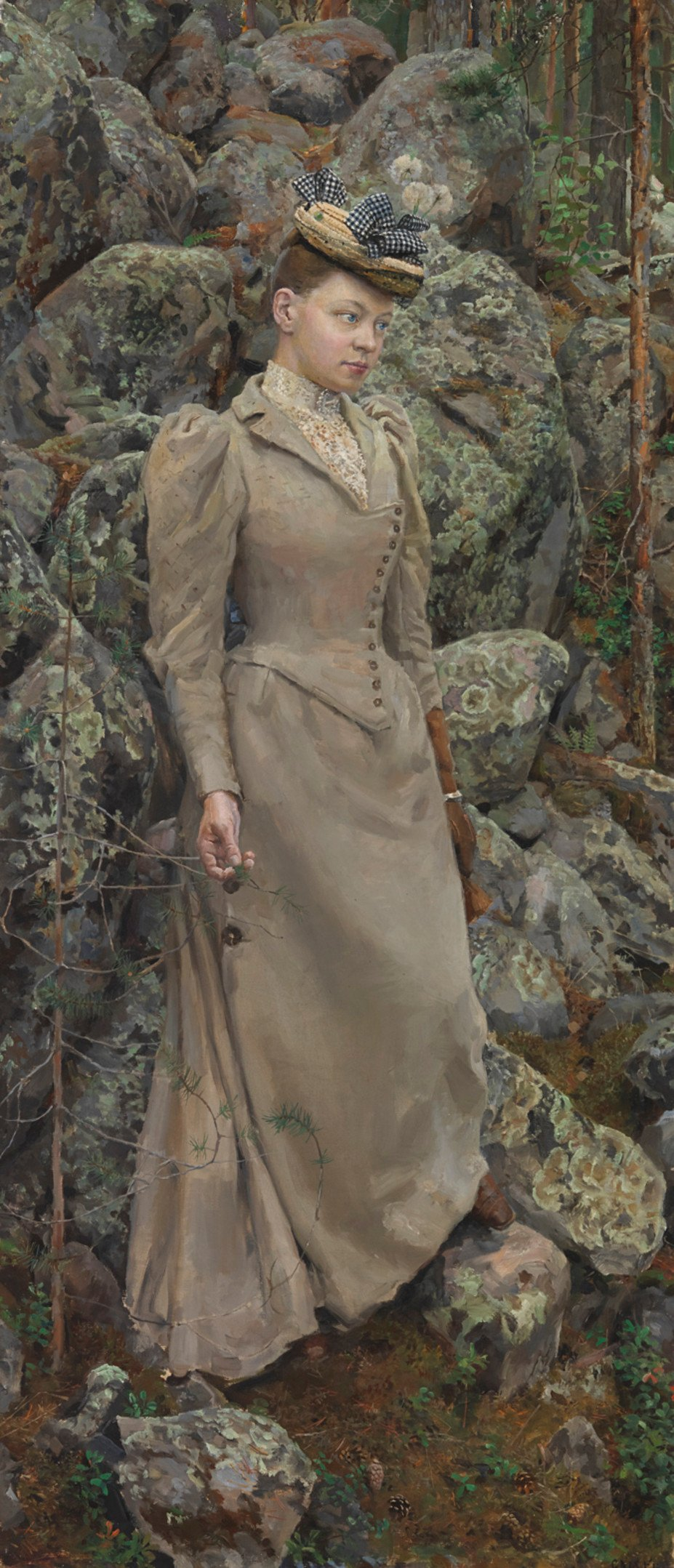
Portrait of the Artist's Wife, 1893

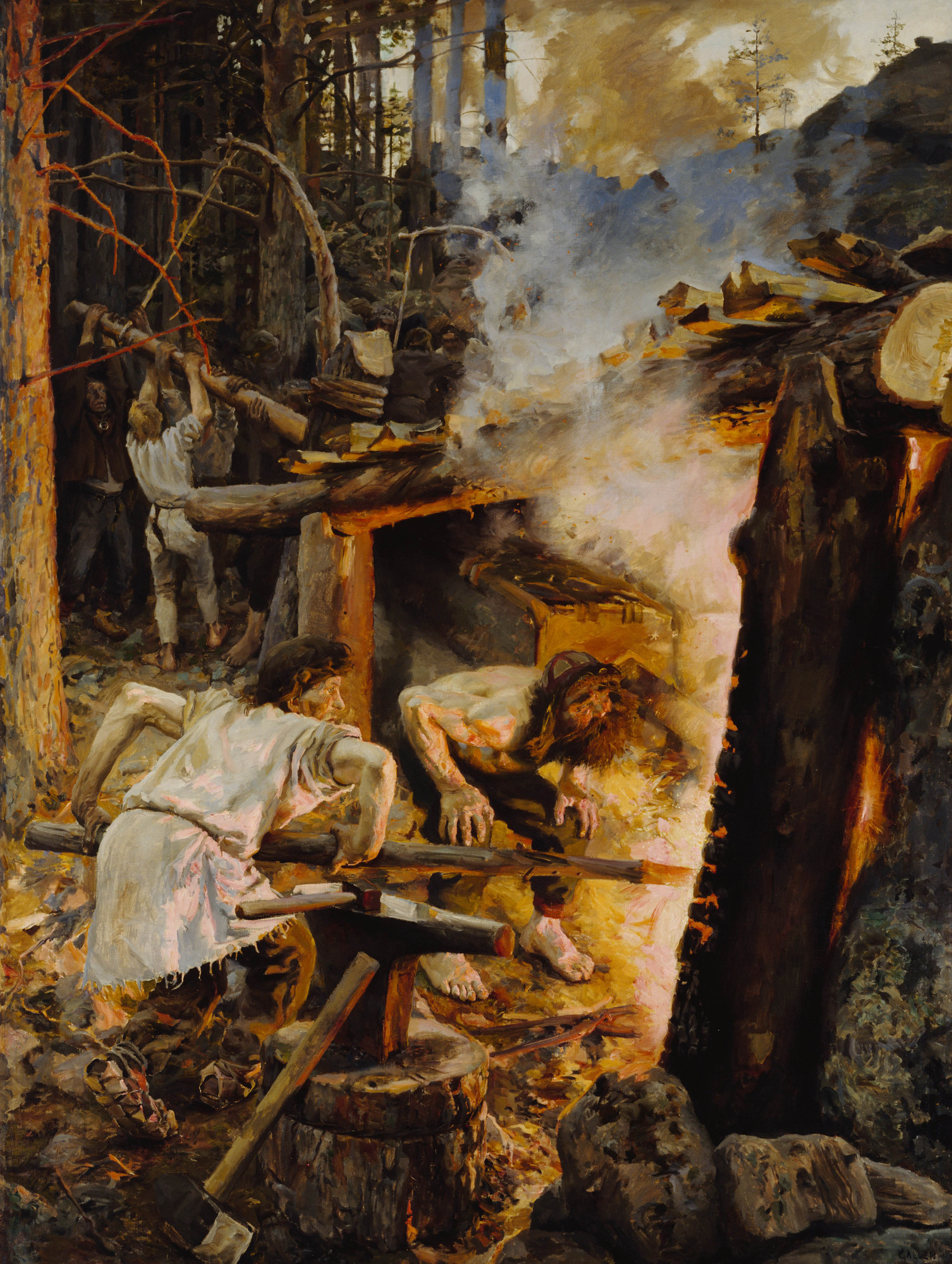
The Forging of the Sampo, 1893 (fi)

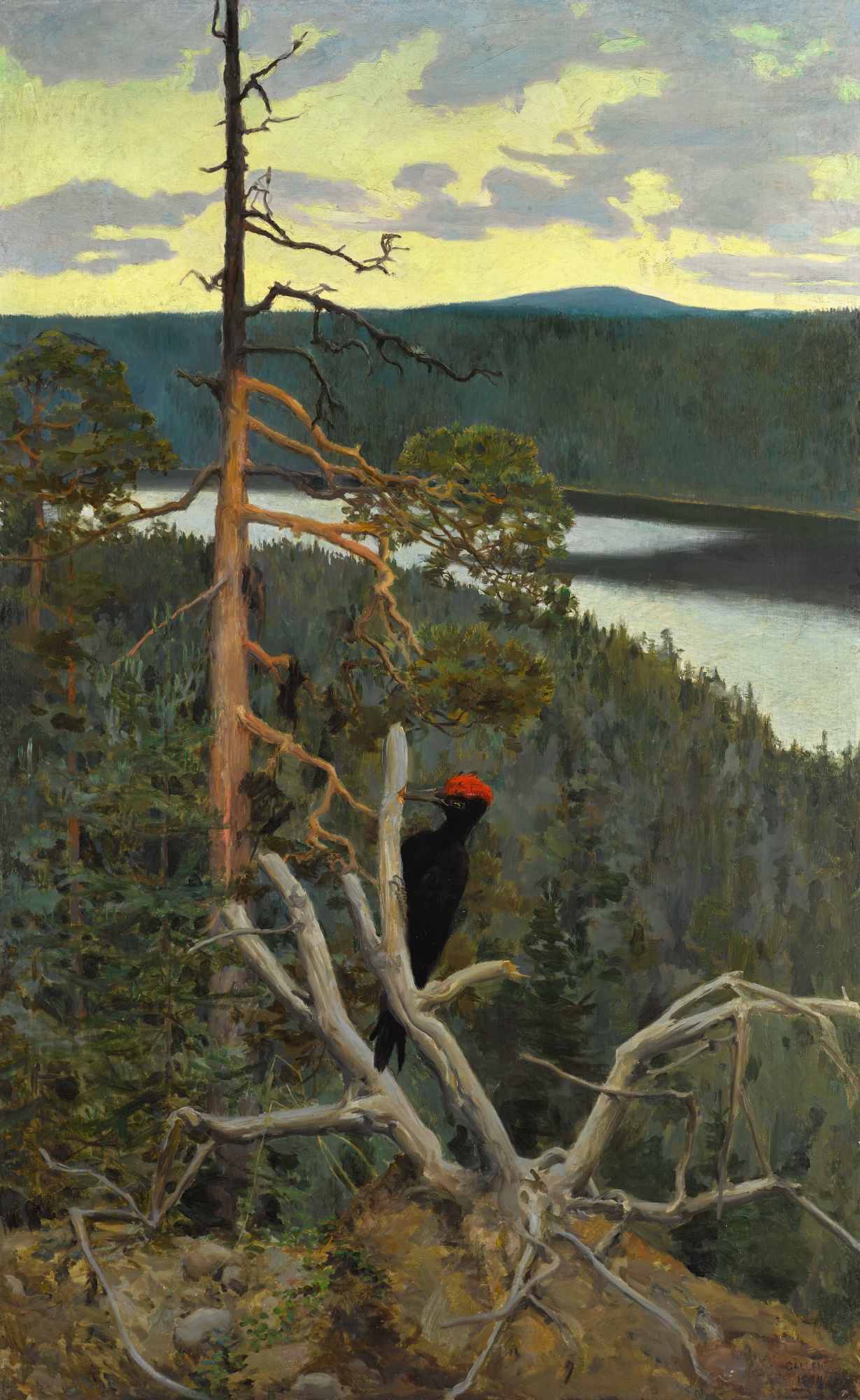
Black Woodpecker, 1894 (fi)

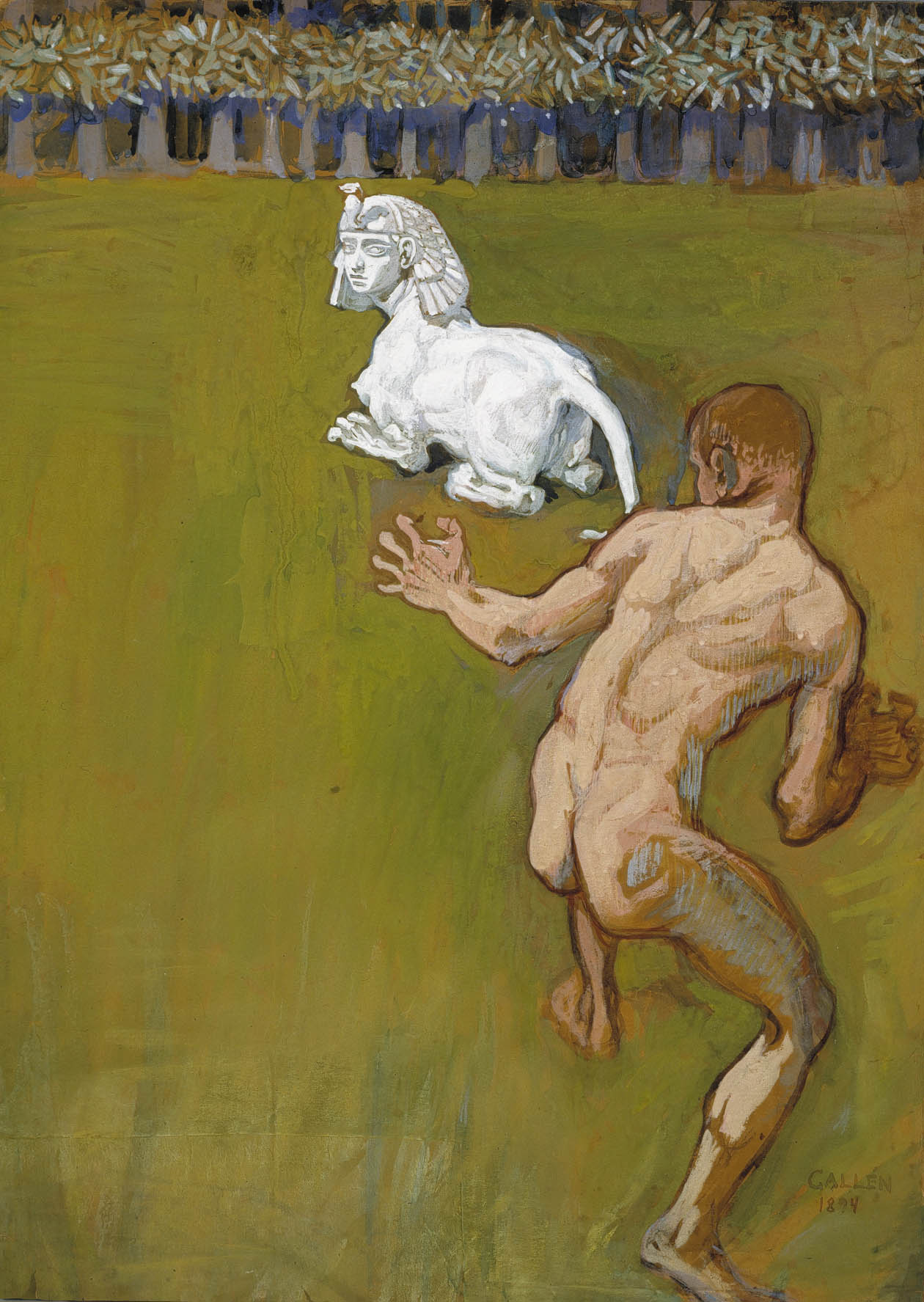
Conceptio Artis, 1894

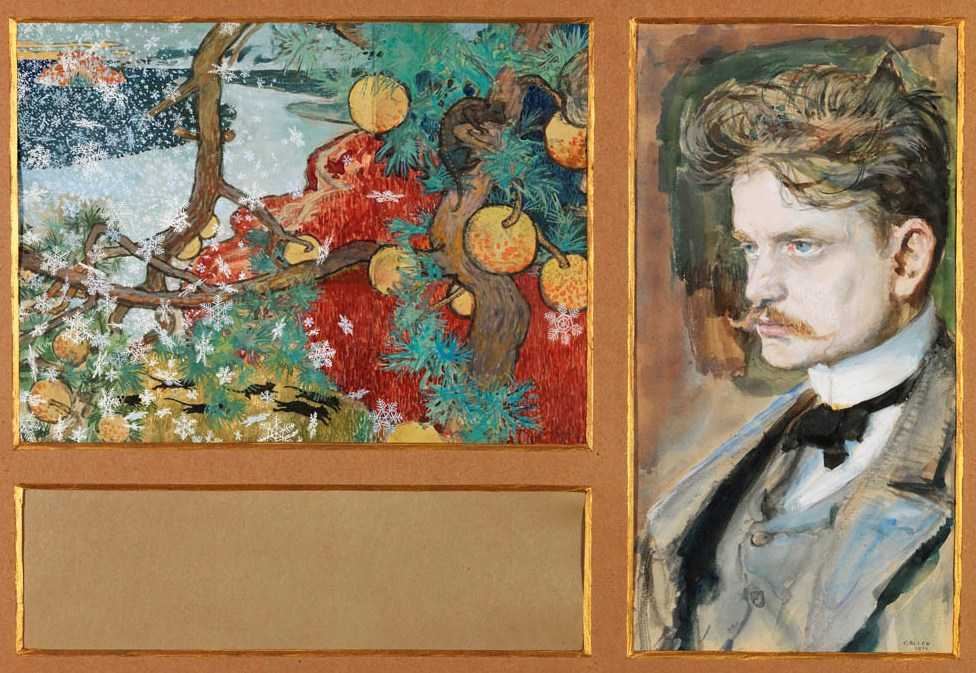
Sibelius as the Composer of En saga, 1894
(Note: Gallen-Kallela was inspired by Sibelius' tone poem En saga (A Fairy Tale). On the right is Sibelius himself, at top left is the visuals it brought to Gallen-Kallela's mind and the empty section at bottom left was supposed to have notes from the tone poem, but Sibelius didn't wish to add them.)

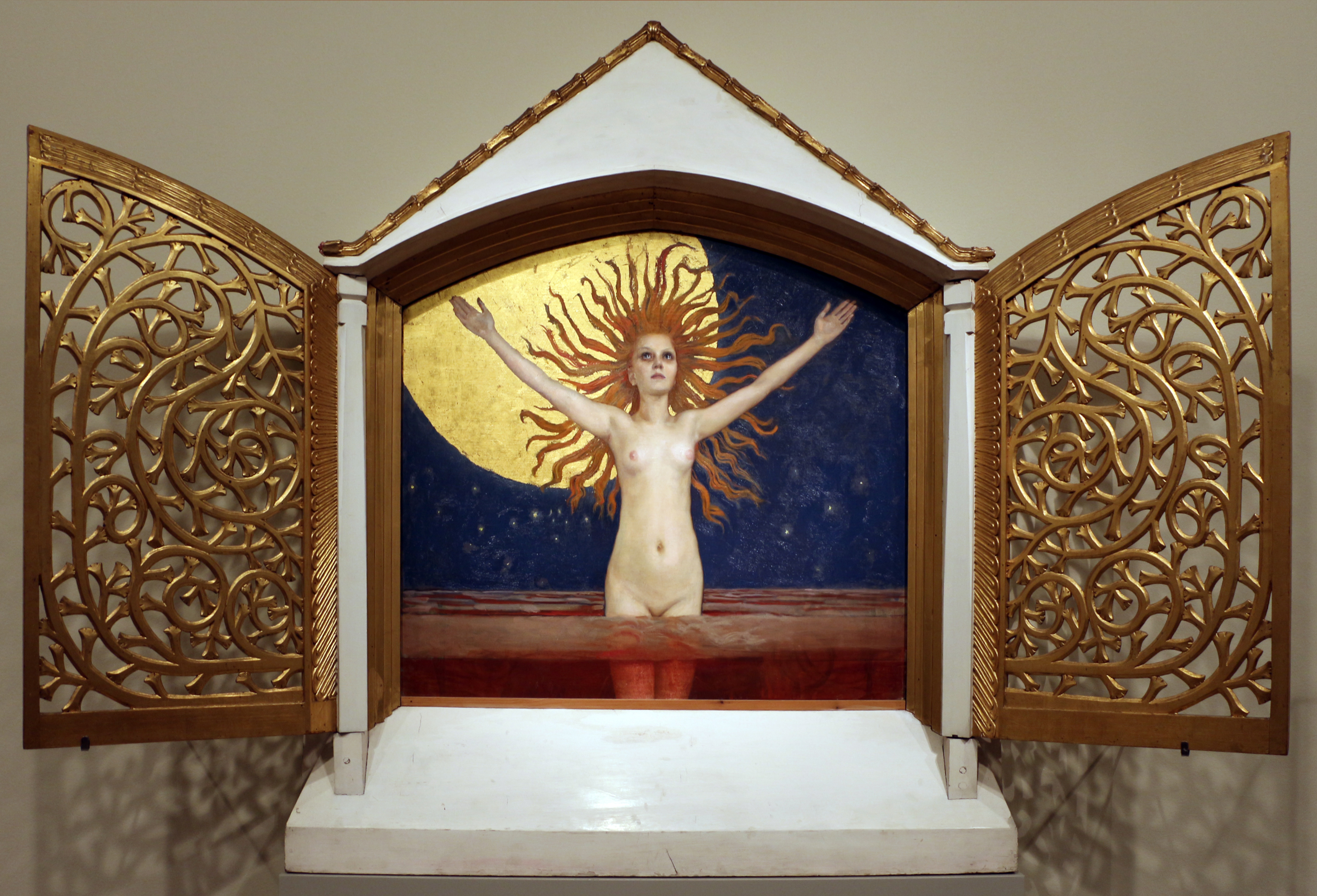
Ad Astra, 1894 (fi)

=== Berlin and the Kalevala paintings ===
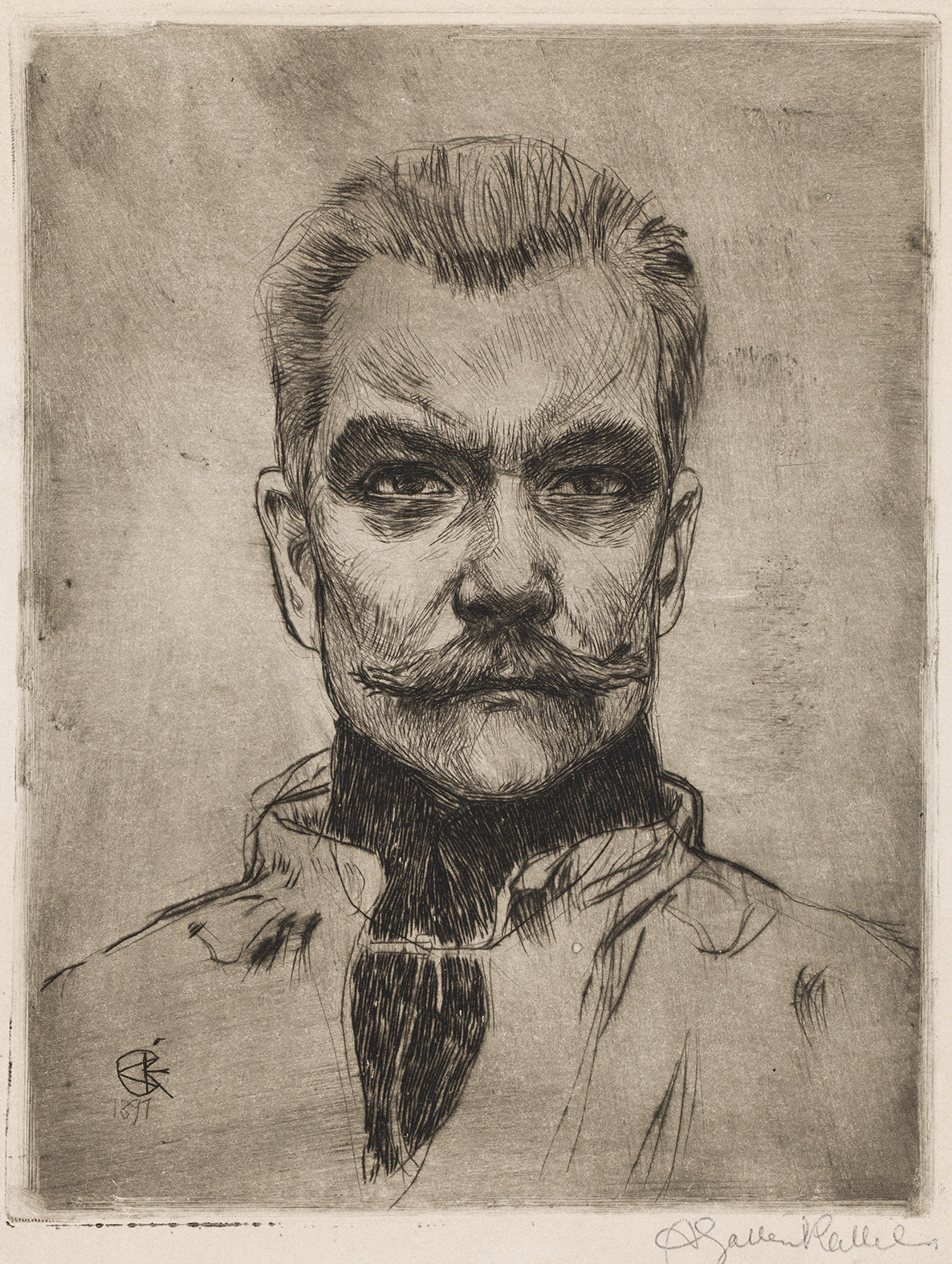
Self-Portrait ’en face’, 1897

In December 1894, Gallen-Kallela moved to Berlin to oversee the joint exhibition of his works with the works of Norwegian painter Edvard Munch. At the time Gallen-Kallela also designed a grand cabin called Kalela for his family far from everything on the shore of Lake Ruovesi. It was built from dead standing pine by 13 local carpenters in a year from 1894 to 1895.

In March 1895, the trip was cut short when he received a telegram that his daughter Impi Marjatta had died from diphtheria, a loss which would prove to be a turning point in his work. His works had been romantic, but after his daughter's death, Gallen-Kallela's works became more aggressive. From 1896 to 1899, he painted what are considered his most famous works: The Defense of the Sampo, Lemminkäinen's Mother, Joukahainen's Revenge and Kullervo's Curse. In May 1895, Gallen and Mary visited London, with his intent being the purchase of a graphic art press. There, he also learned about stained glass. At the end of 1897 the family took a trip to Florence, also visiting Pompeii, where he studied the art of frescoes.

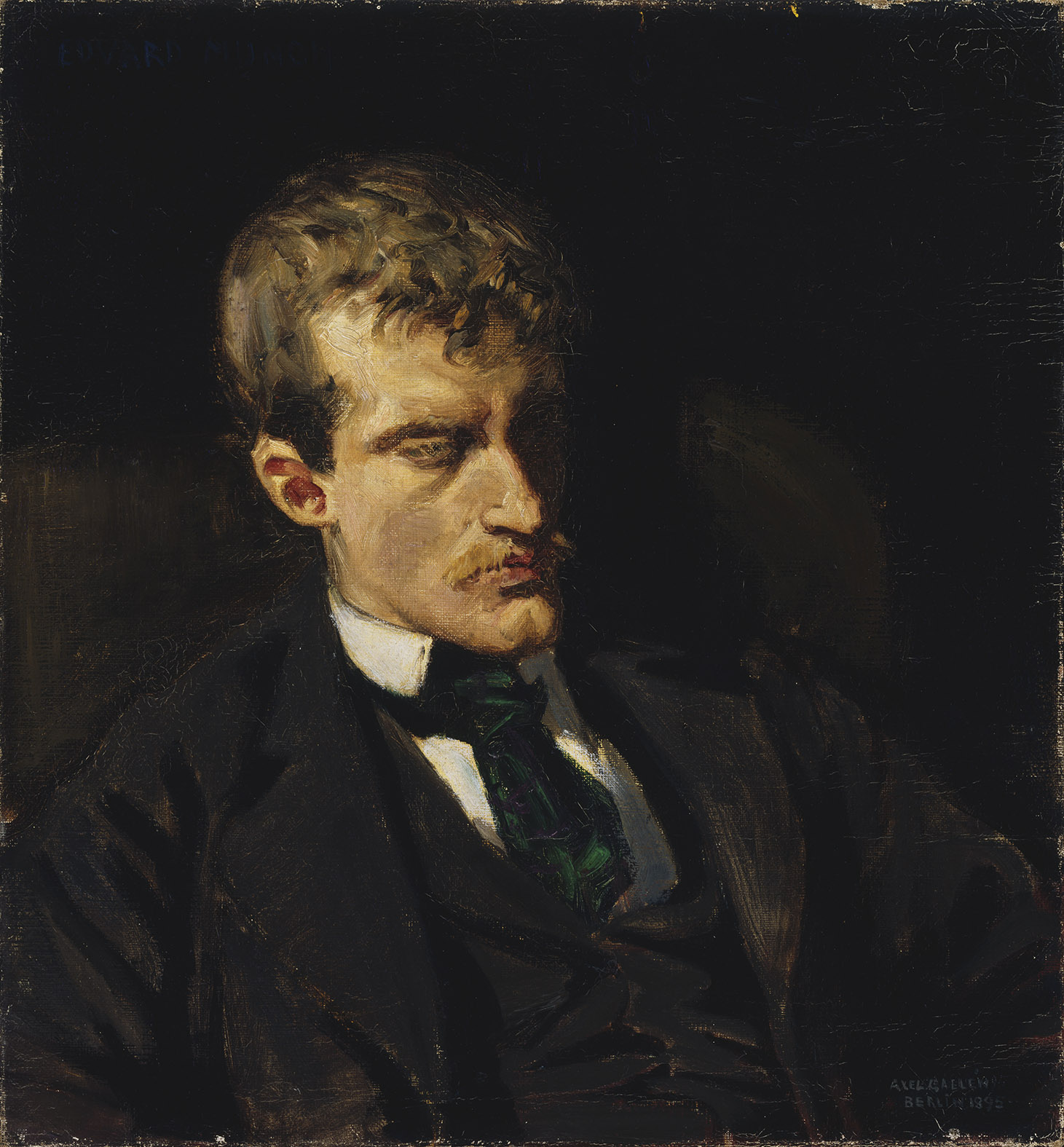
Portrait of Edvard Munch, 1895

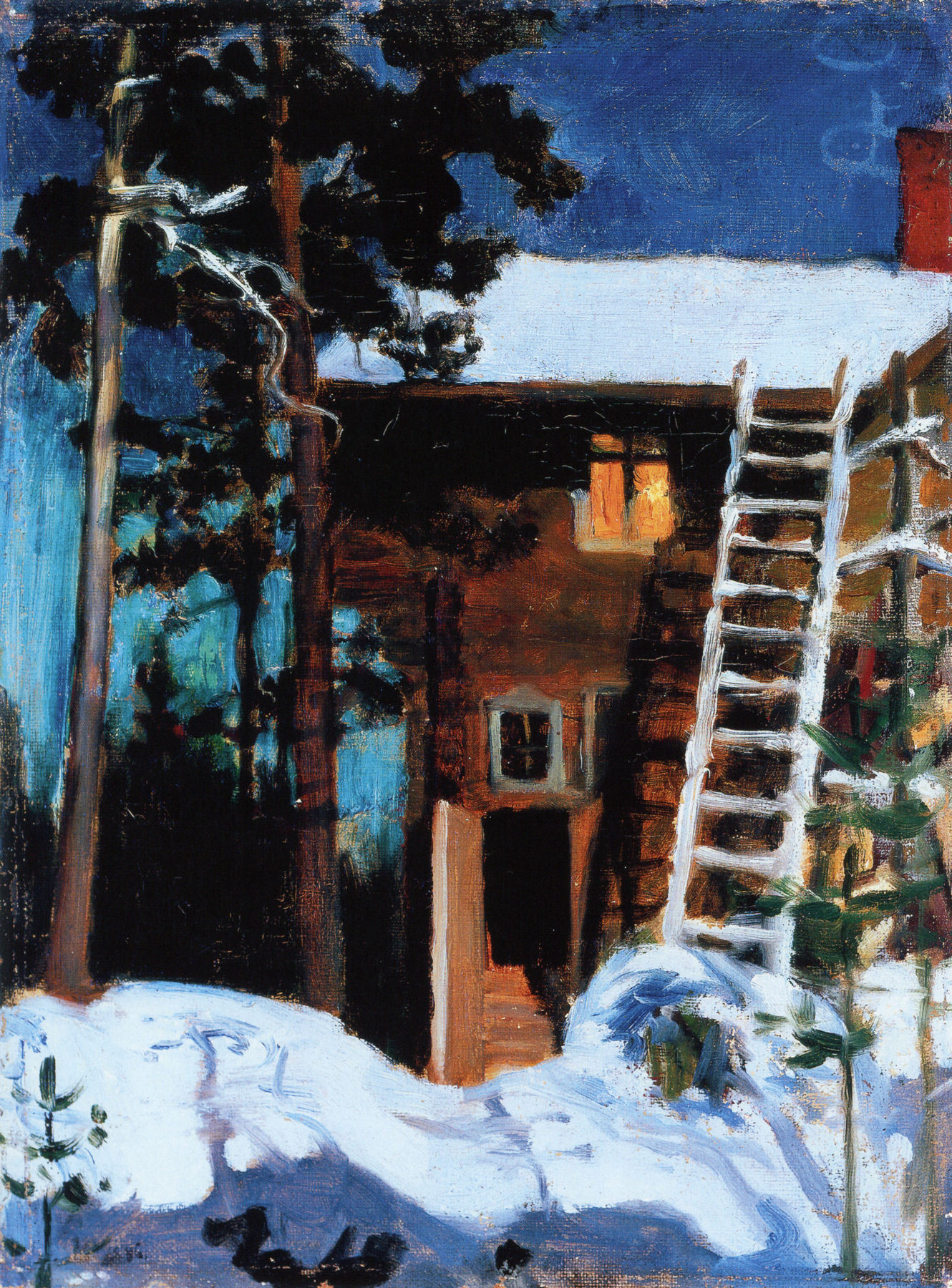
Kalela on a Winter Night, 1896

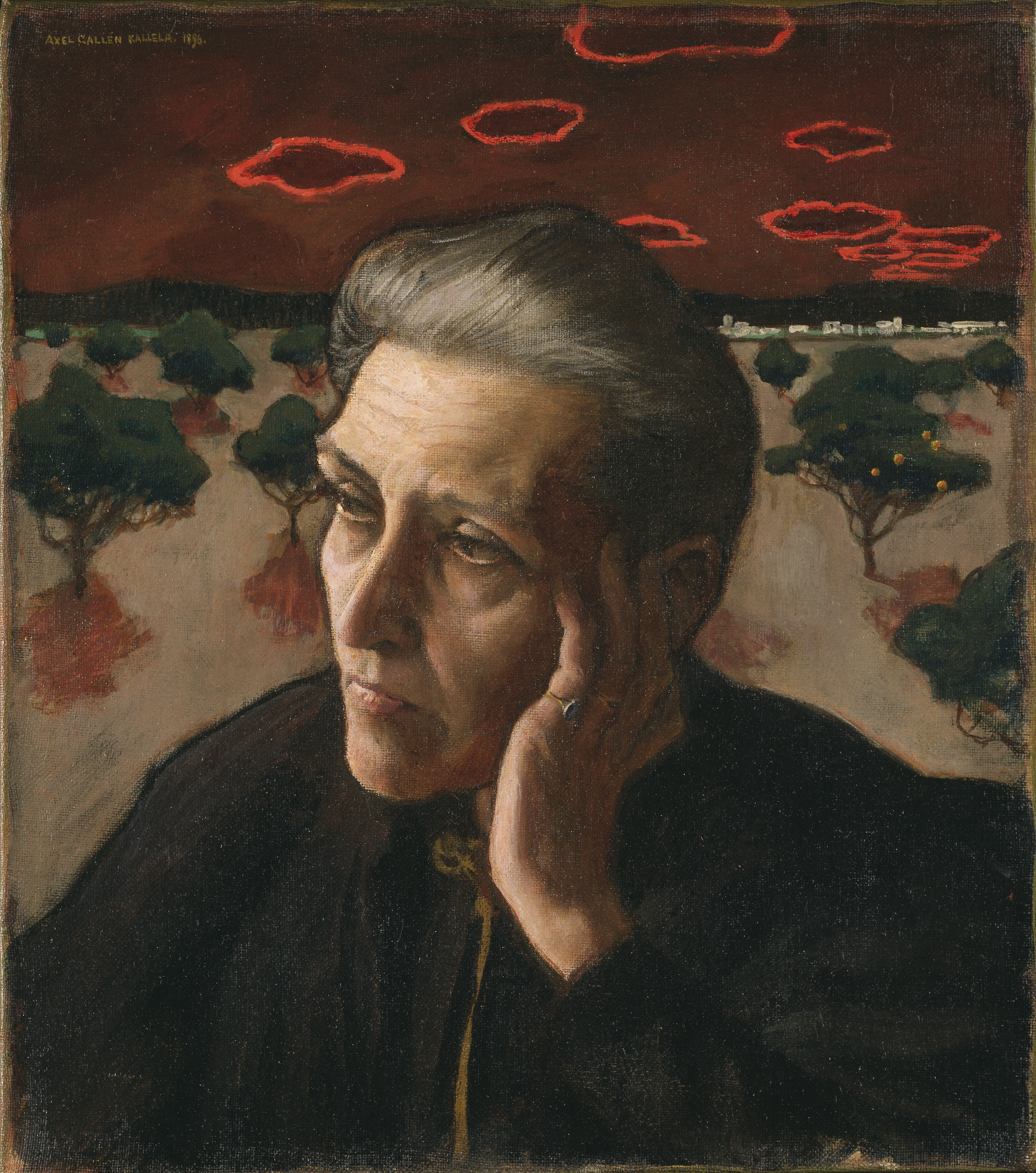
The Artist's Mother, 1896

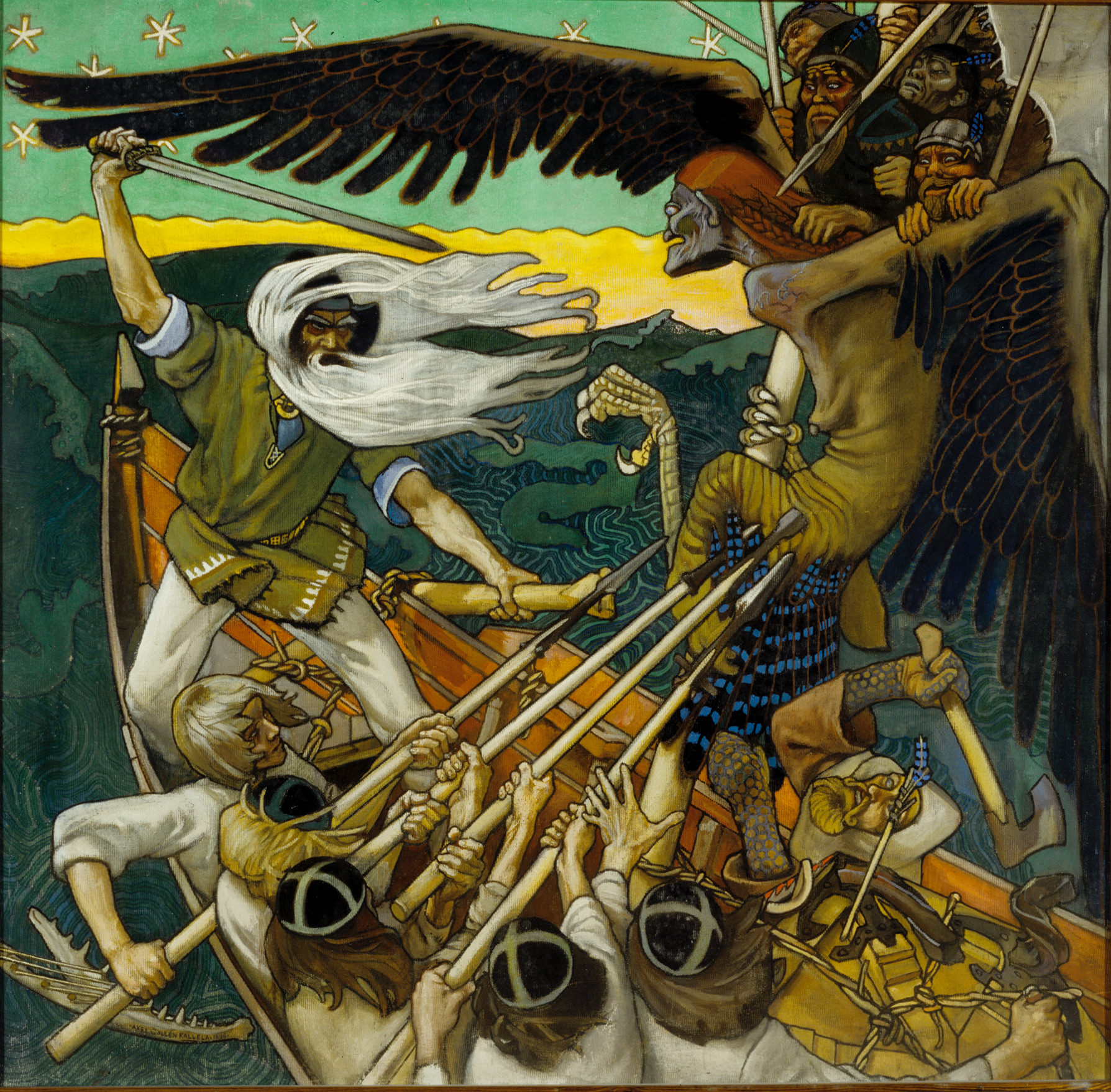
The Defense of the Sampo, 1896

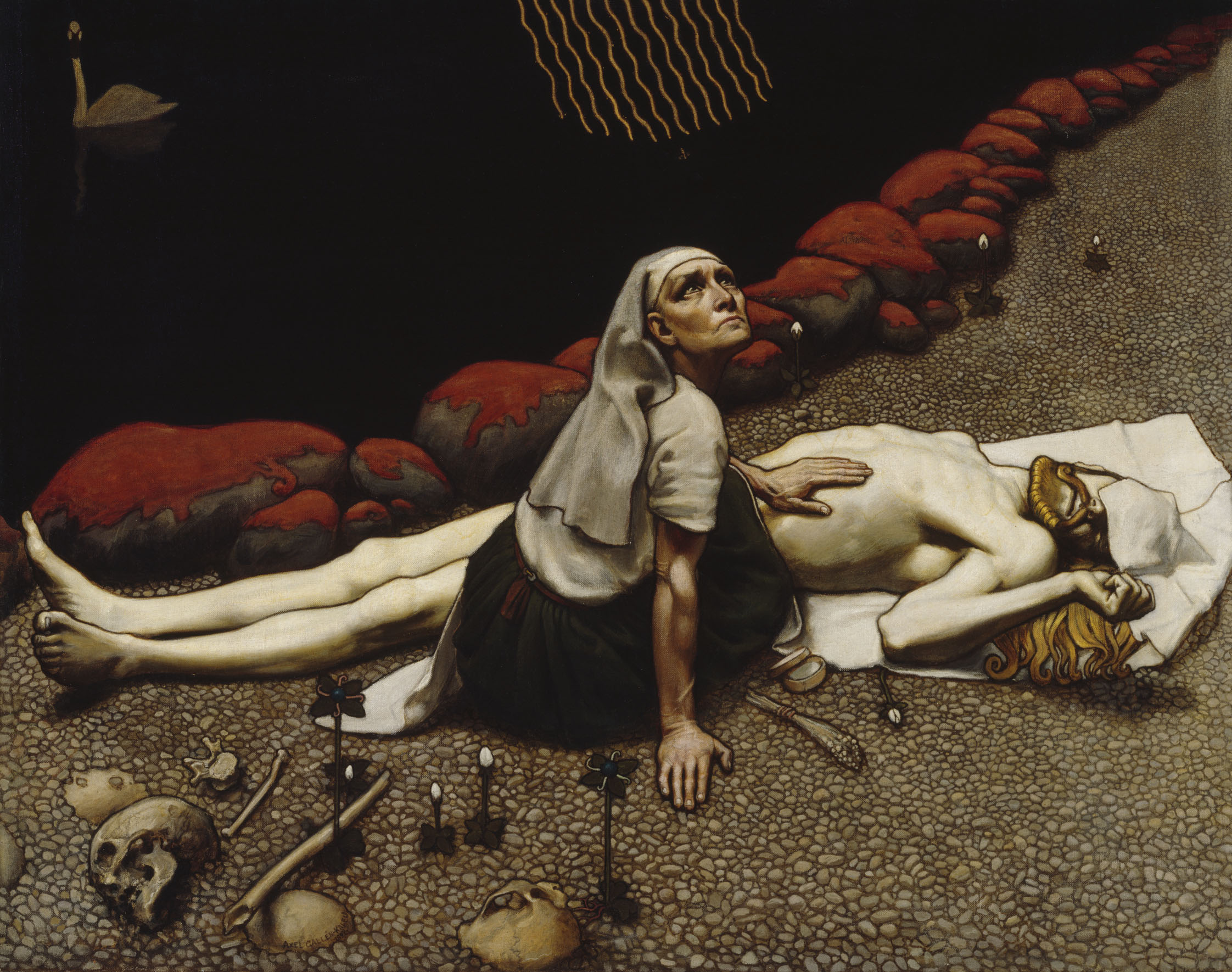
Lemminkäinen's Mother, 1897

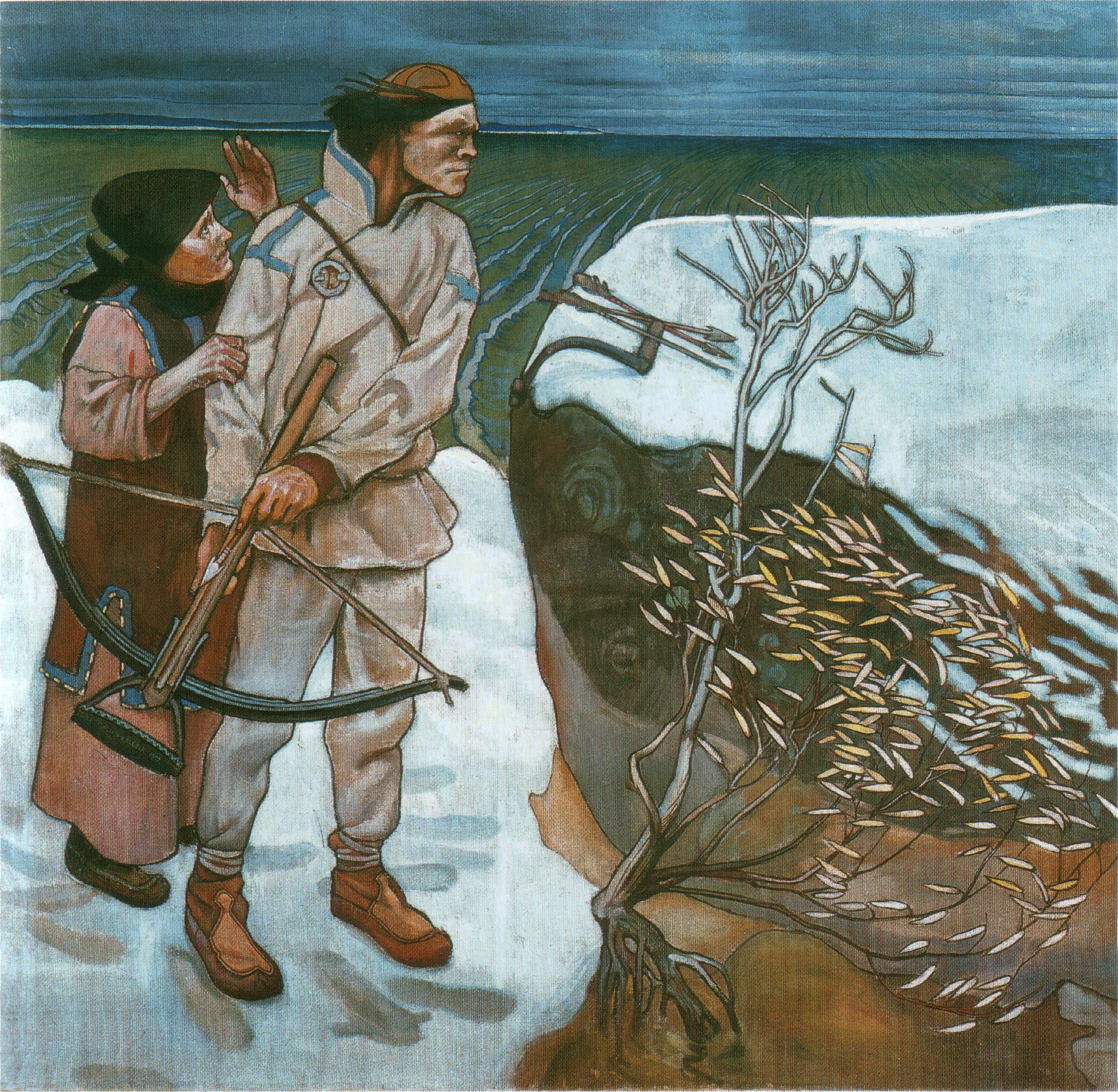
Joukahainen's Revenge, 1897 (fi)

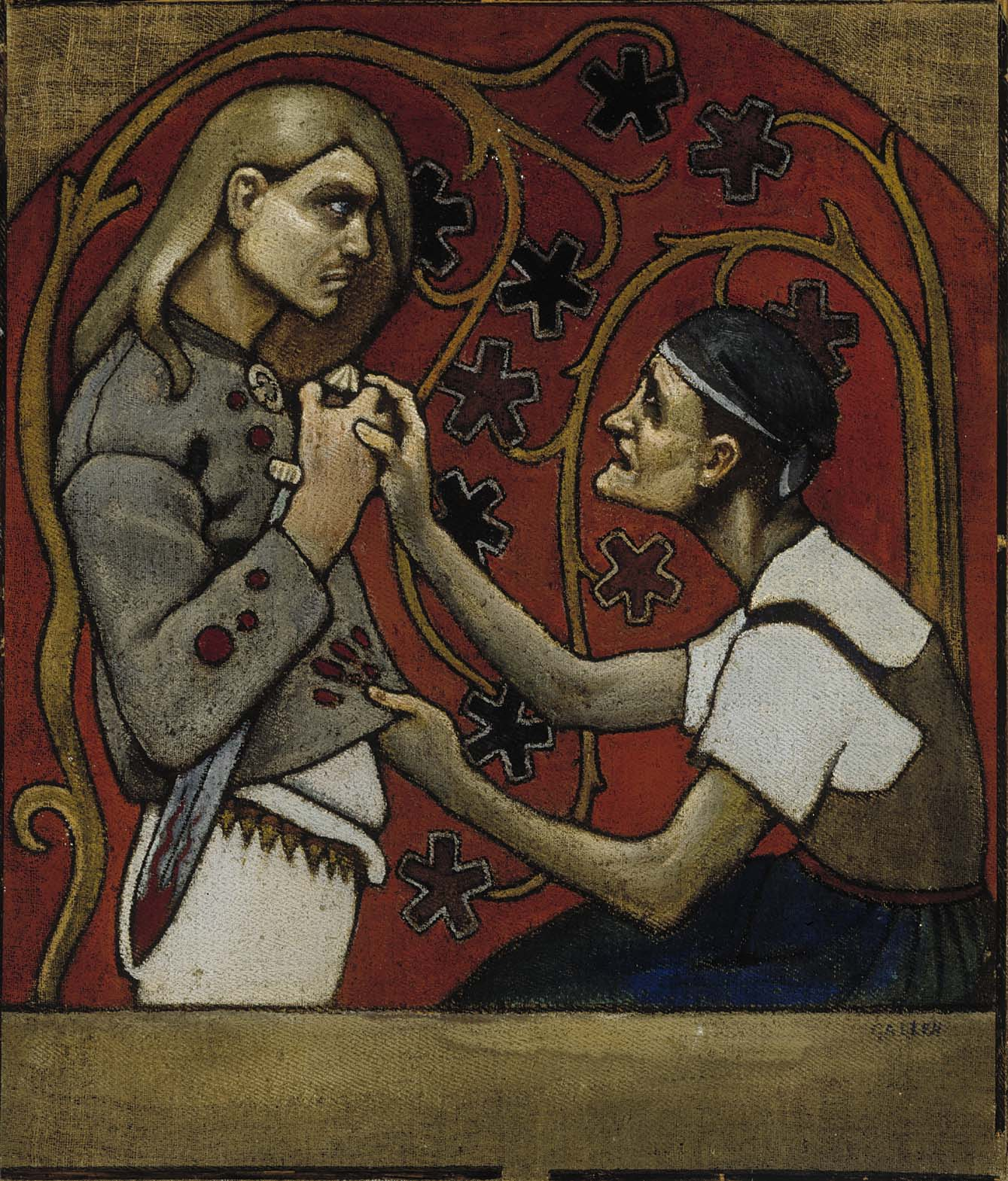
The Fratricide, 1897, from Kanteletar

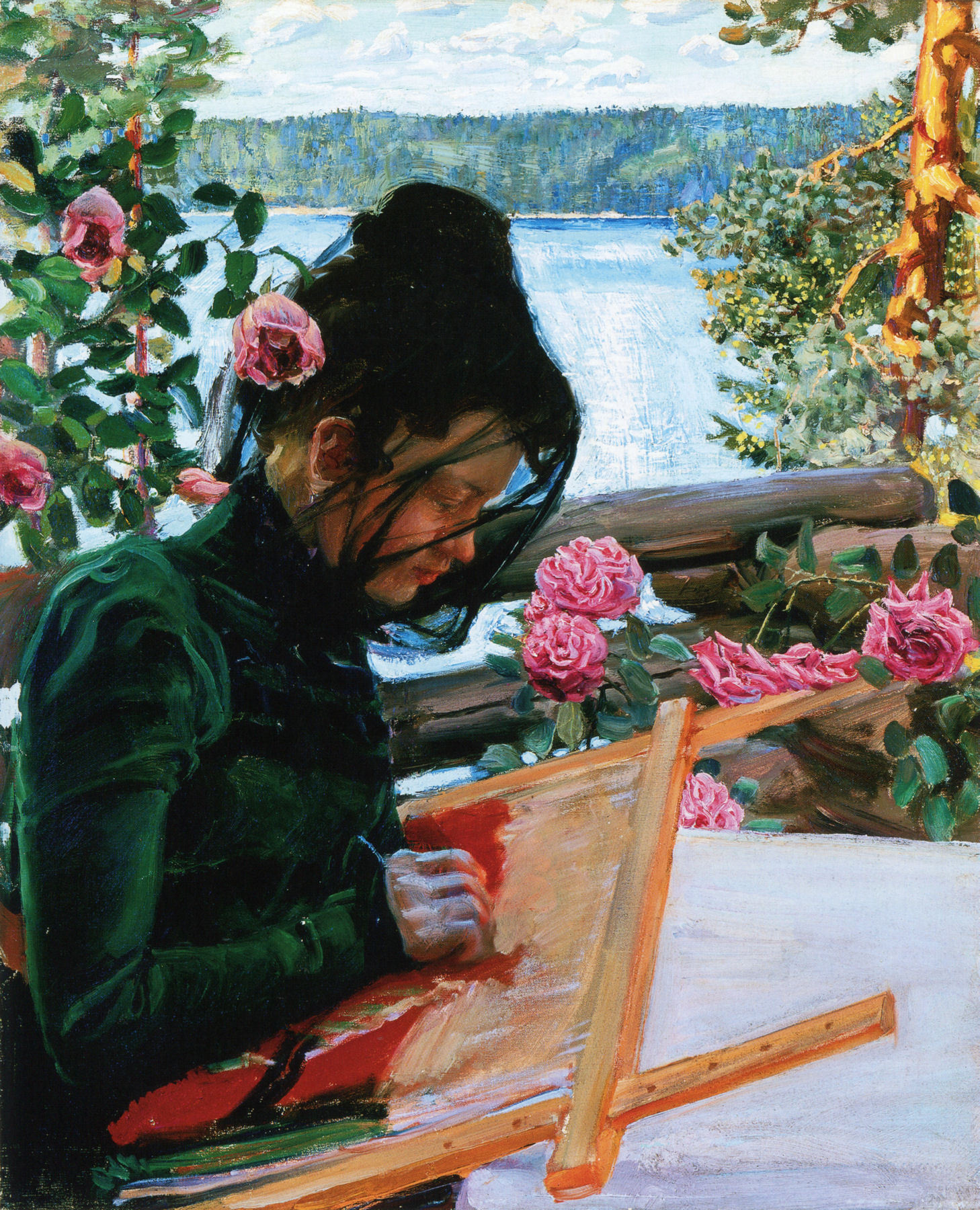
Mary Sewing on the Veranda of Kalela, 1897

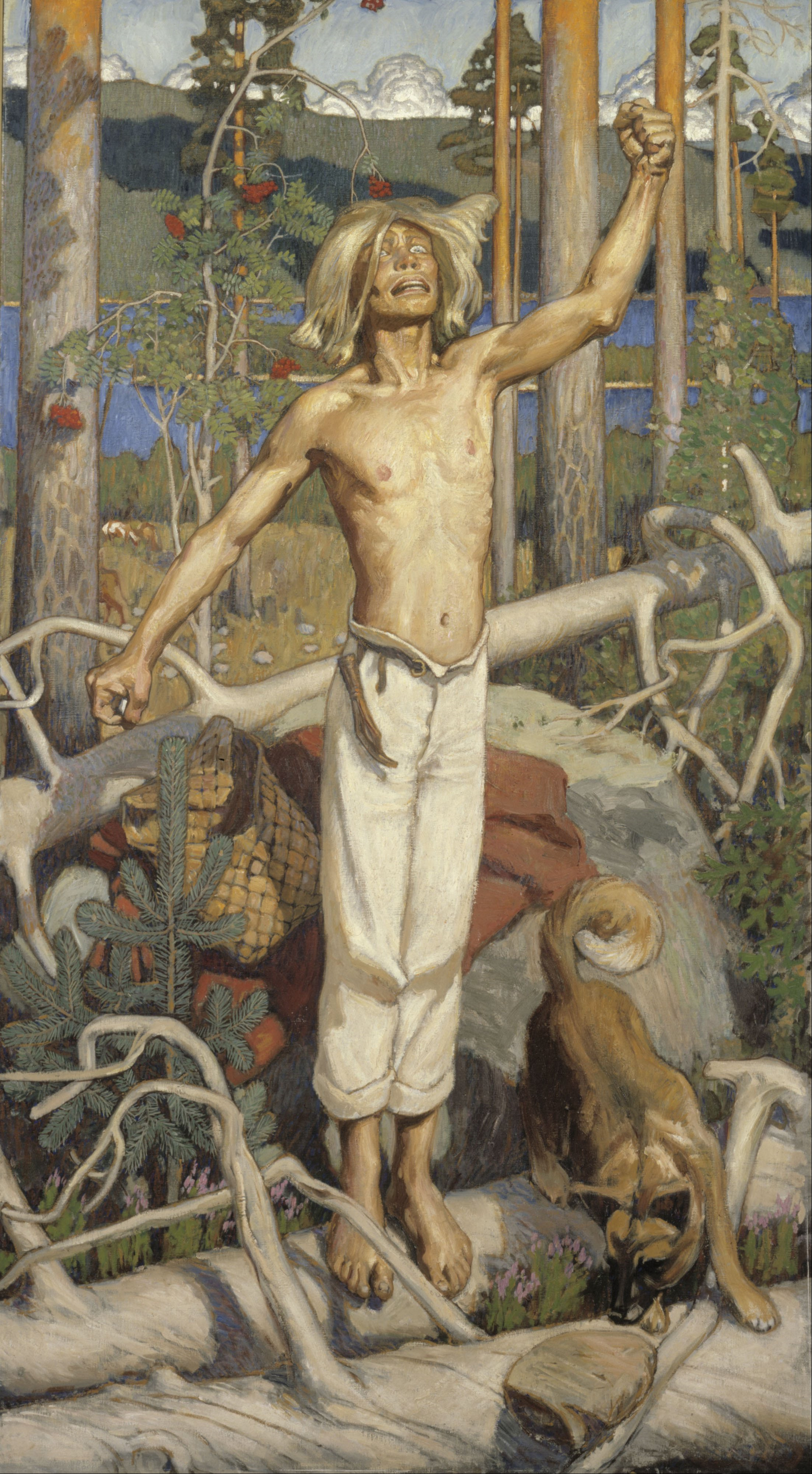
Kullervo's Curse, 1899 (fi)

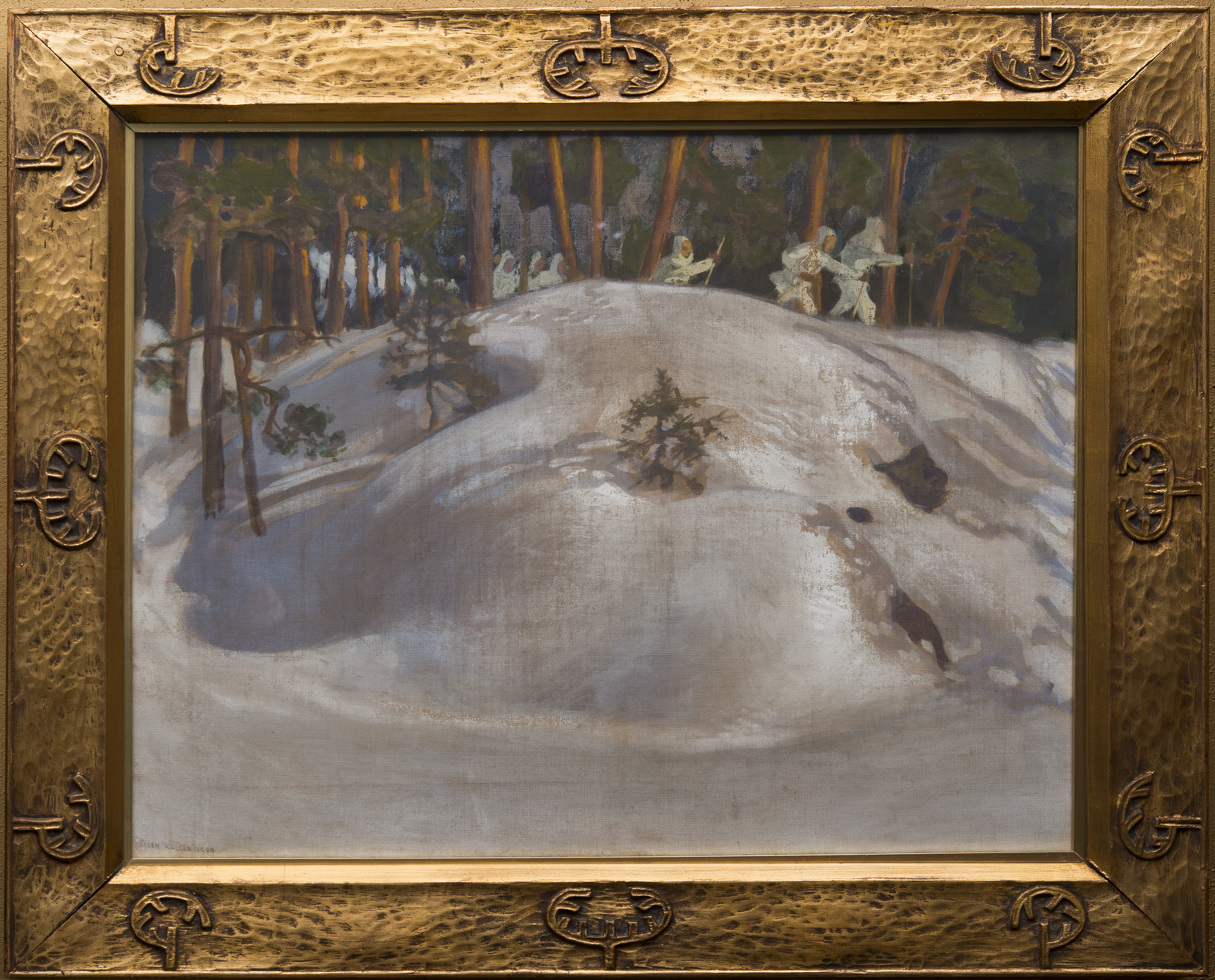
February Vision, 1899

=== Monumental works and recognition ===
For the Paris World Fair in 1900, Gallen-Kallela painted frescoes for the cupola of the Finnish Pavilion, with motifs including The Forging of the Sampo, The Defense of the Sampo, Ilmarinen Plowing the Field of Vipers and The Departure of Väinämöinen. In the fresco Ilmarinen Plowing the Field of Vipers there was a hidden political message: one of the vipers is wearing a small Romanov crown, reflecting Gallen-Kallela's wish for an independent Finland at the time of the Russification of Finland. He also designed the so-called Iris Room for the Friends of Finnish Handicraft. The pavilion was a major international success for Gallen-Kallela, who was awarded two gold medals and two silver medals at the exposition.

The Paris Exposition secured Gallen-Kallela's stature as the leading Finnish artist. In 1901, he was commissioned to paint the fresco, Kullervo Sets Off for War, for the concert hall of the Helsinki Student's Union. Between 1901 and 1903, he painted the frescoes for the Jusélius Mausoleum in Pori, memorializing the 11-year-old daughter of the industrialist Fritz Arthur Jusélius. (The frescoes however were soon damaged by dampness, and were completely destroyed by fire in December 1931. Jusélius assigned the artist's son Jorma to repaint them from the original sketches. The reconstruction was completed just before Jorma's death in 1939.)

Gallen-Kallela officially finnicized his name to Akseli Gallen-Kallela in 1907. In 1907, Gallen-Kallela also made his first trip to Hungary, where he was awarded a large gold medal at an international exhibition. The following year he arranged an exhibition of drawings and sketches in Budapest. His idea for a 700-page Great Kalevala was fully formed in 1909 with a publication of his plan in the Valvoja magazine.

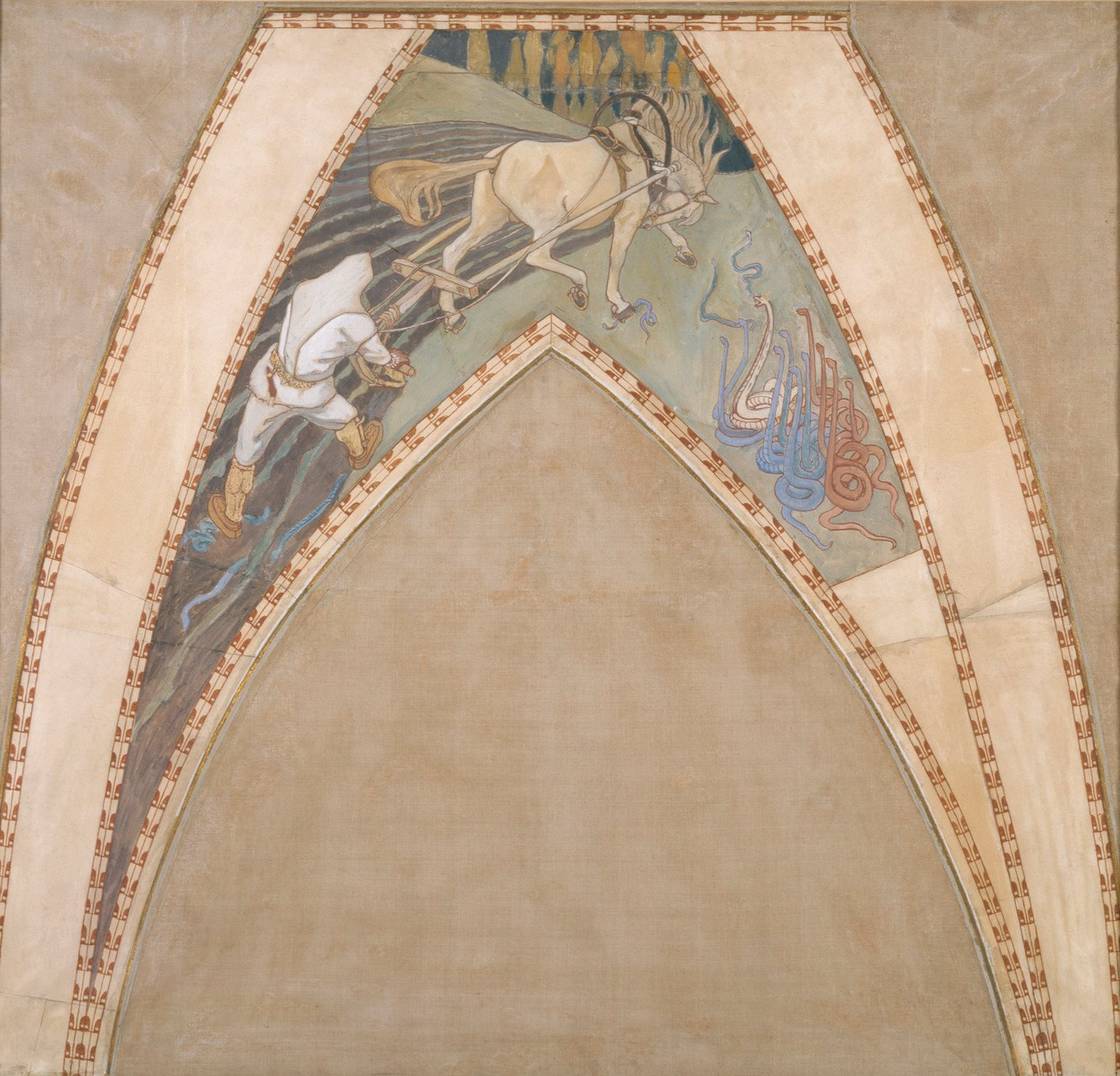
Sketch for the 1900 Exposition fresco Ilmarinen Plowing the Field of Vipers, 1899

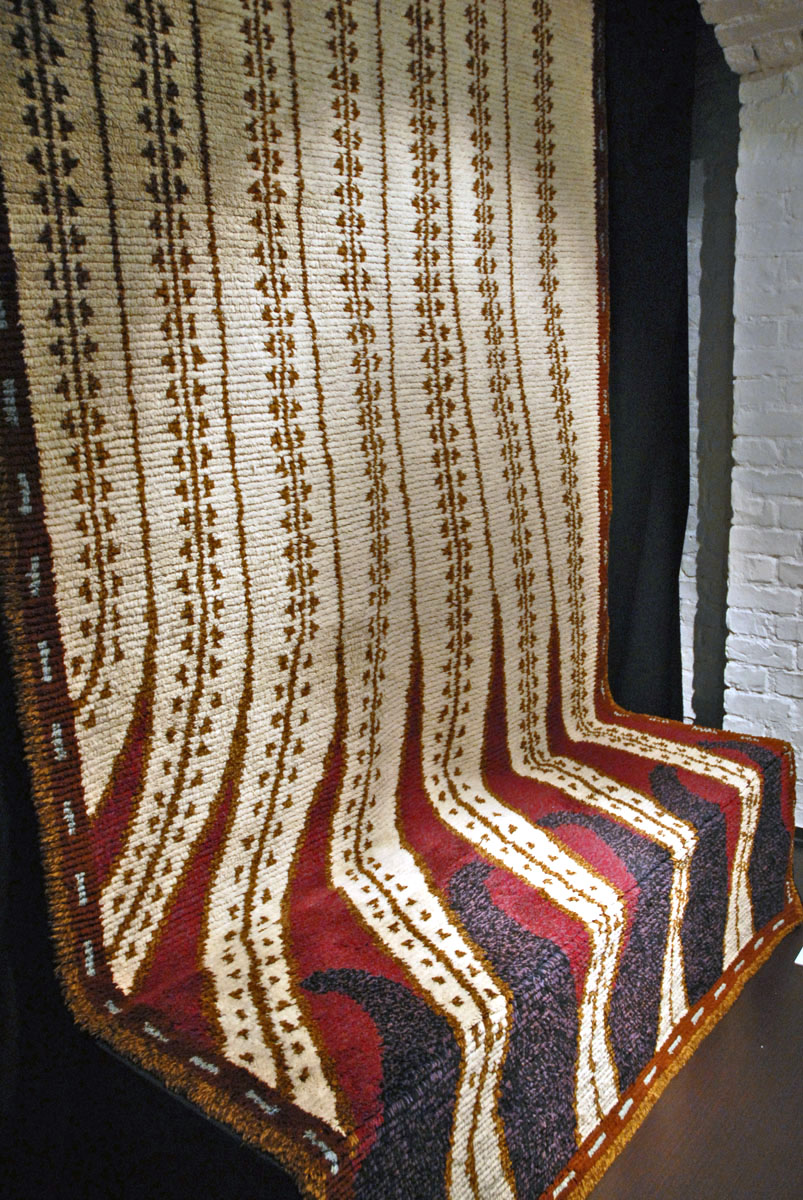
Liekki ryijy, designed by Gallen-Kallela

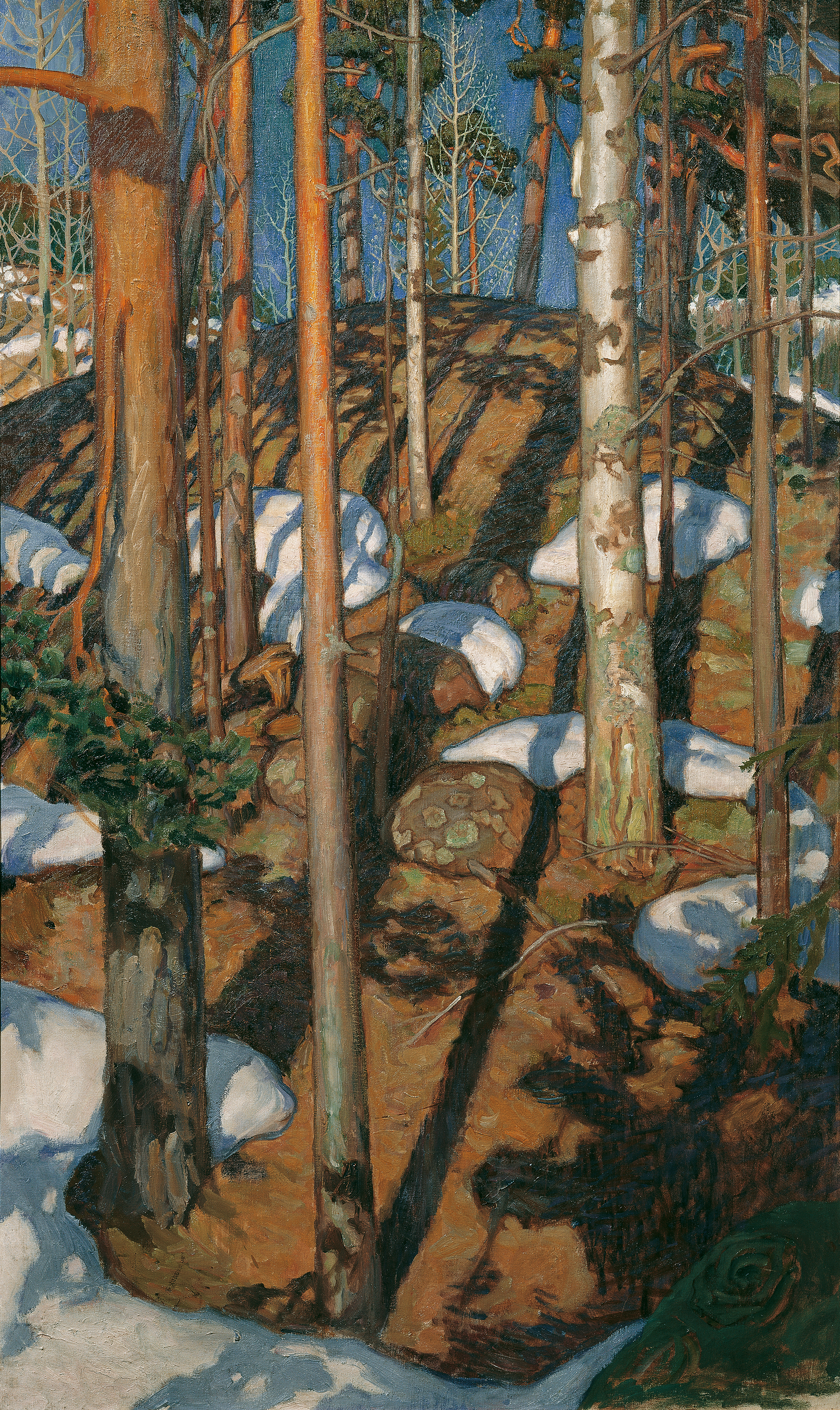
Spring, c. 1900
(Note: There is also a Jusélius Mausoleum fresco called Spring from 1903.)

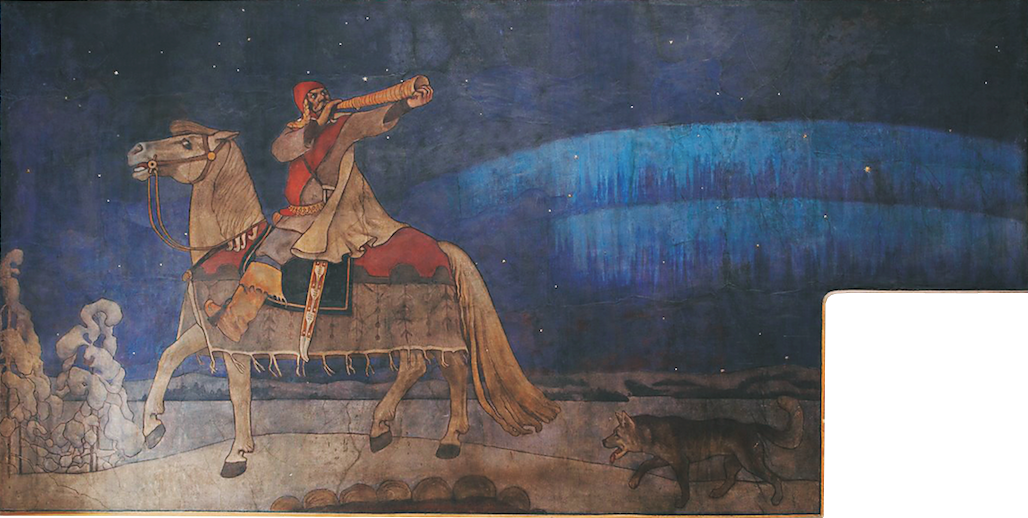
Kullervo Sets Off for War, 1901, large mural at Old Student House

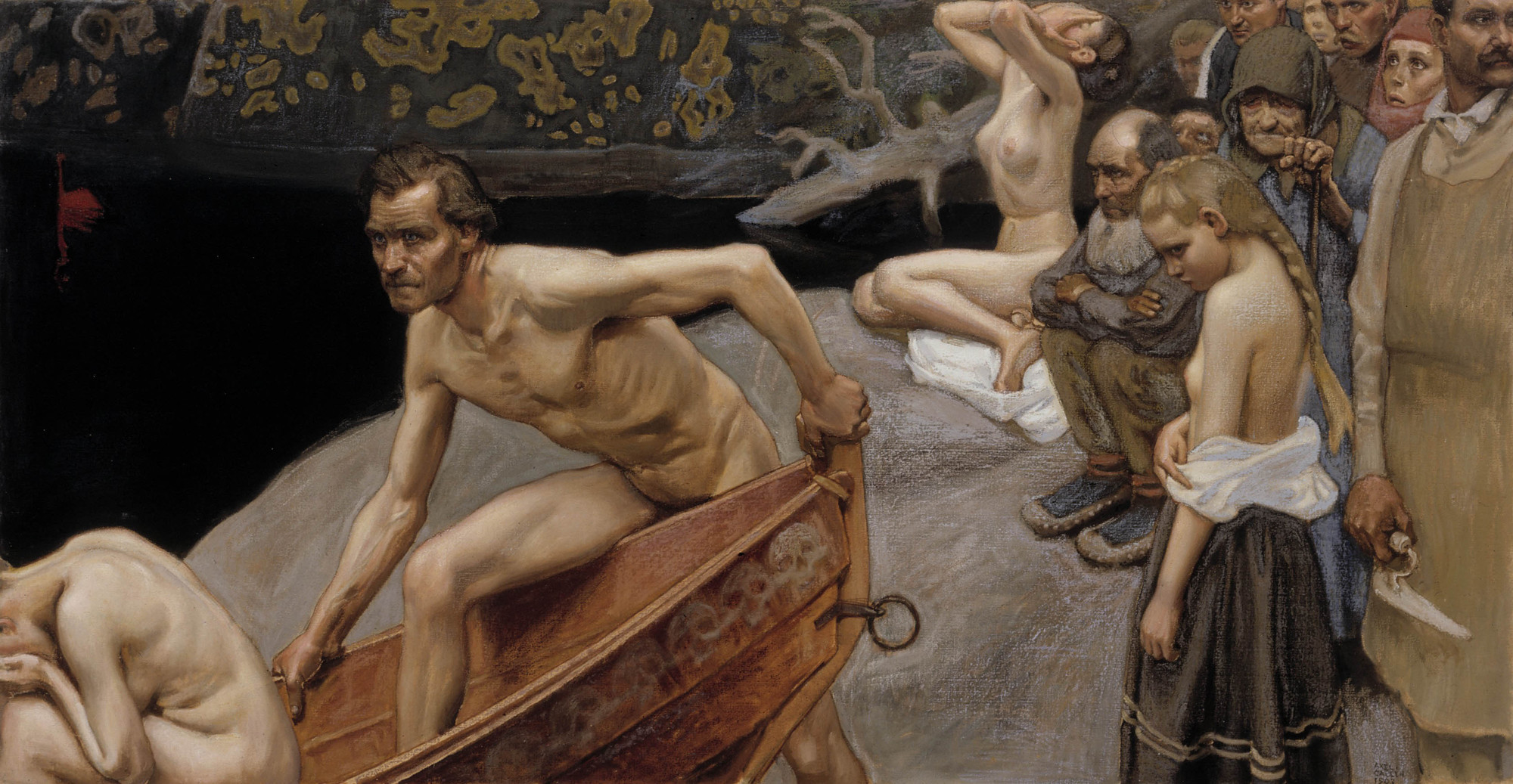
By the River of Tuonela, study for the Jusélius Mausoleum frescos, 1903 (fi)

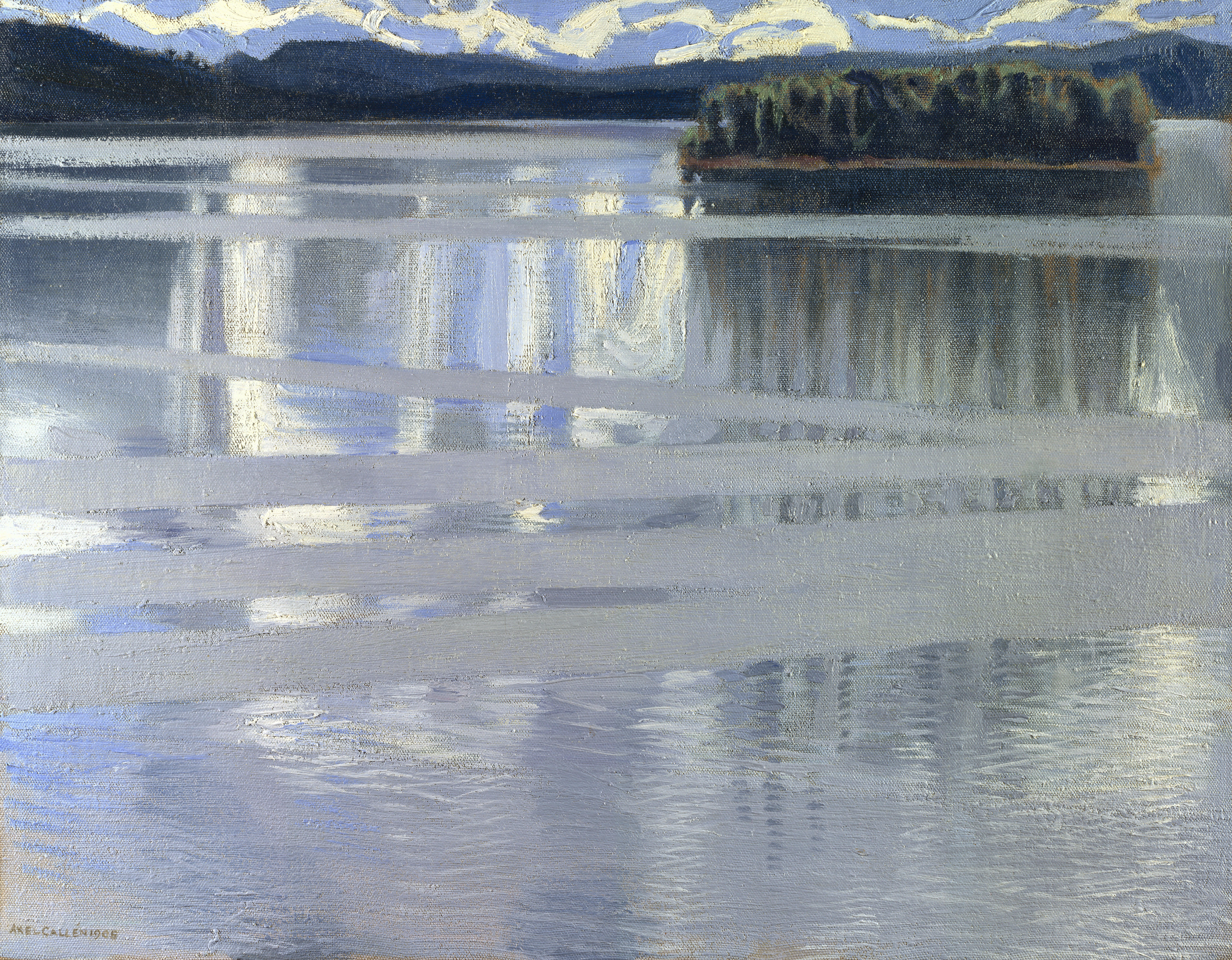
Lake Keitele, 1905 (fi)

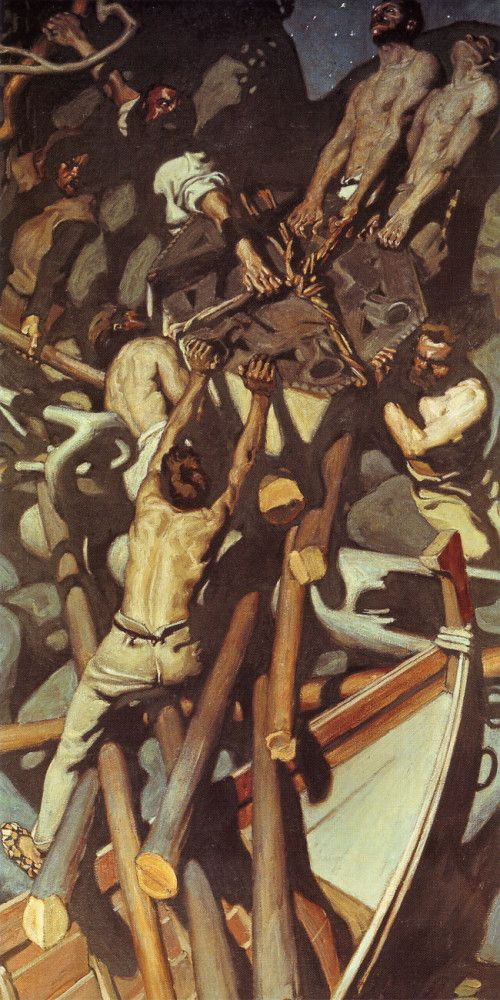
The Theft of the Sampo, 1905 (fi)

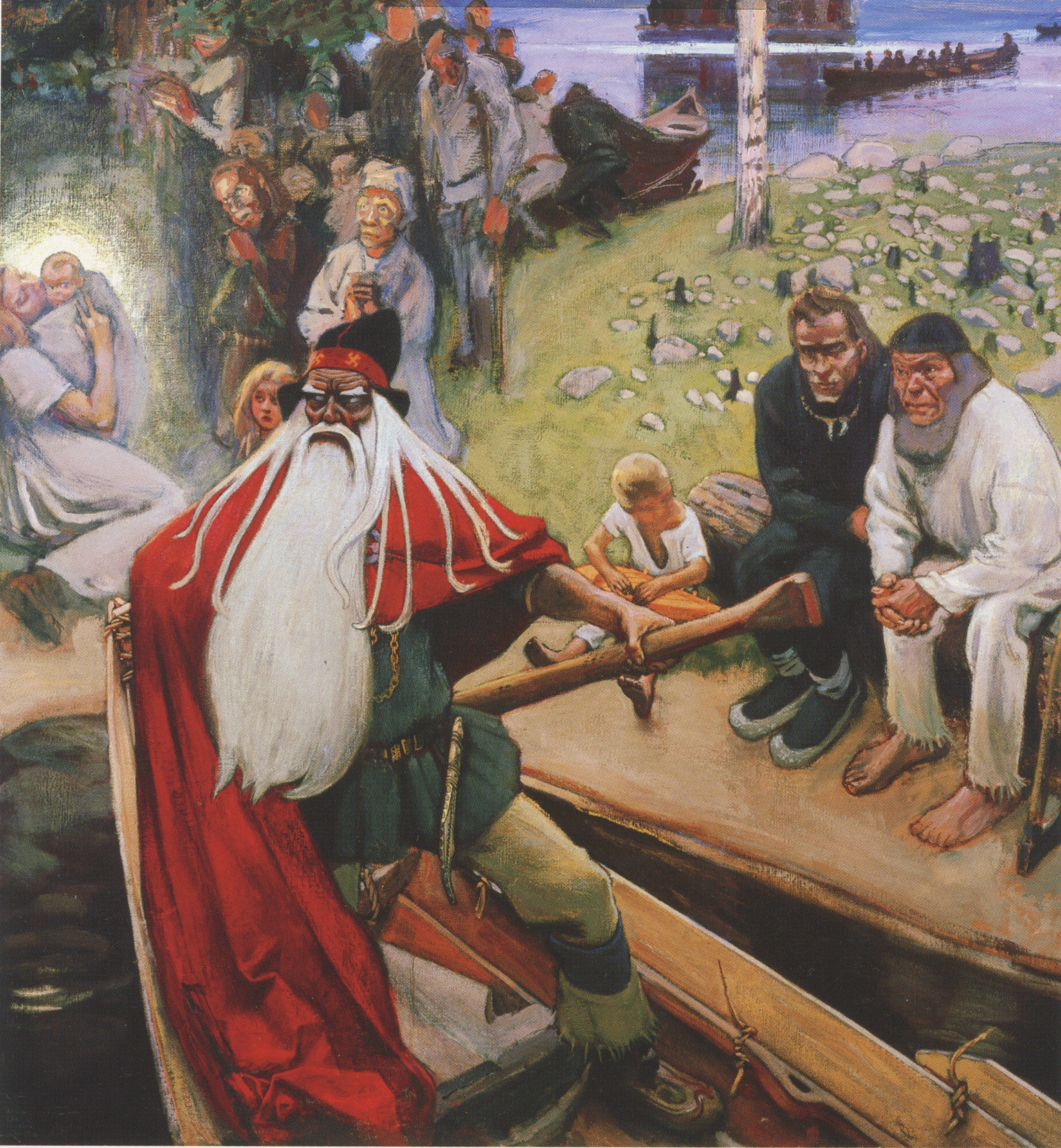
The Departure of Väinämöinen, 1906 (fi)

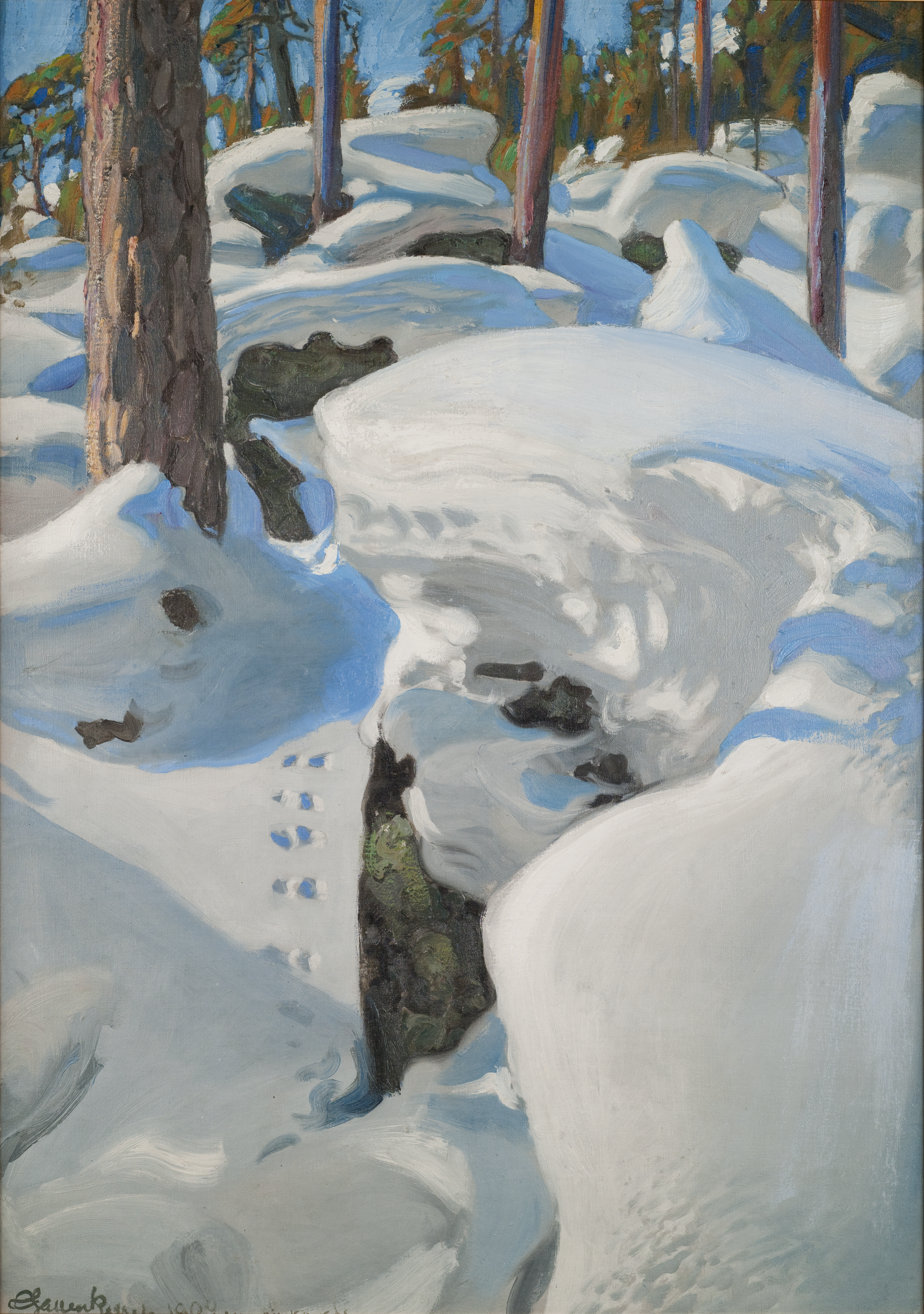
The Lair of the Lynx, 1906

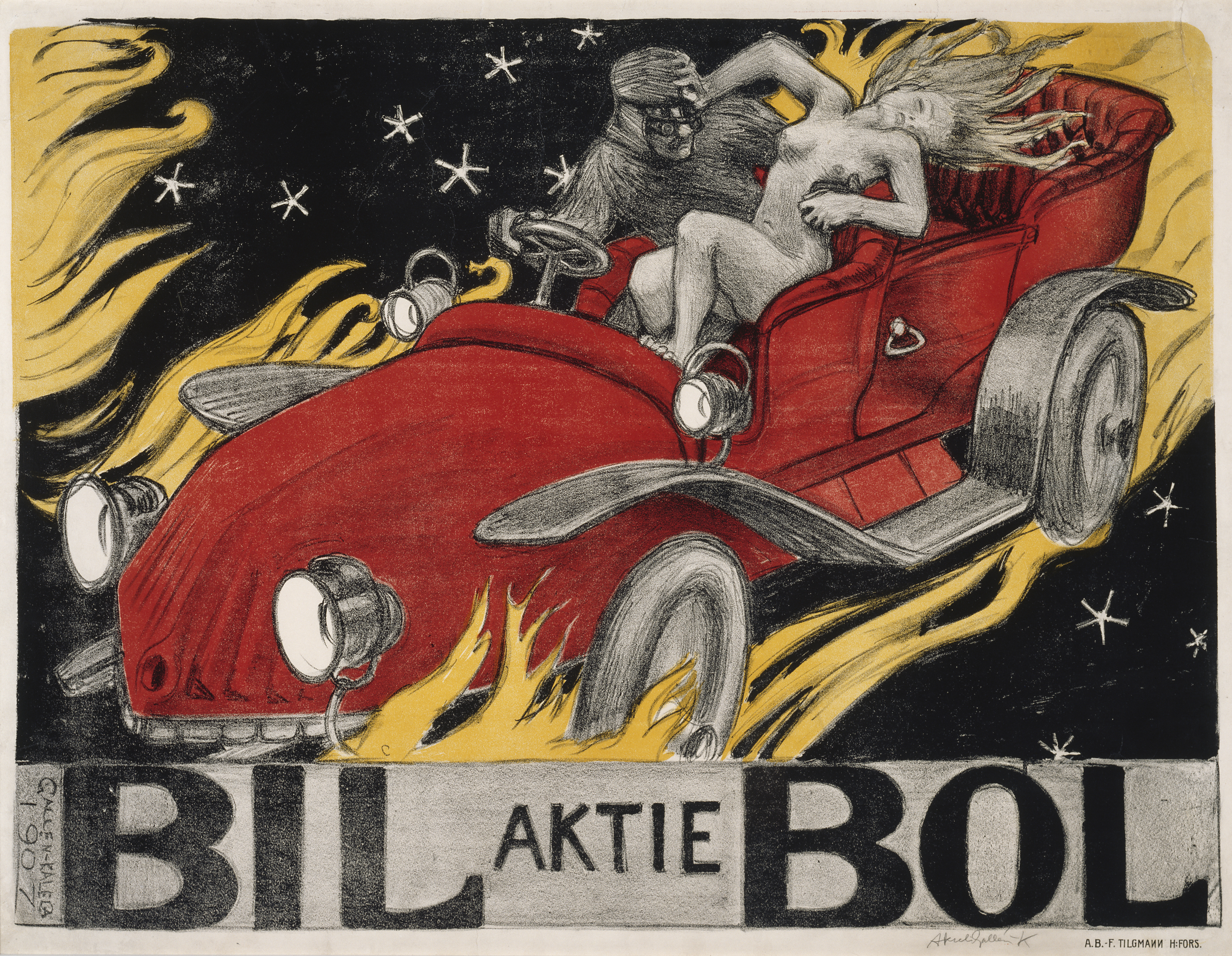
Bil-Bol, Poster for an Automobile Retailer, 1907

=== Africa and Tarvaspää ===
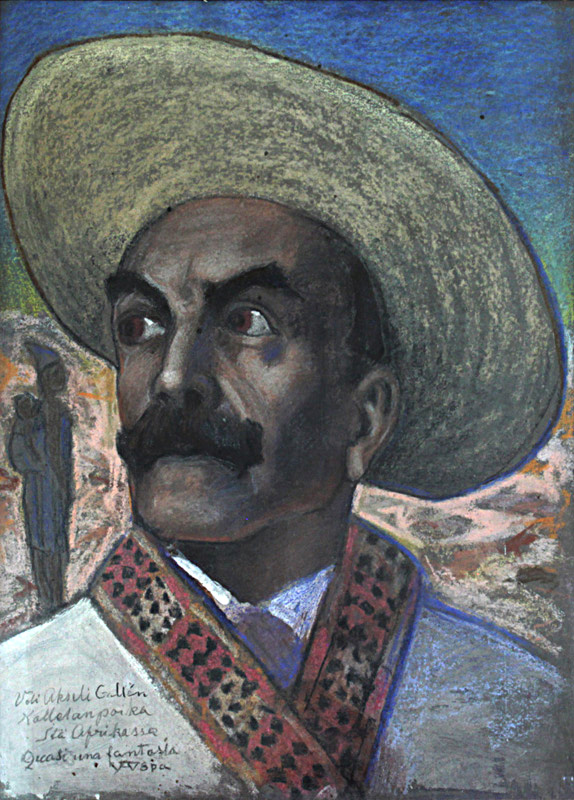
Akseli Gallen-Kallela After Returning From Africa by Sigurd Wettenhovi-Aspa in 1911

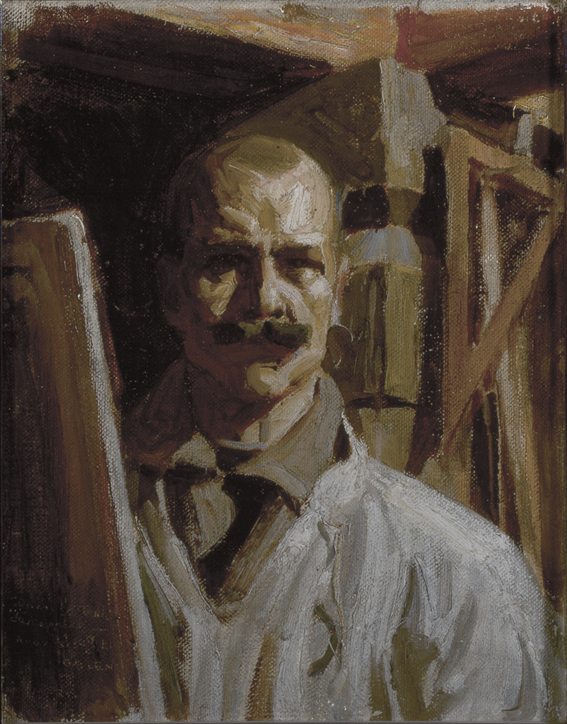
Self-Portrait for the Uffizi Gallery, 1916

In 1908, with renewal in mind, Gallen-Kallela and his family moved to Paris. However the city and the new direction art was being taken didn't feel as hospitable as he had hoped, and so in May 1909 they moved much further away to Nairobi in Kenya. He was the first Finnish artist to paint south of the Sahara, and produced over 150 expressionistic works. Although artistically the paintings are of fluctuating quality, their colors and the synergy of the colors are remarkable. They returned to Finland in February 1911. Based on this period, he later wrote and had published his Afrikka-kirja (Africa Book) in 1931. Between 1911 and 1913, he designed and built a studio and house for his family at Tarvaspää, approximately 10 km northwest of the centre of Helsinki.

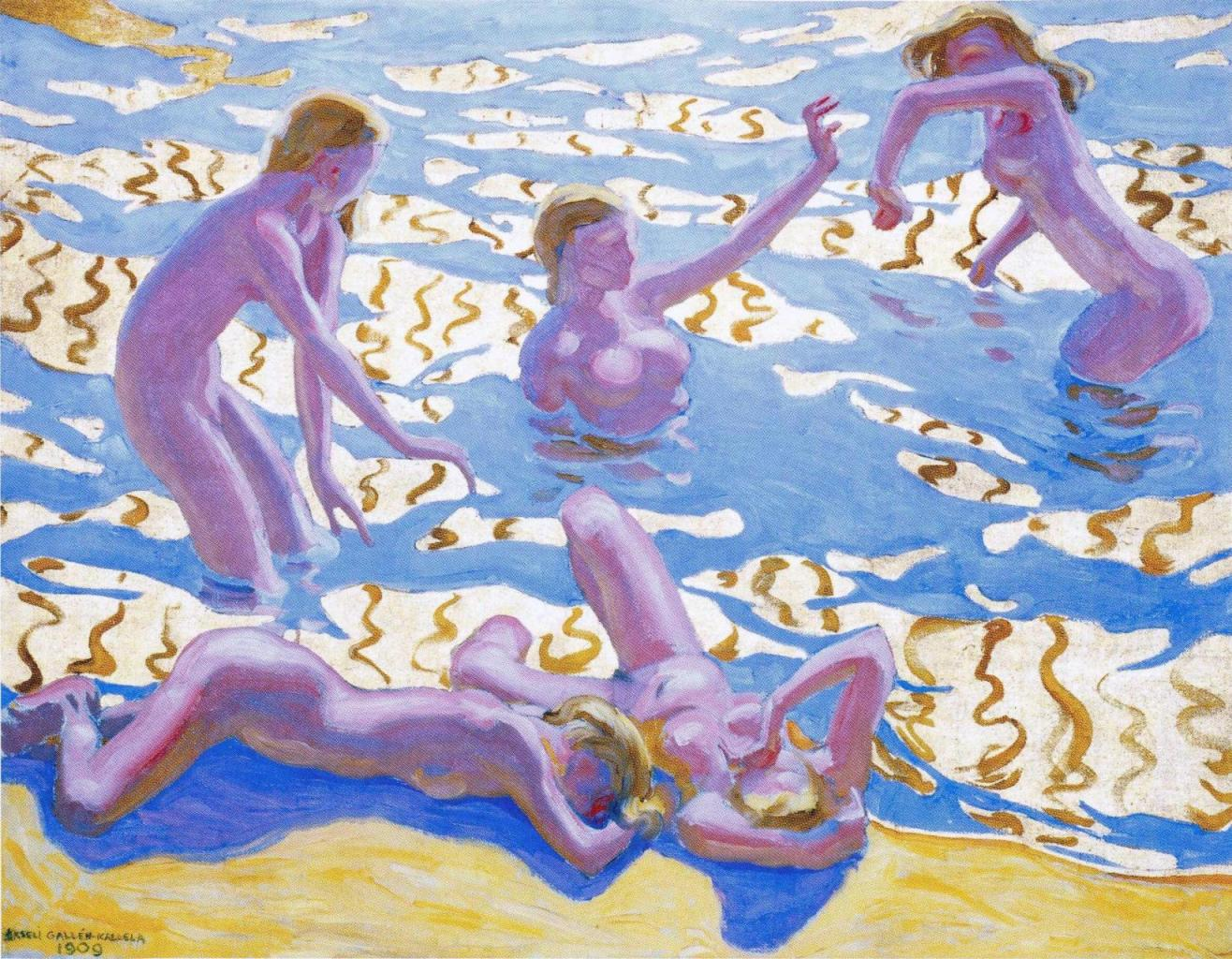
The Oceanides, 1909

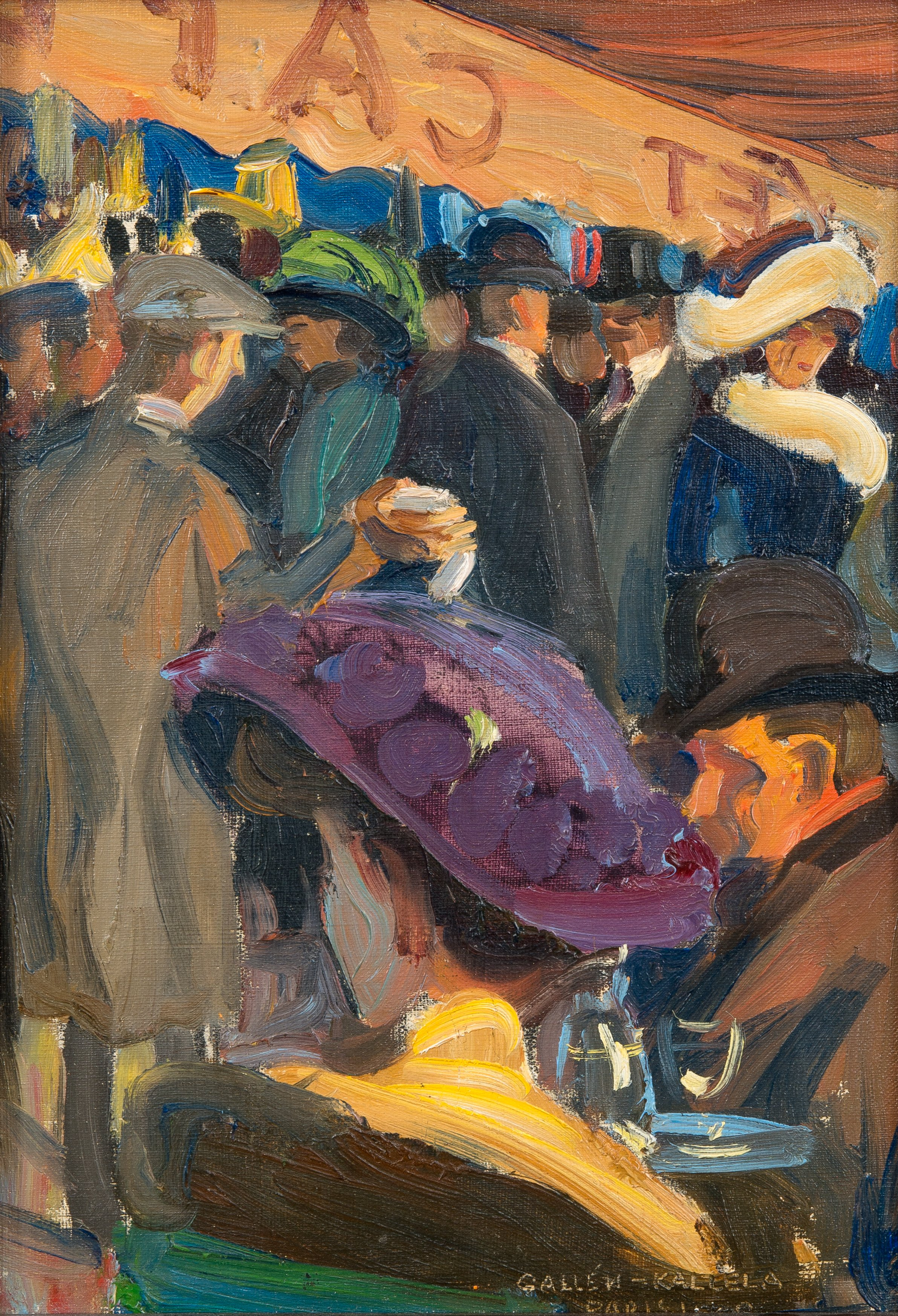
Café in Paris, 1909

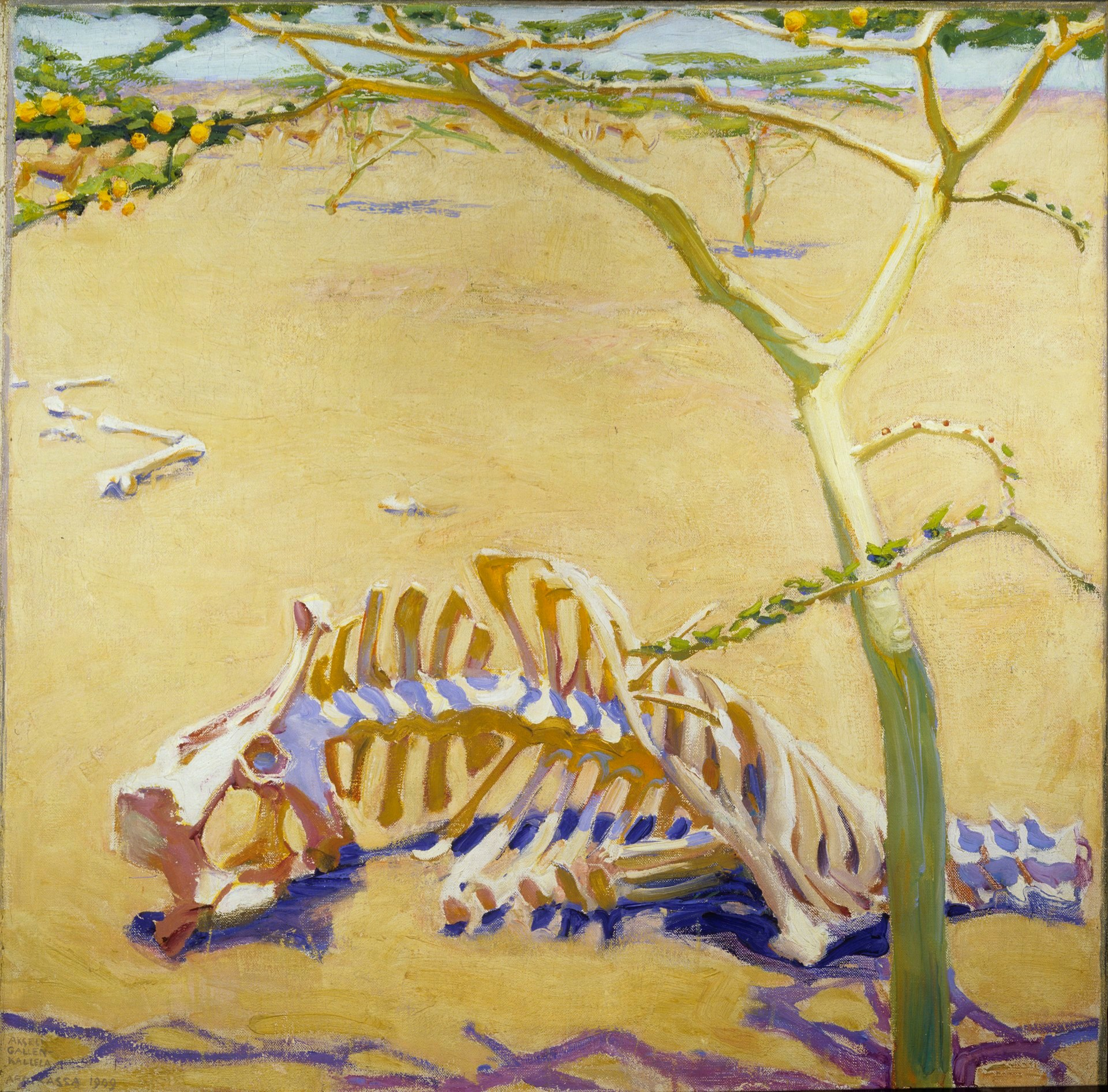
Skeleton of a Camel, 1909

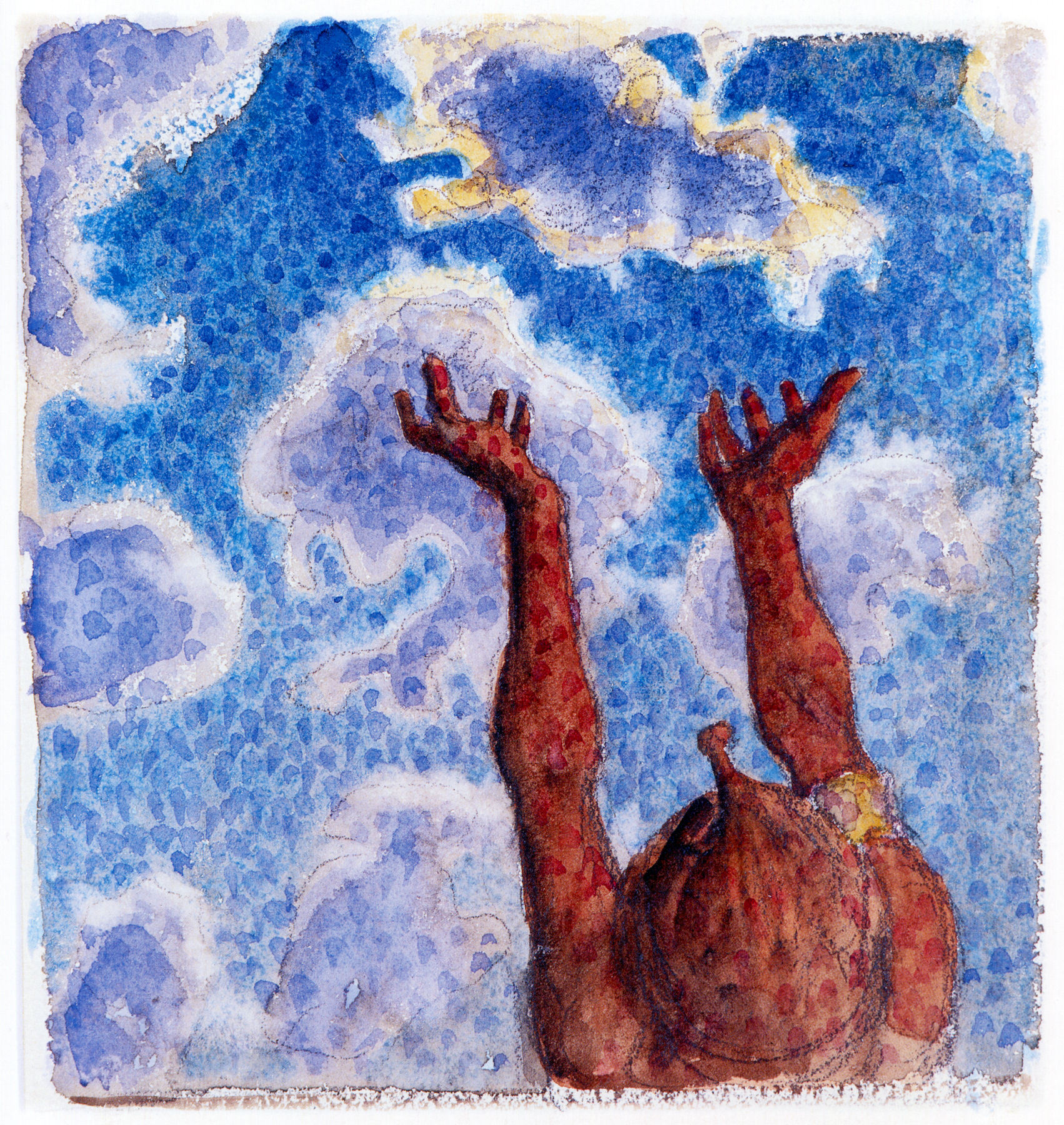
Untitled, 1909

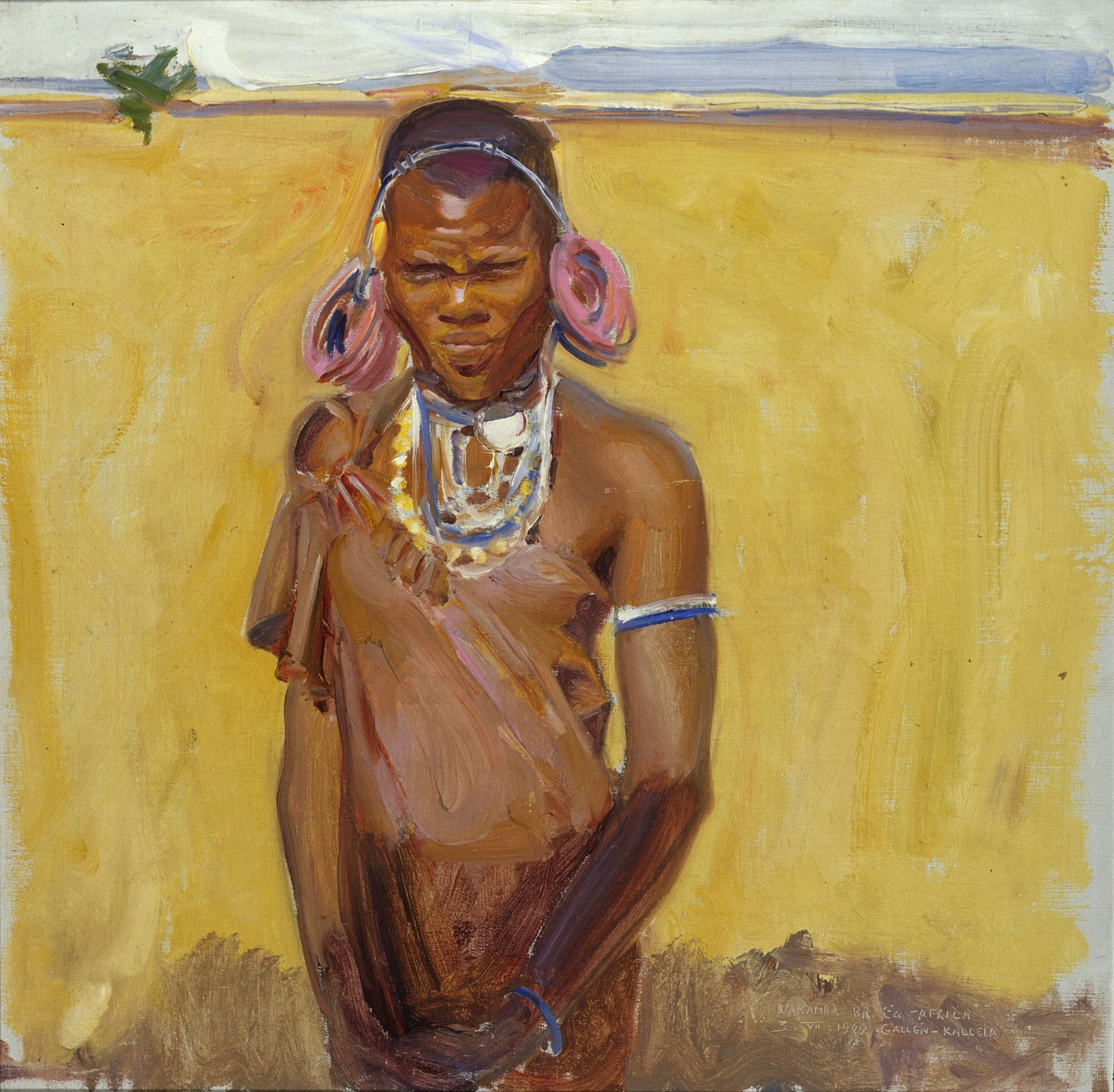
Kikuyu Woman, 1909

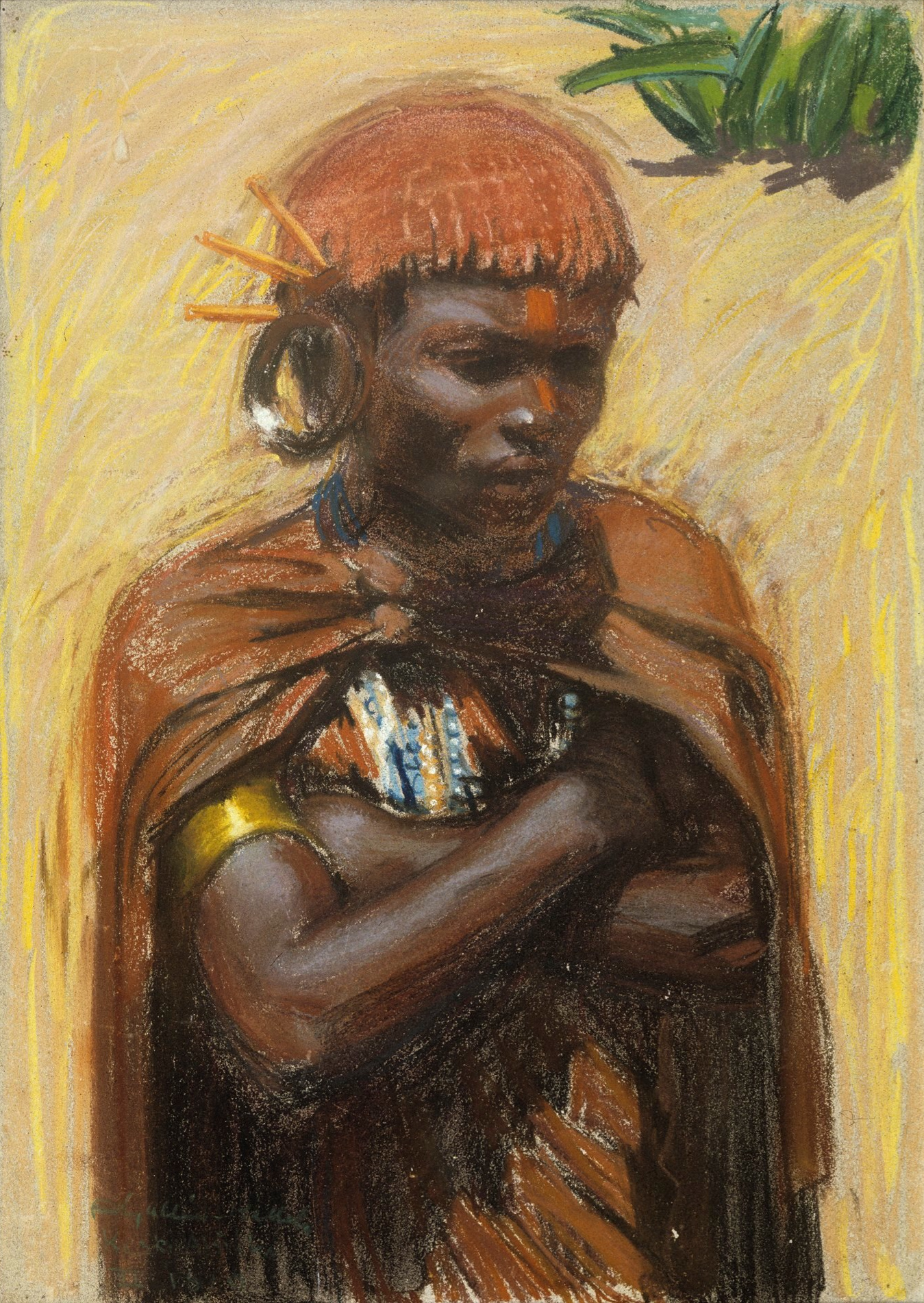
Portrait of Kenosua, 1909–1910
(Note: He was an aide and a friend to the Gallen-Kallela family and always escorted the family's children to school.)

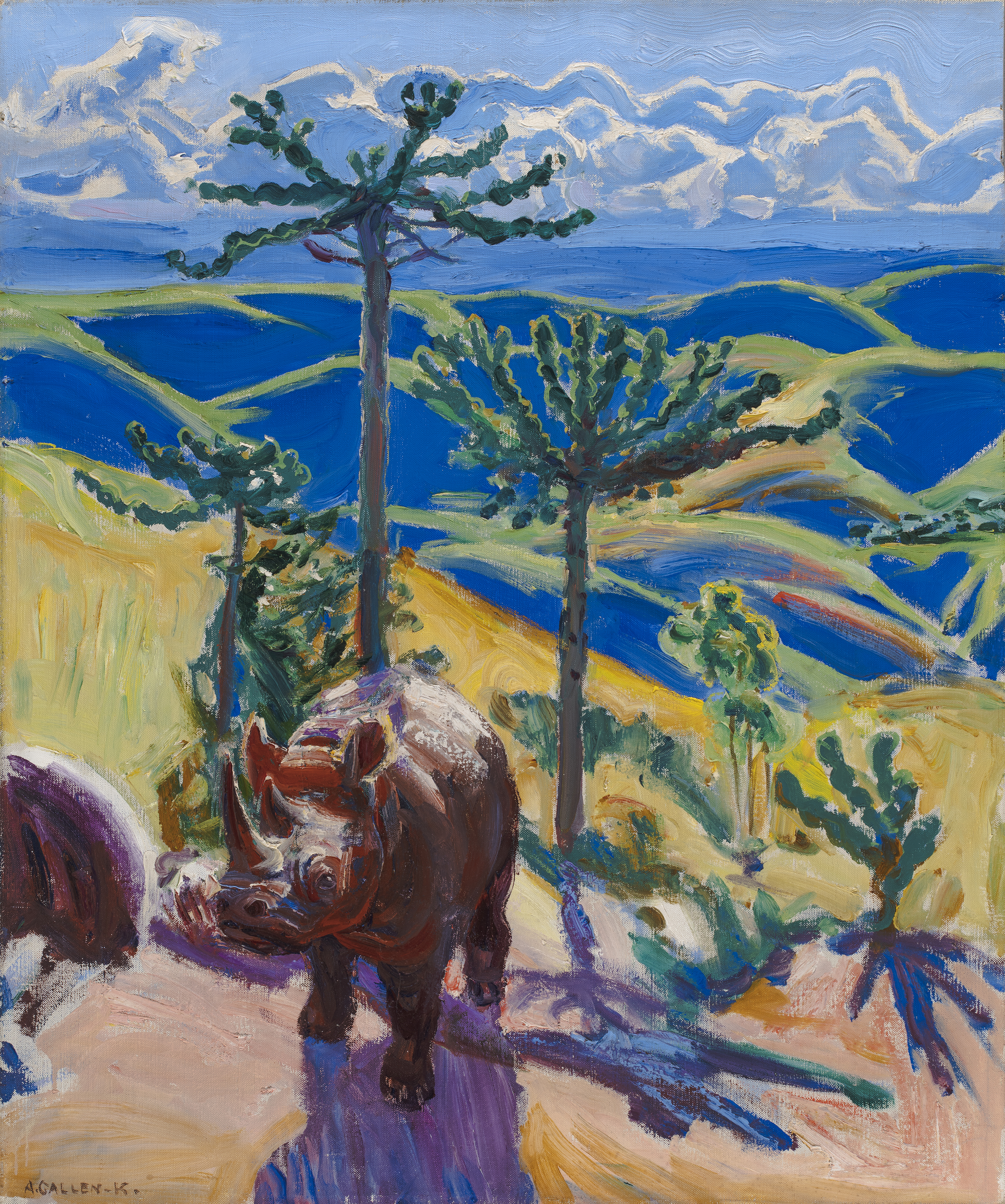
Rhinoceros and Euphorbia Trees, 1909–1910

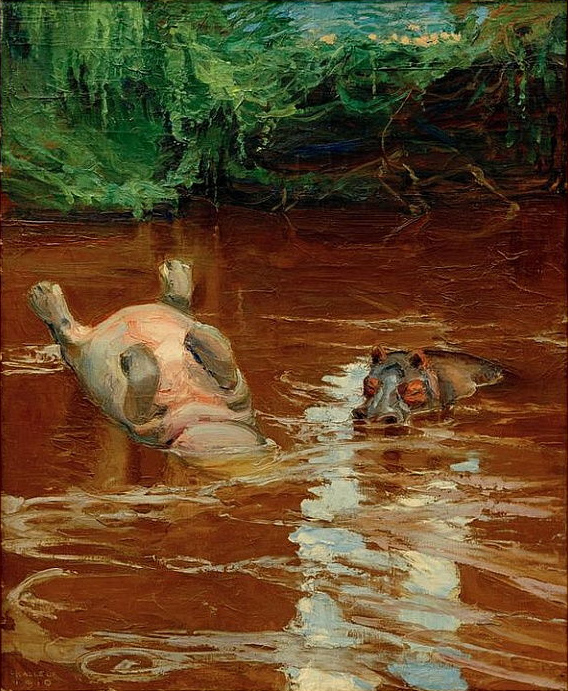
Hippos in the Tana River, 1910

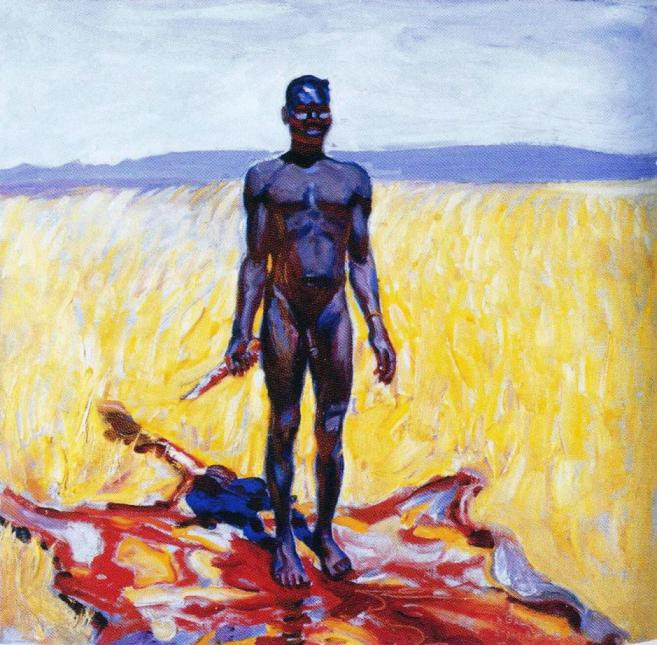
Homo Victor (Victorious Man), 1910

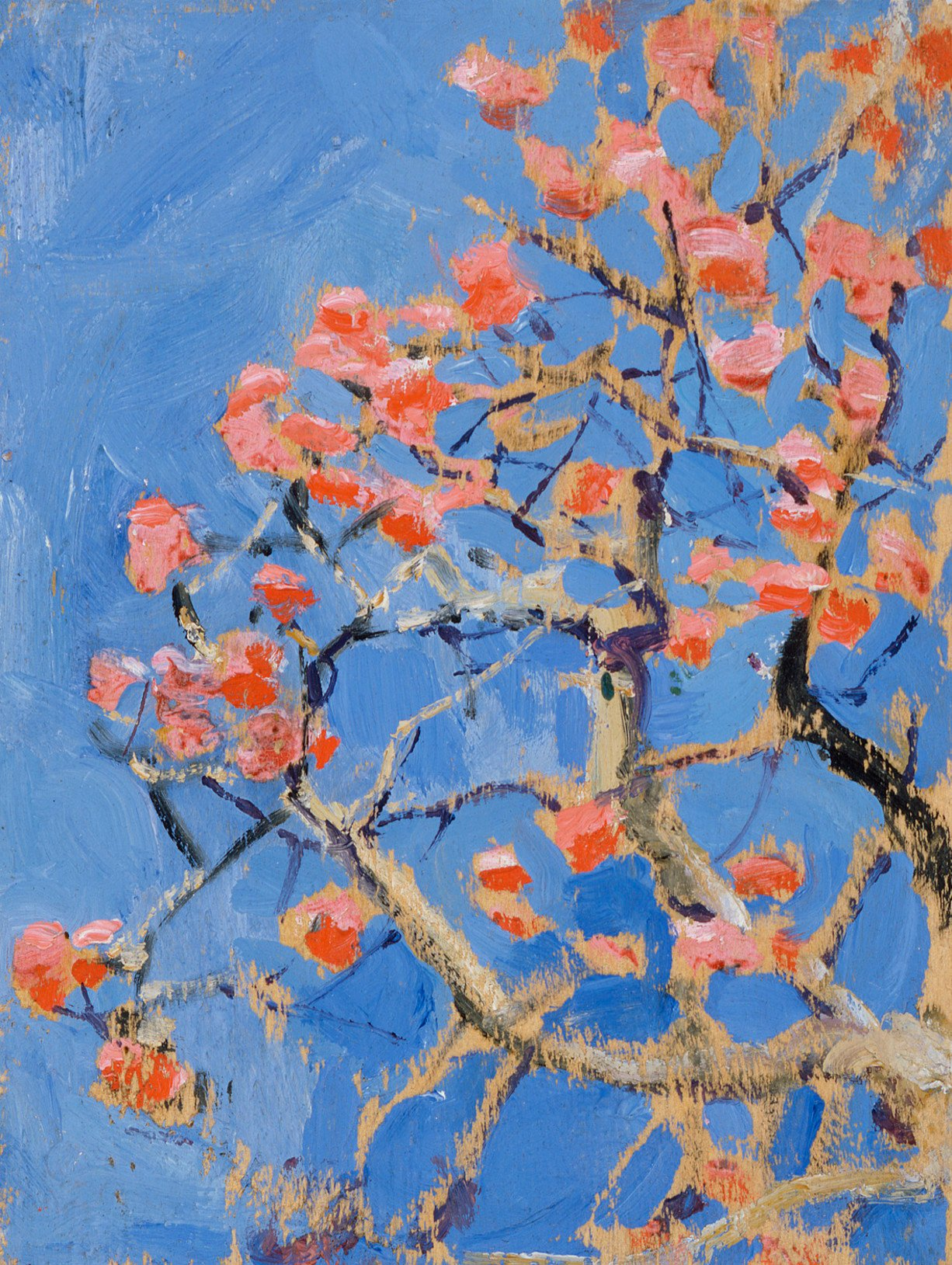
Coral Tree in Blossom, 1910

=== Independent Finland ===
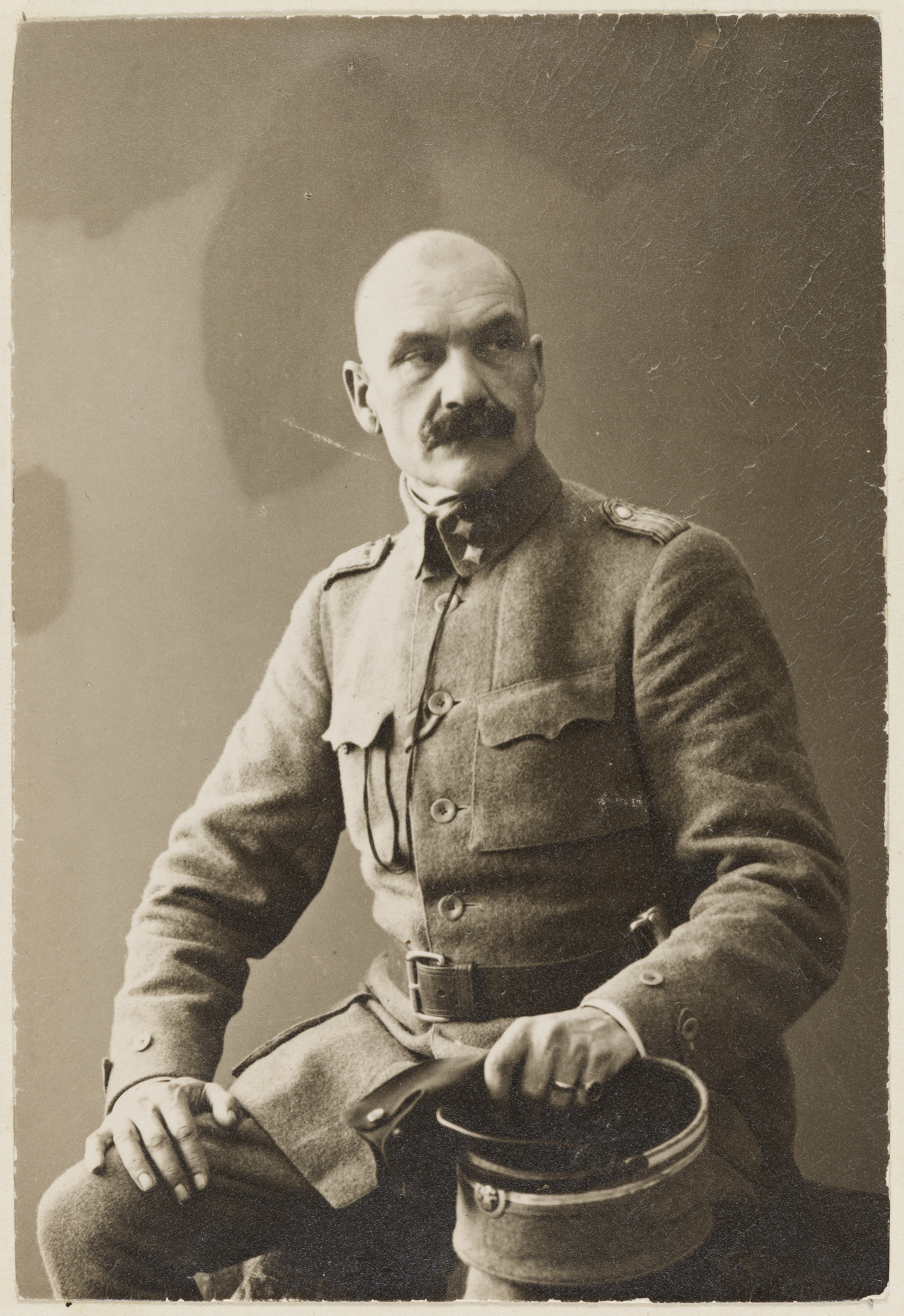
Gallen-Kallela in his lieutenant uniform during the civil war, 1918

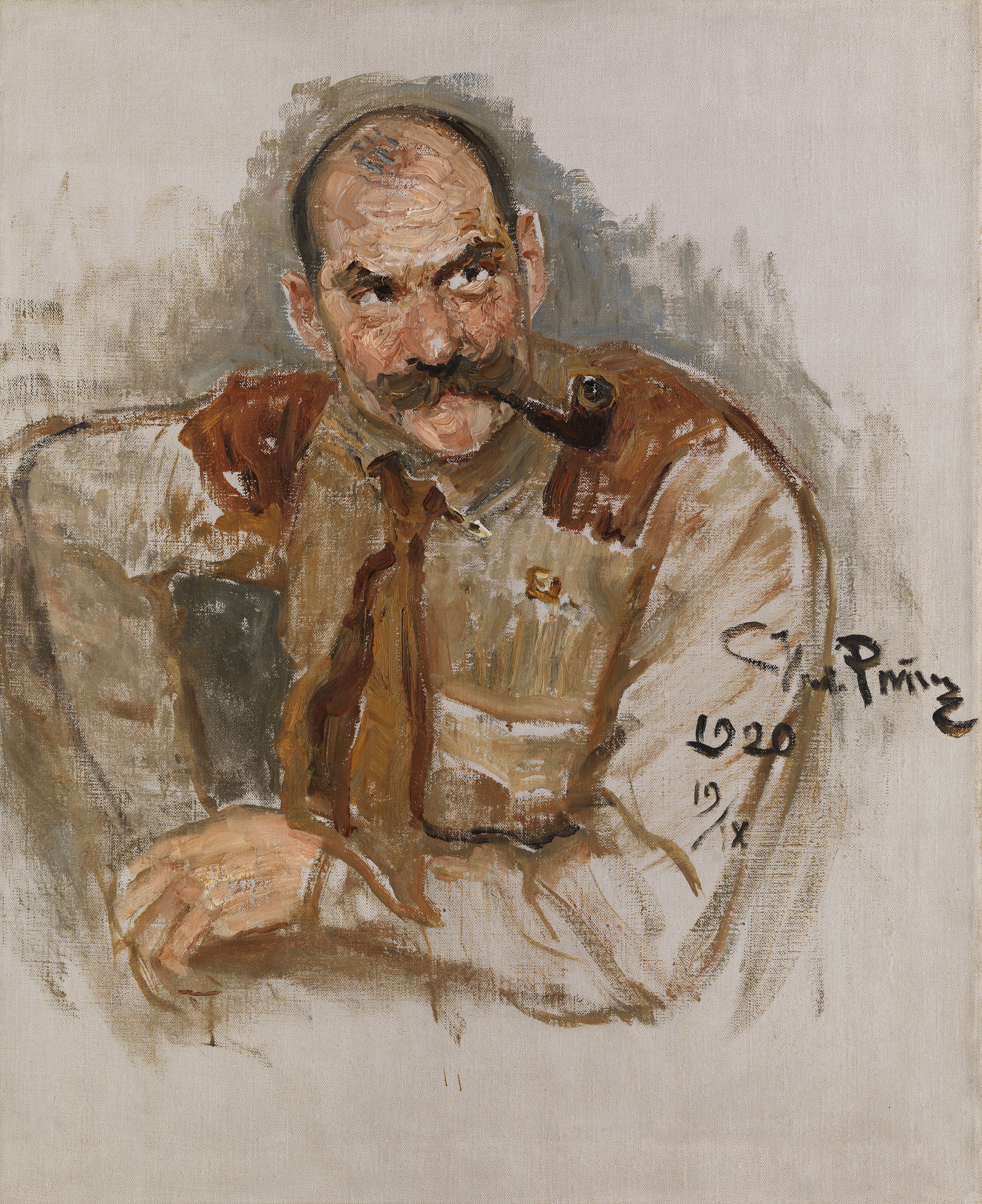
Portrait of A. Gallen-Kallela, Ilya Repin, 1920

The family moved back from Tarvaspää to Kalela in 1915 to escape the turmoil of the First World War. In 1918, Gallen-Kallela and his son Jorma took part in the fighting at the front of the Finnish Civil War. When the regent, General Mannerheim, heard about that, he invited Gallen-Kallela to design the flags, official decorations and uniforms for the newly independent Finland. For the flag, Gallen-Kallela proposed a white-blue cross flag, with colors inverted (white cross on blue), but it was considered too similar to the Swedish flag and particularly the era's Greek flag. In 1919, he was appointed aide-de-camp to Mannerheim. In 1920, he made an agreement with the publishing company WSOY for the eventual publication of Great Kalevala, with the less decorative Koru-Kalevala being published first in 1922. He was granted a professorship in 1919, and from 1919 to 1931 he was the Vice-Chairman of the Kalevala Society.

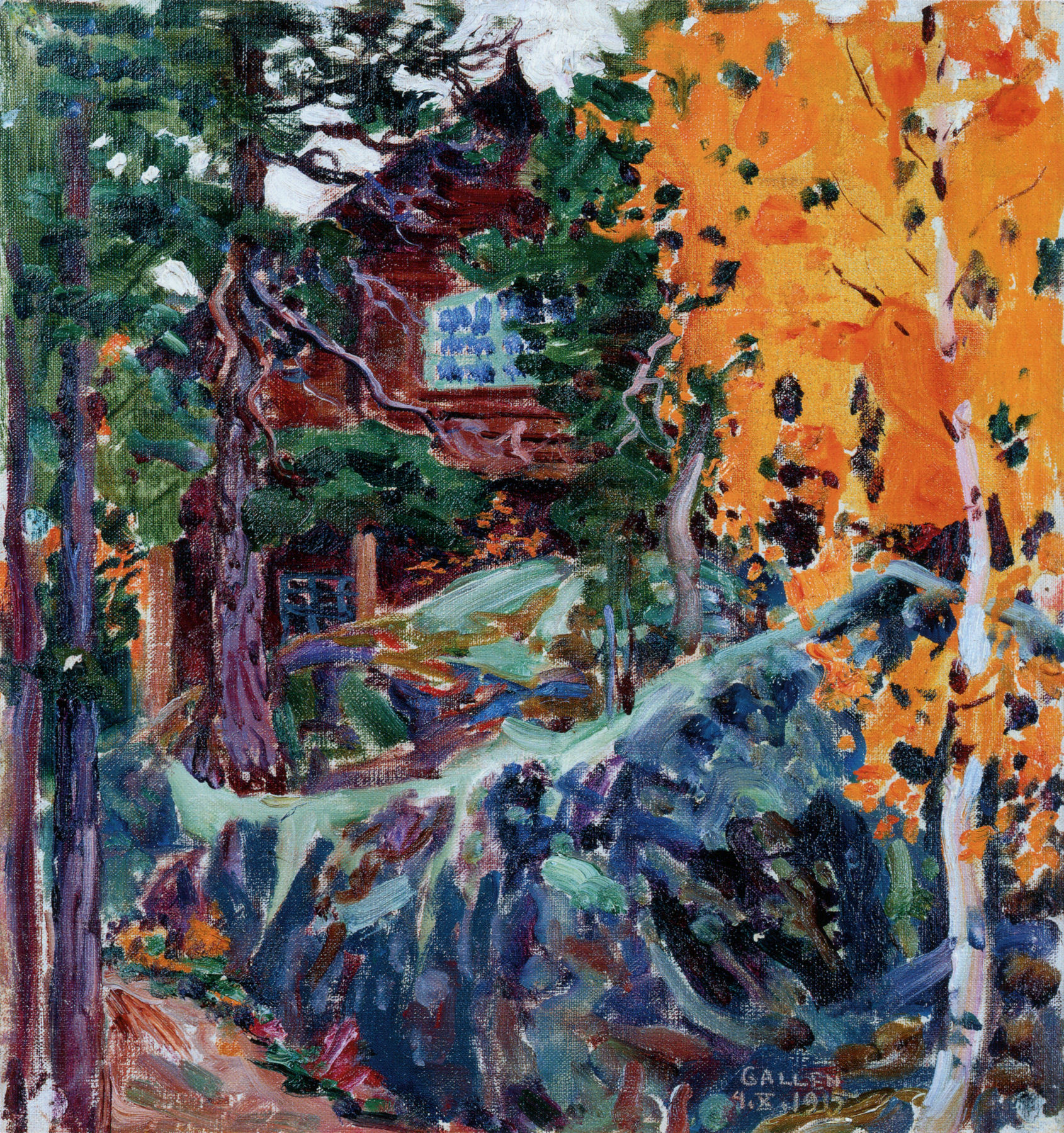
Kalela in Autumn, 1915

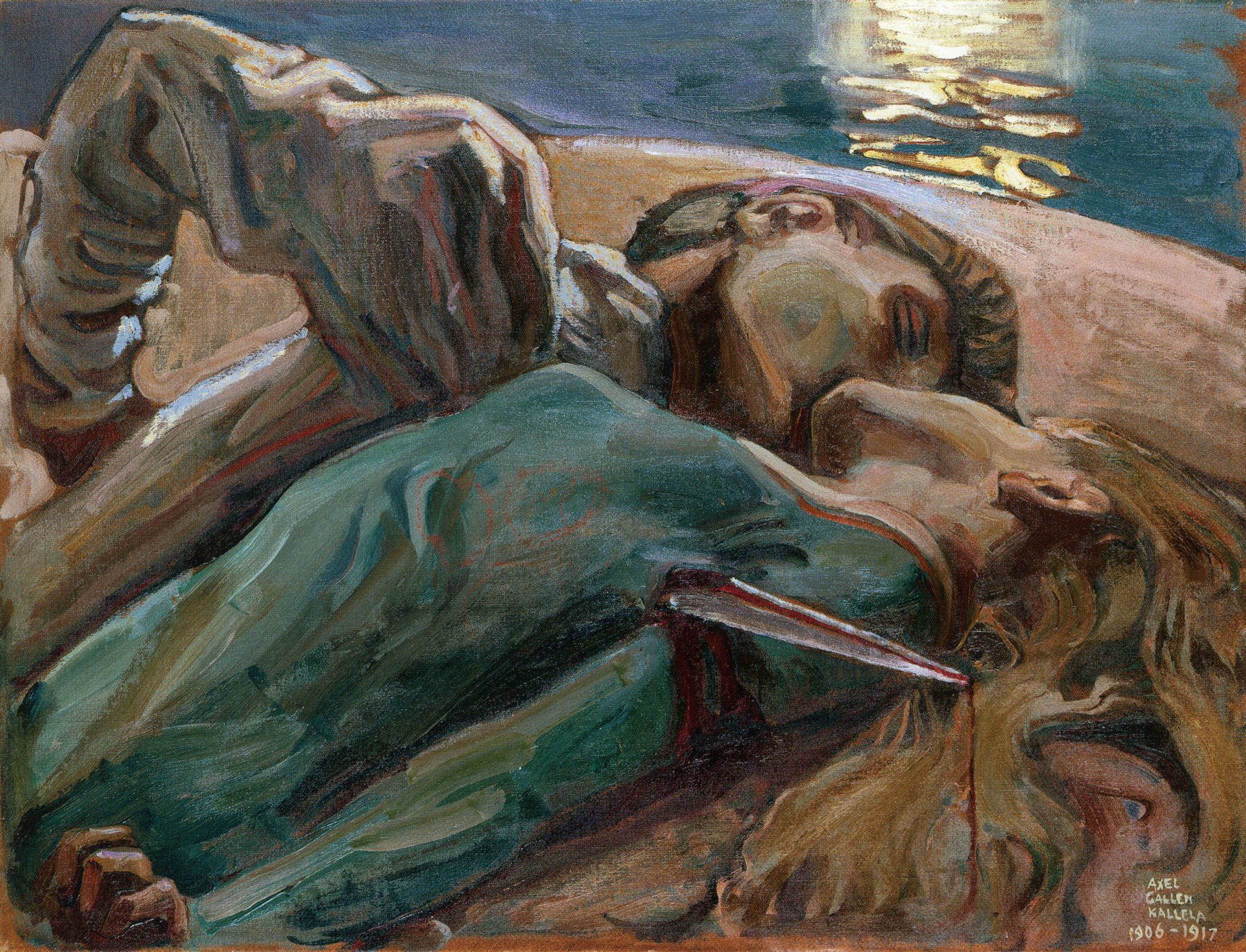
The Lovers, 1906–1917

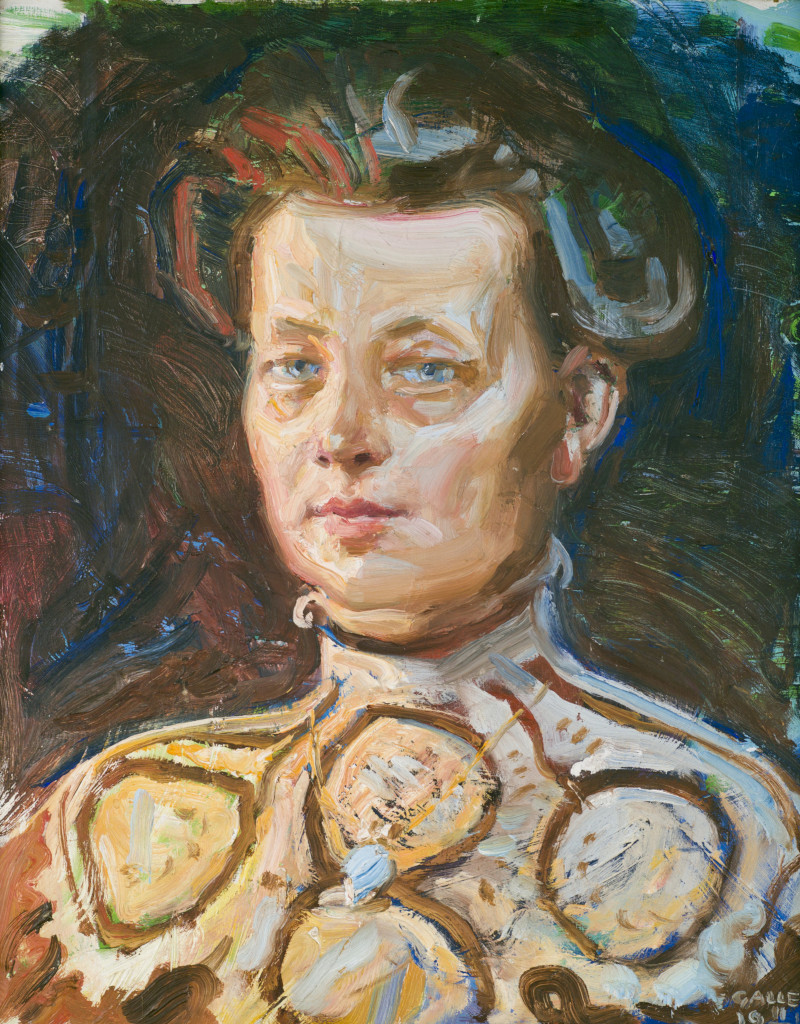
Portrait of Mary, 1917

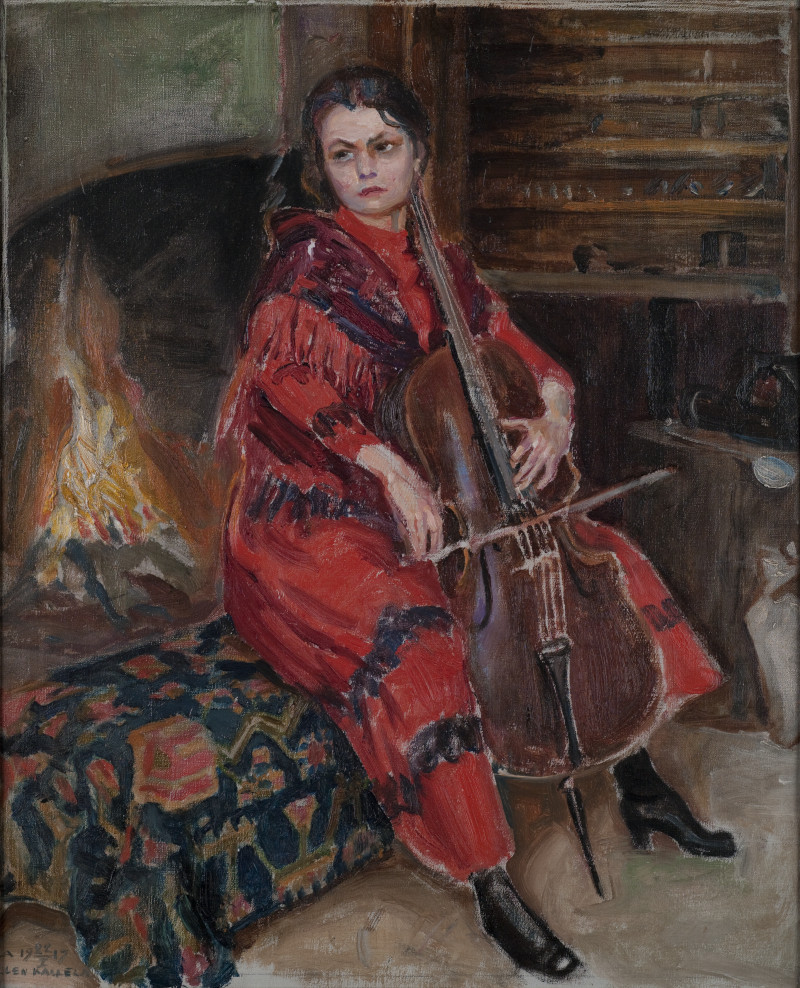
Kirsti Playing the Cello, 1917

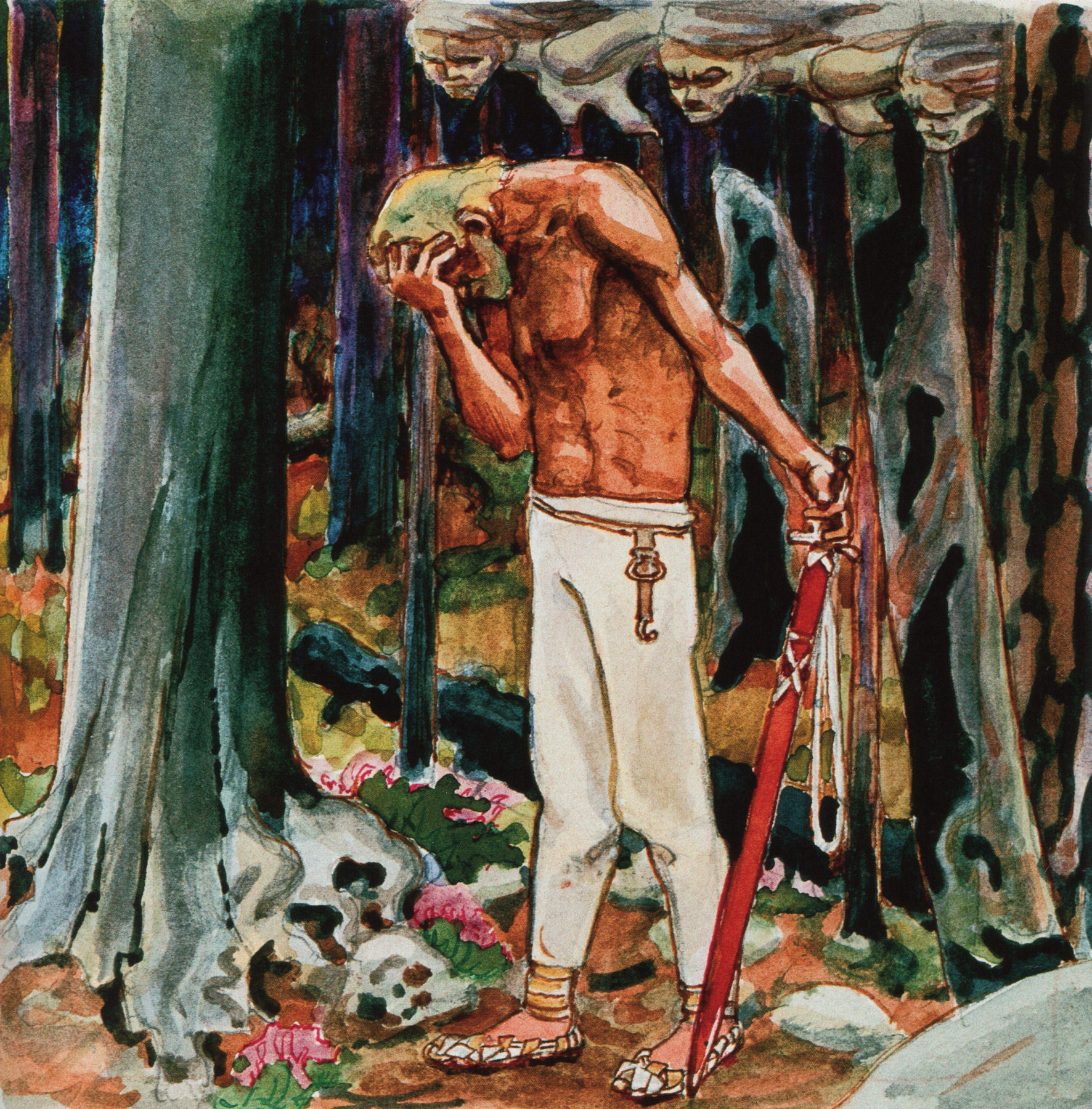
Regretful Kullervo, 1918

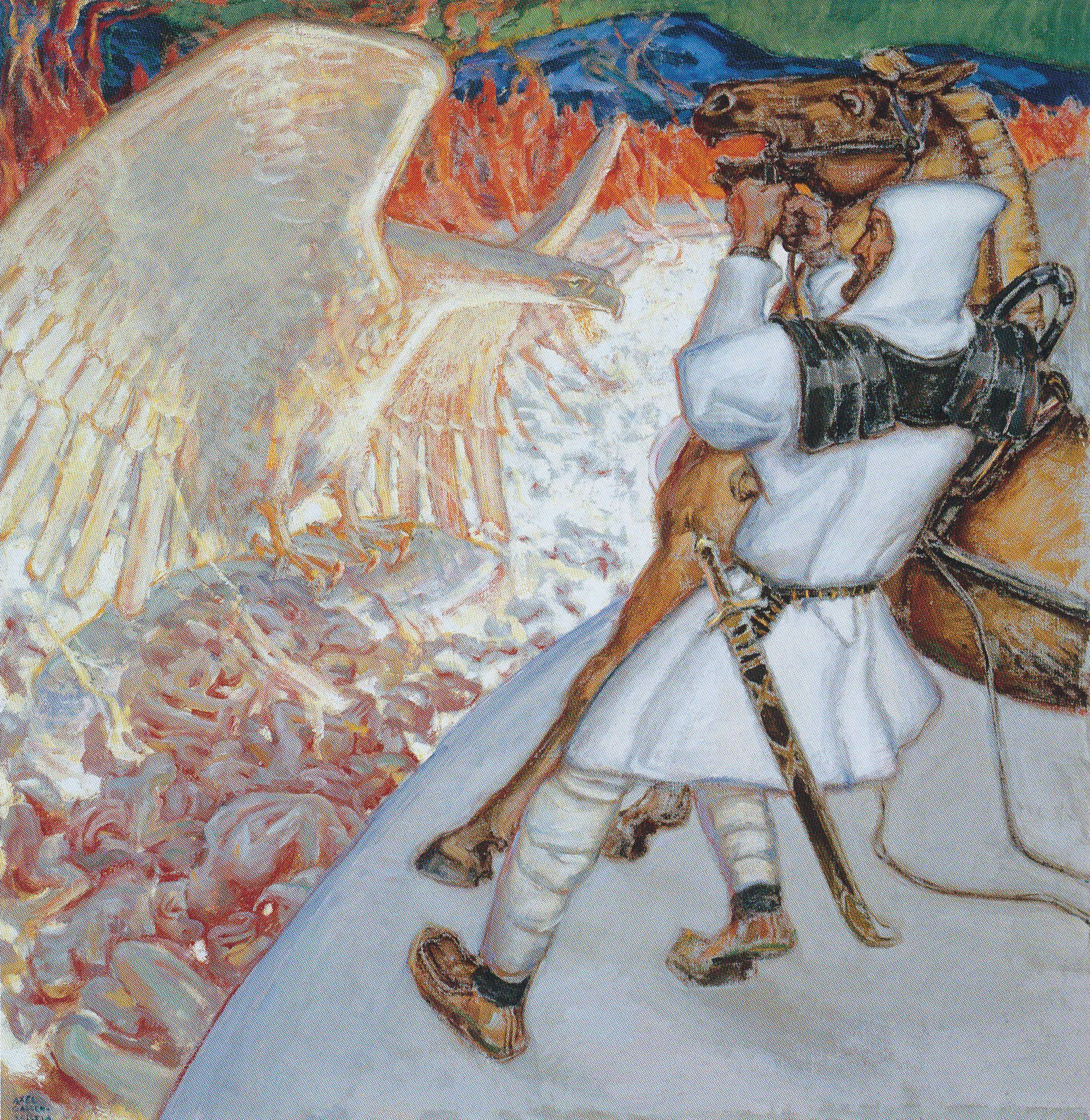
Lemminkäinen by the River of Fire, 1920

=== New Mexico, later life, and death ===
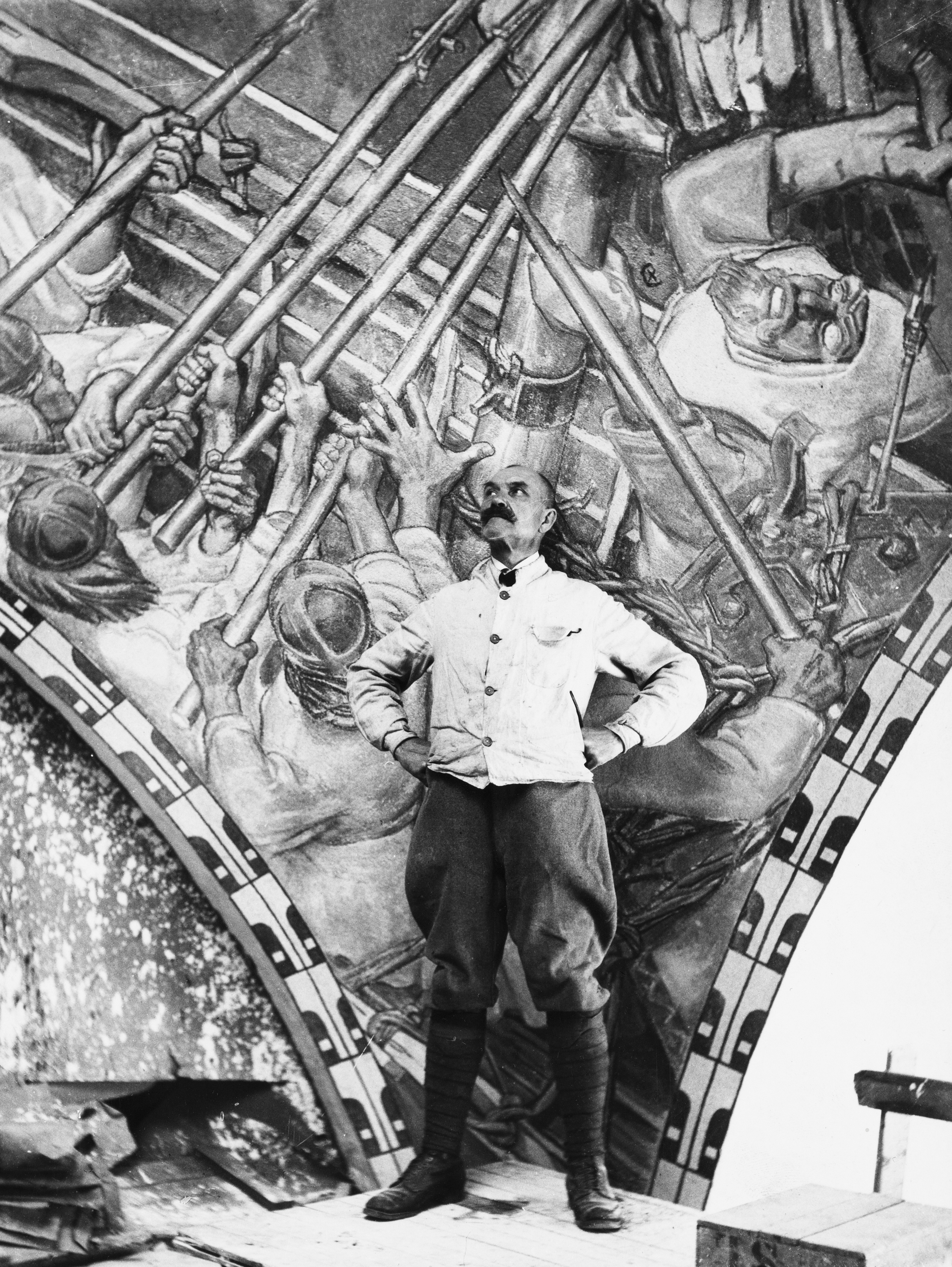
Gallen-Kallela in the National Museum of Finland in front of his fresco version of The Defense of the Sampo, 1928

In December 1923, he moved to the United States, where his family followed him in autumn 1924. He first spent time in Chicago, and an exhibition of his work toured several cities. In Chicago, he was impressed by Native American art and moved to Taos, New Mexico, at the art colony there to study it further. During his time in the United States, he began sketching out the Great Kalevala in much more detail. In May 1926, the family returned to Finland. In 1924, Gallen-Kallela had published Kallela-kirja. 1. Iltapuhde-jutelmia, which was translated into Swedish by Bertel Gripenberg in 1932. In 1928, together with his son Jorma he painted the Kalevala frescoes at the lobby of the National Museum of Finland. In 1930, he made an agreement to paint a gigantic fresco for the bank Kansallis-Osake-Pankki, but on 7 March 1931, while returning from a lecture in Copenhagen, he suddenly died of pneumonia in Stockholm.

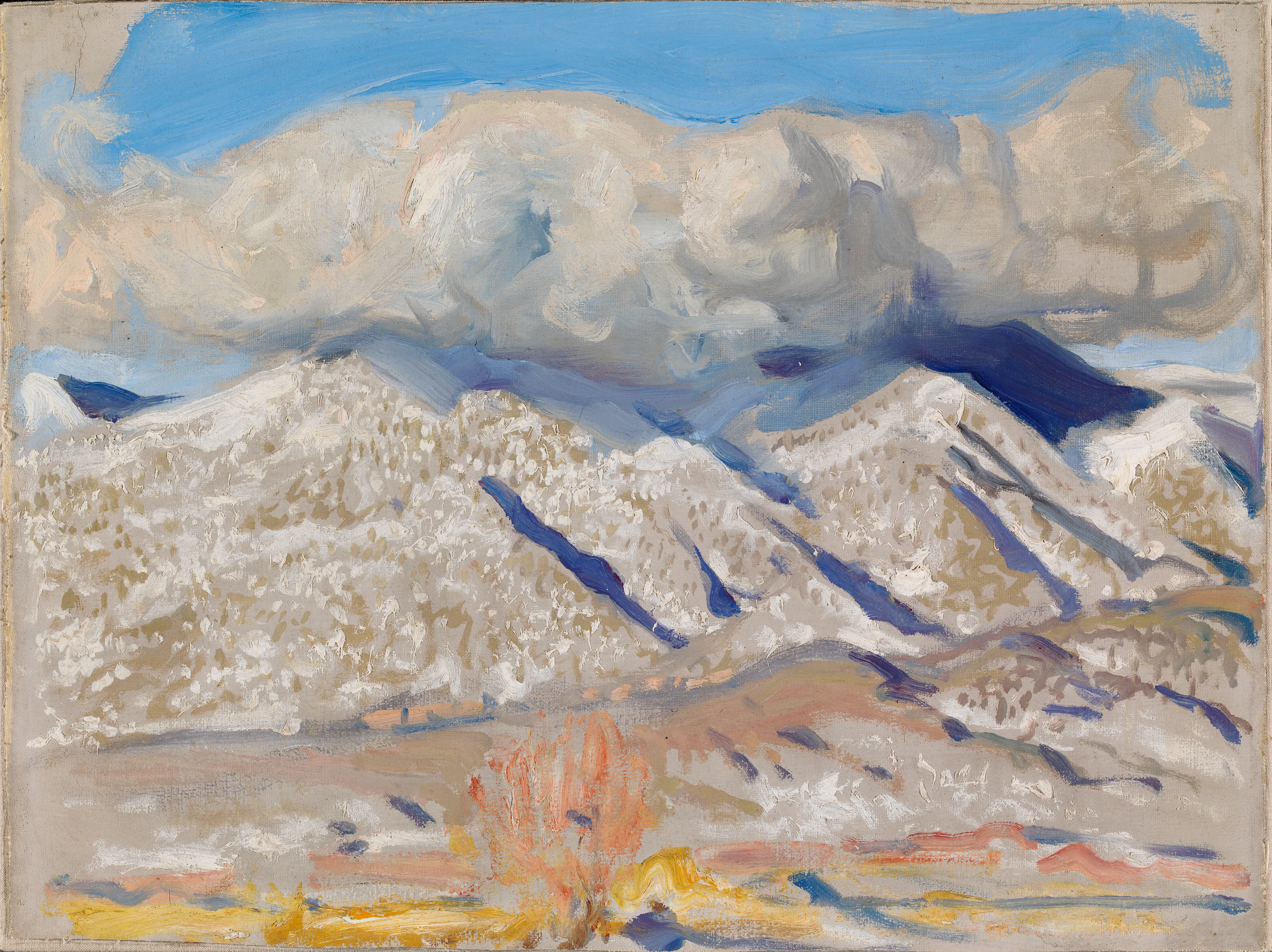
Taos Mountains Shrouded in Clouds, 1924

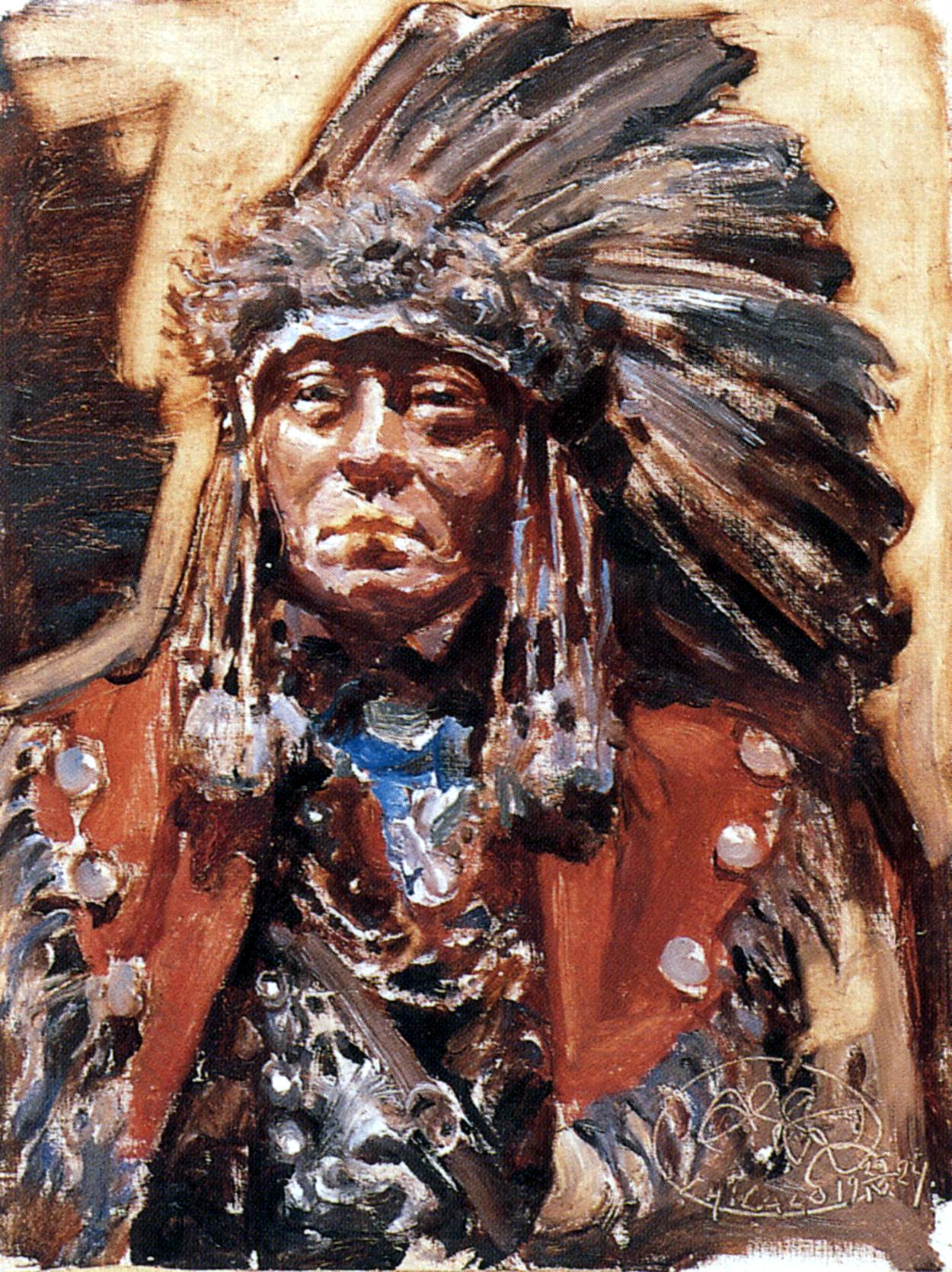
Indian Chief Clear Water, 1924

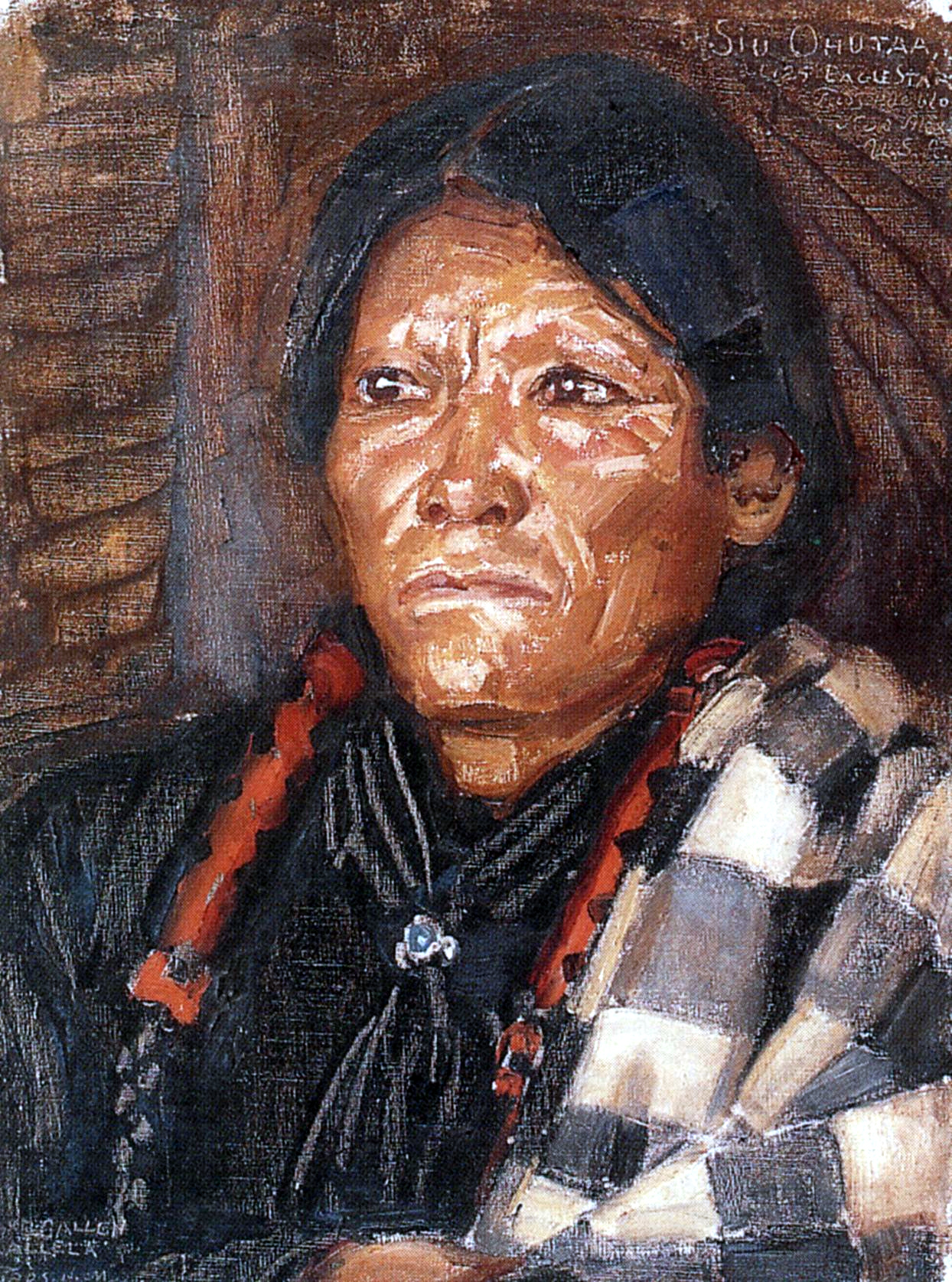
The Indian Sia Ohutaa, 1925

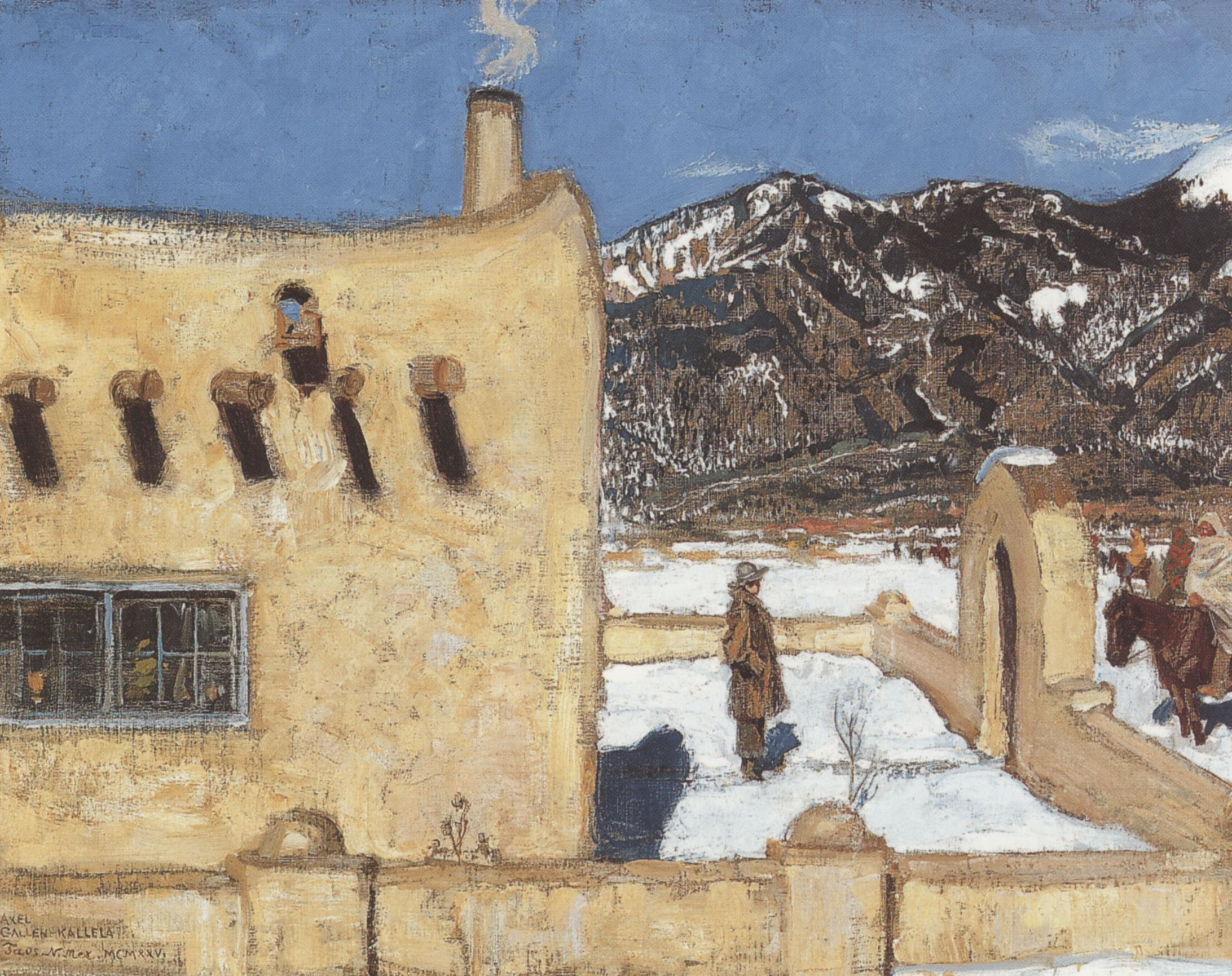
Our Home in Taos, 1925

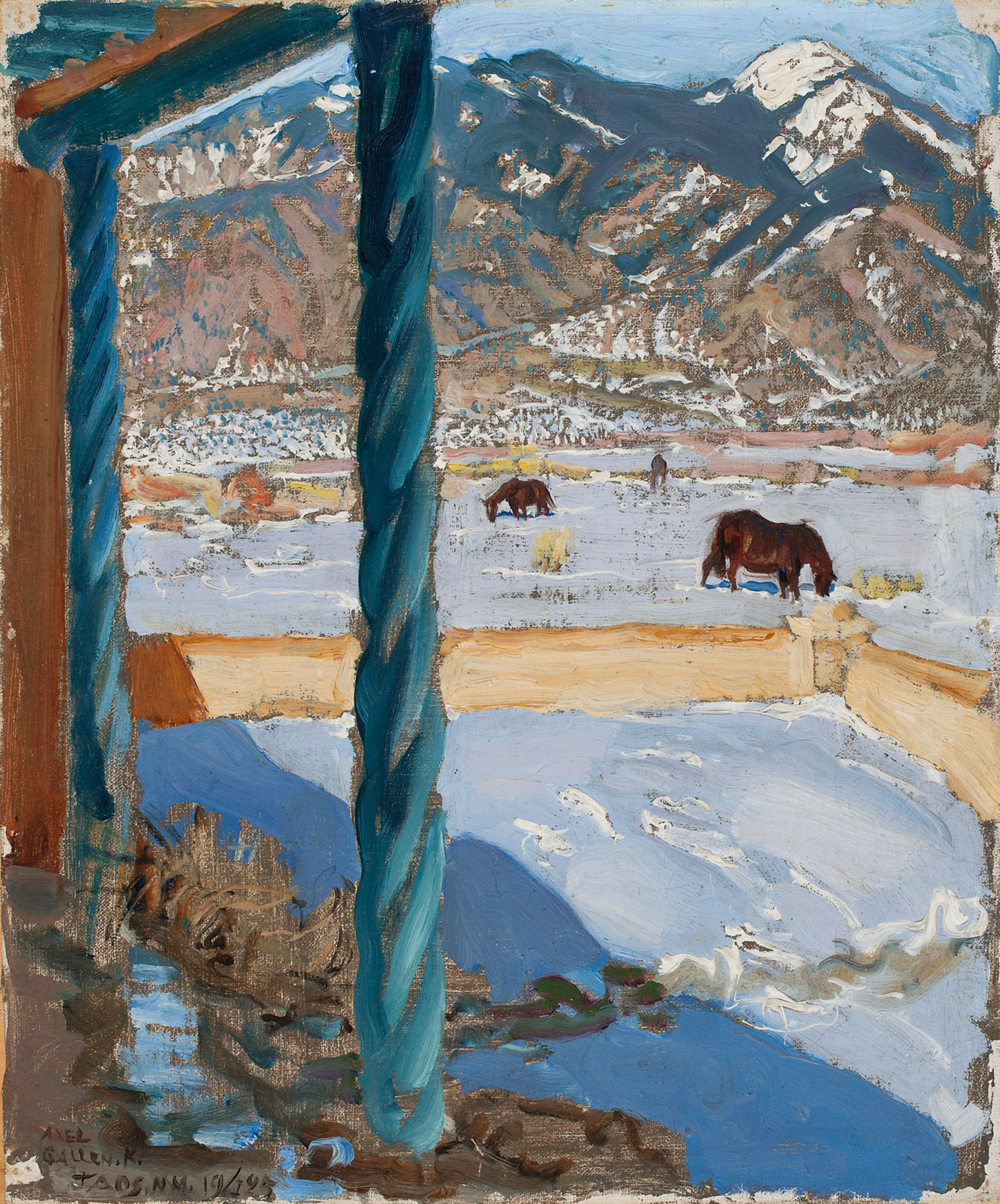
Taos Home in Sunlight, 1925

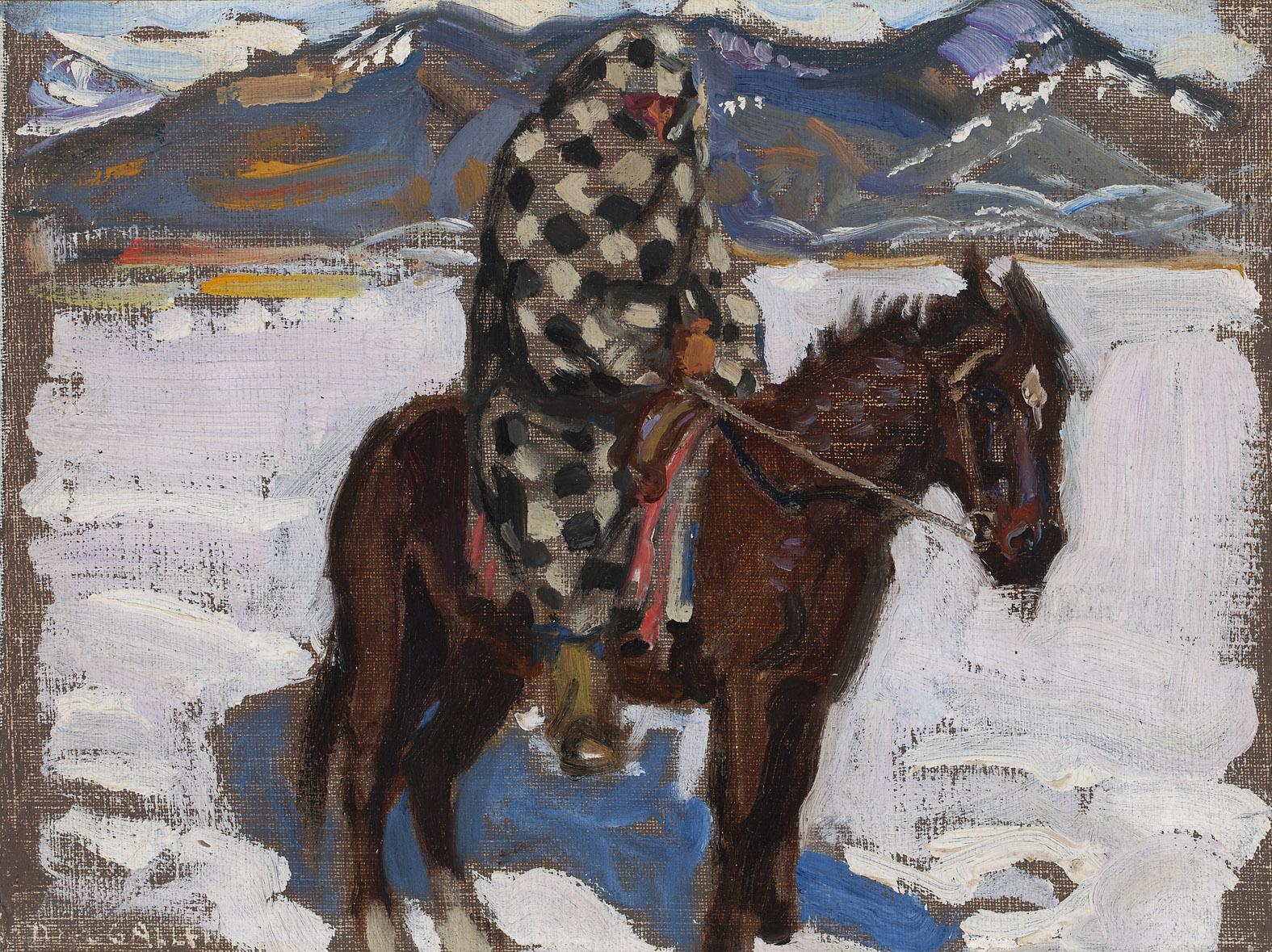
Indian on Horseback in Snow, 1925

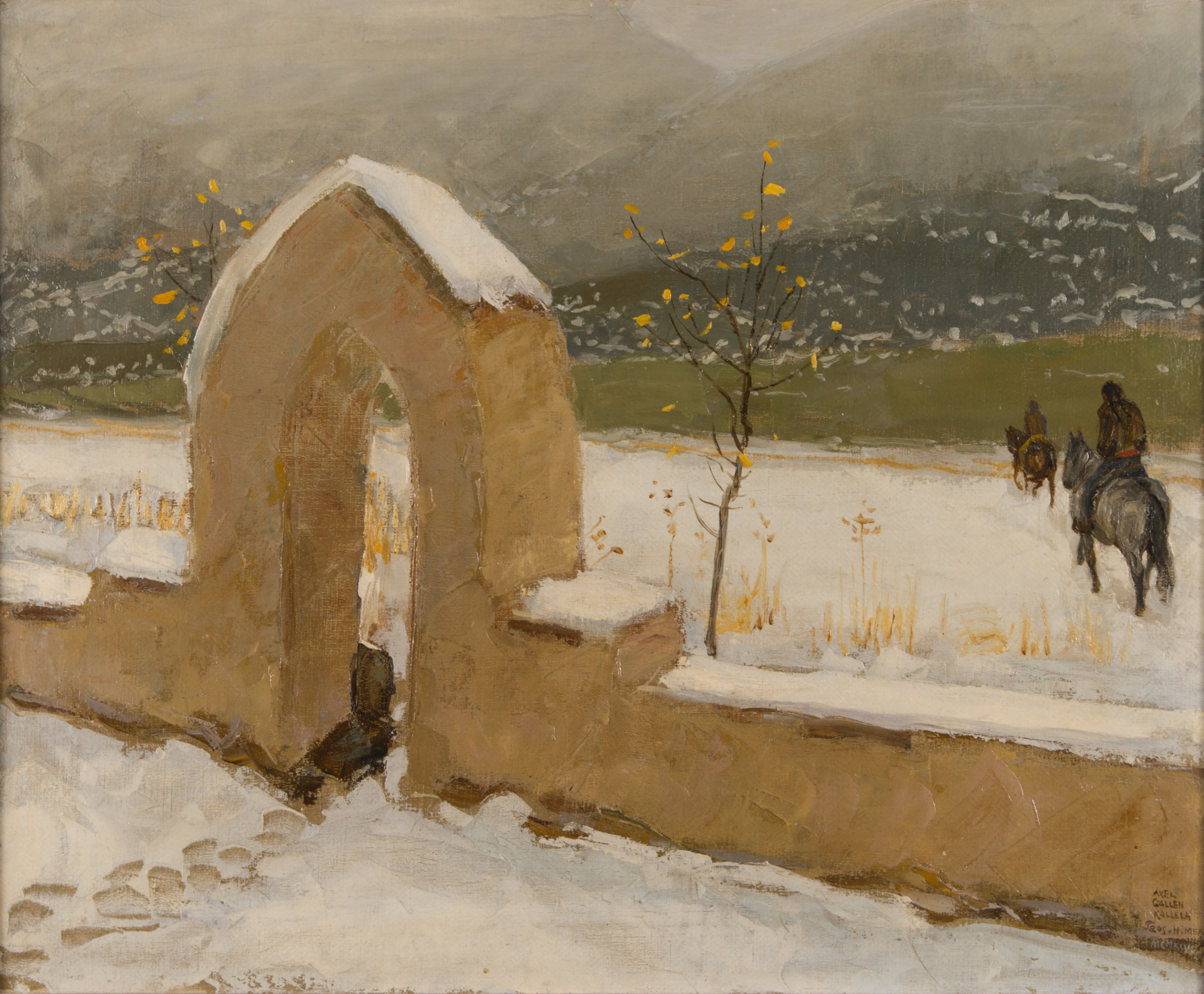
Taos, 1925

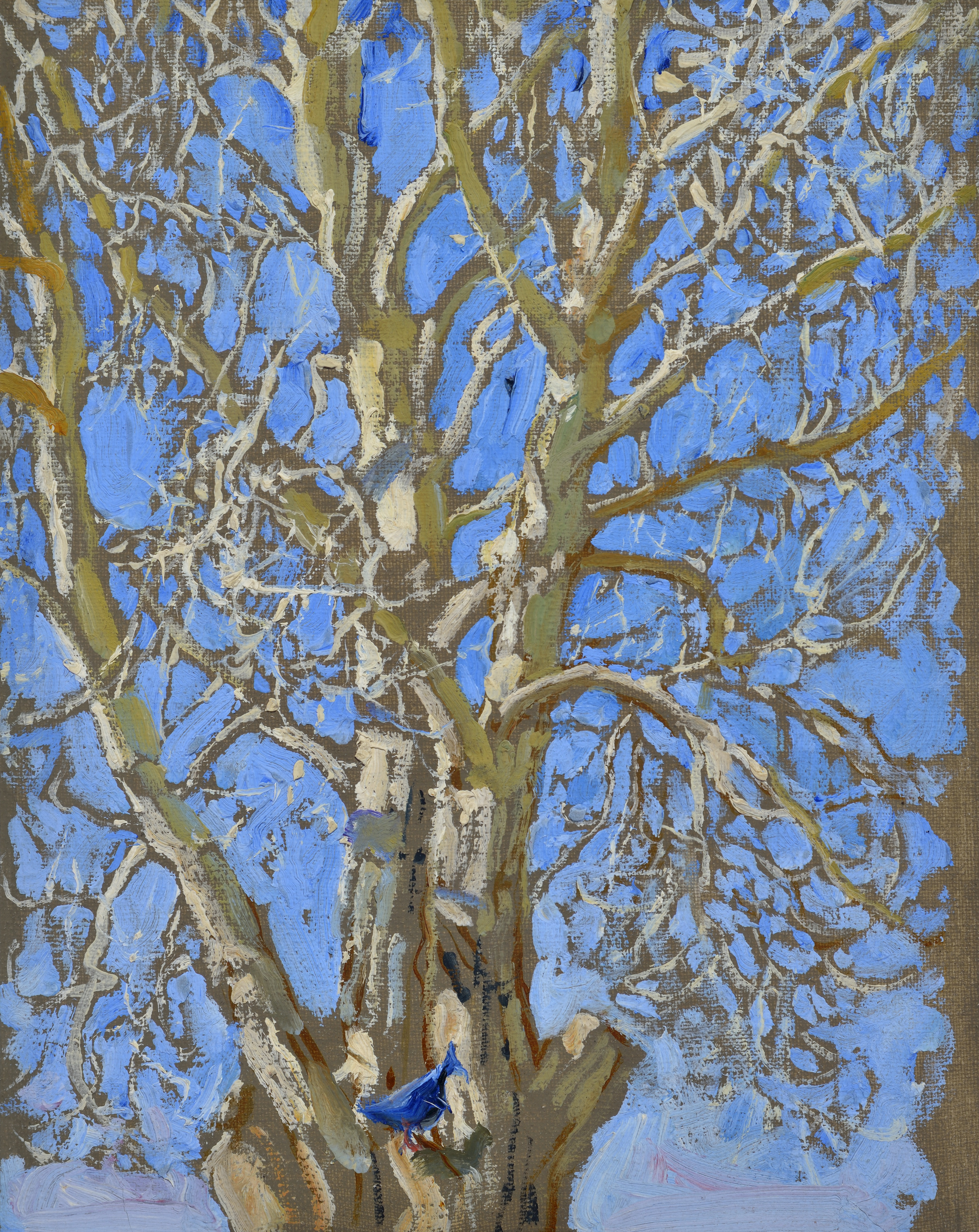
Crack Willow and Blue Bird in New Mexico, 1925

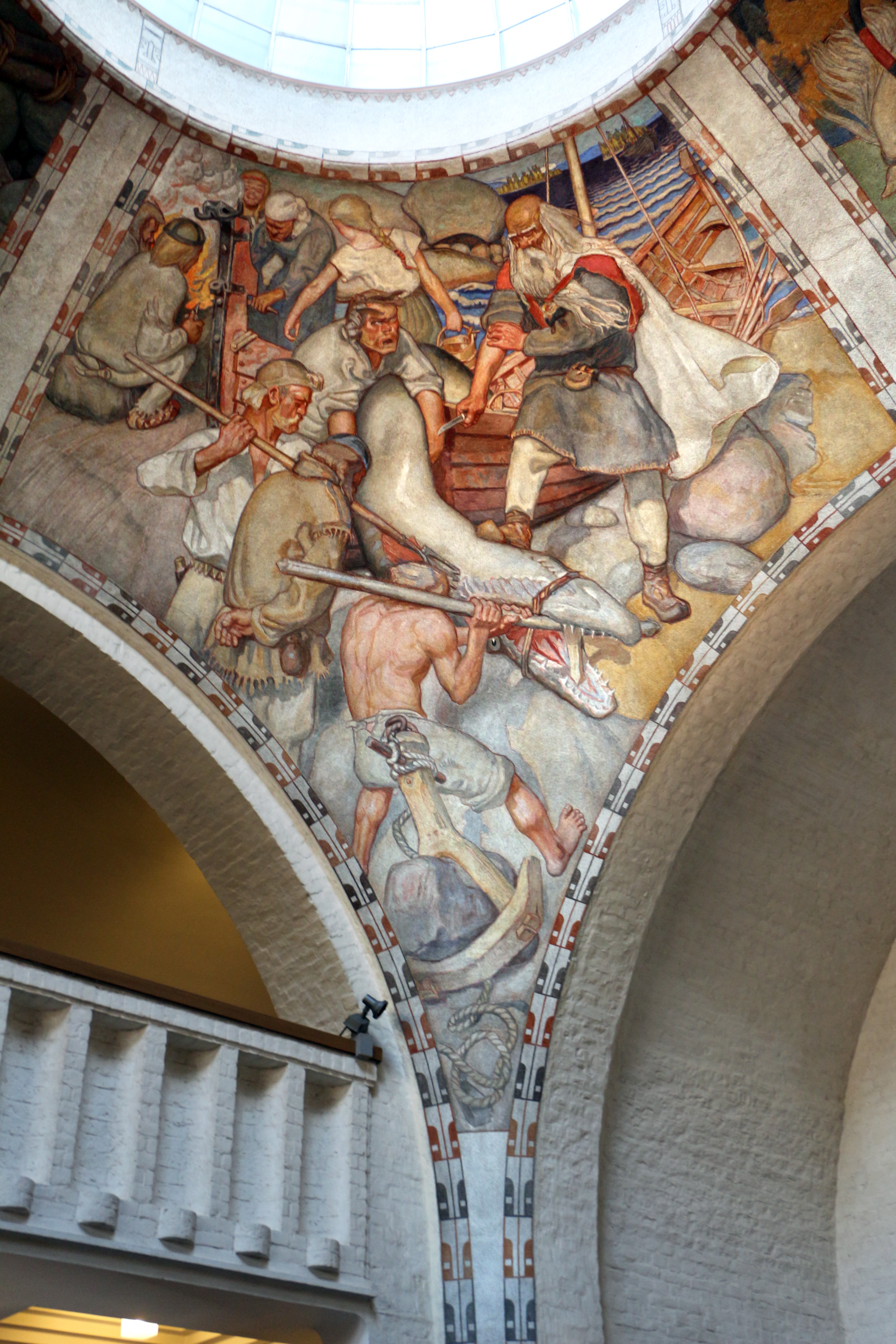
The Great Pike, 1928 fresco based on an earlier a 1904 painting

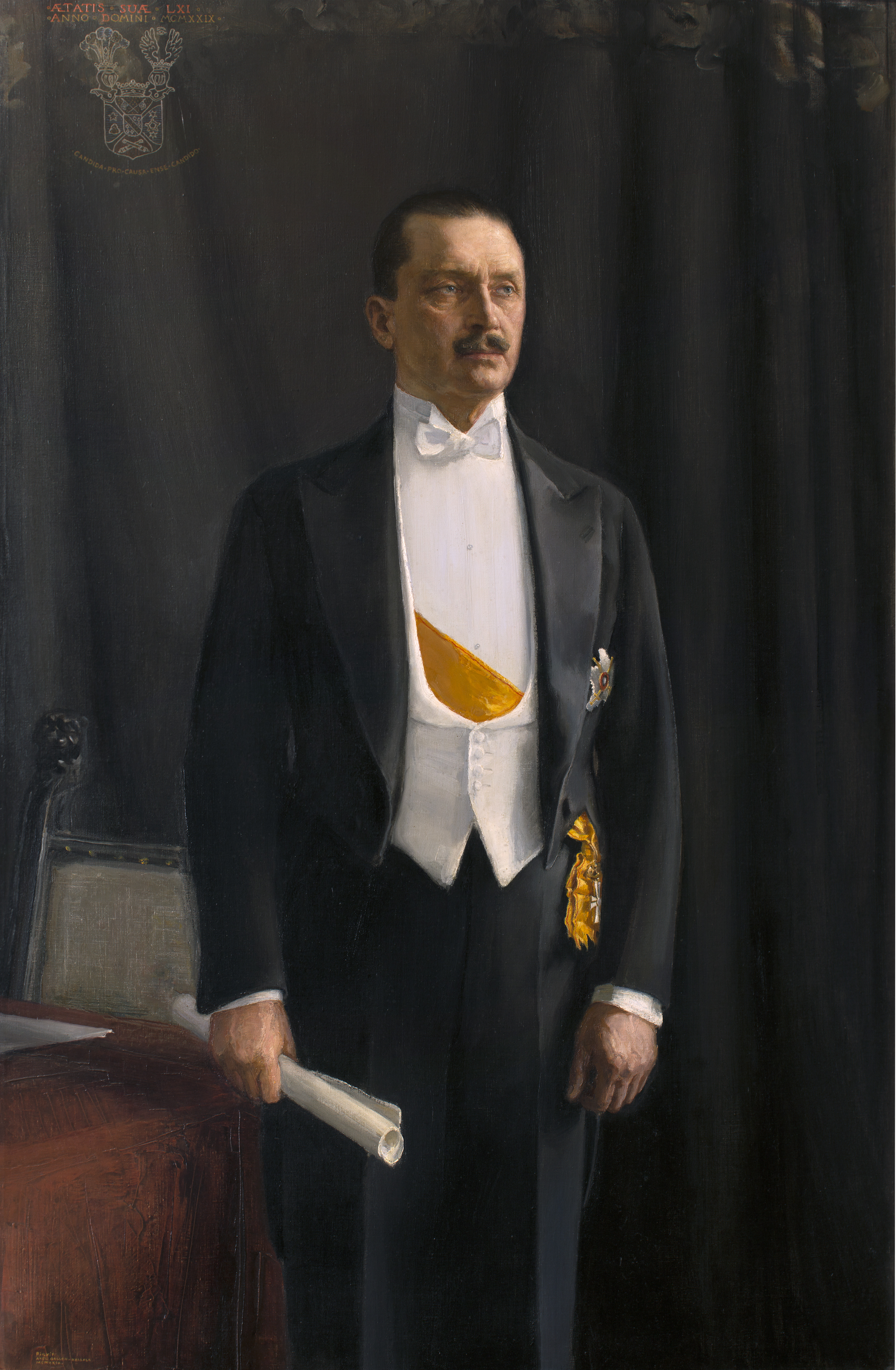
Portrait of Carl Gustaf Emil Mannerheim, 1929

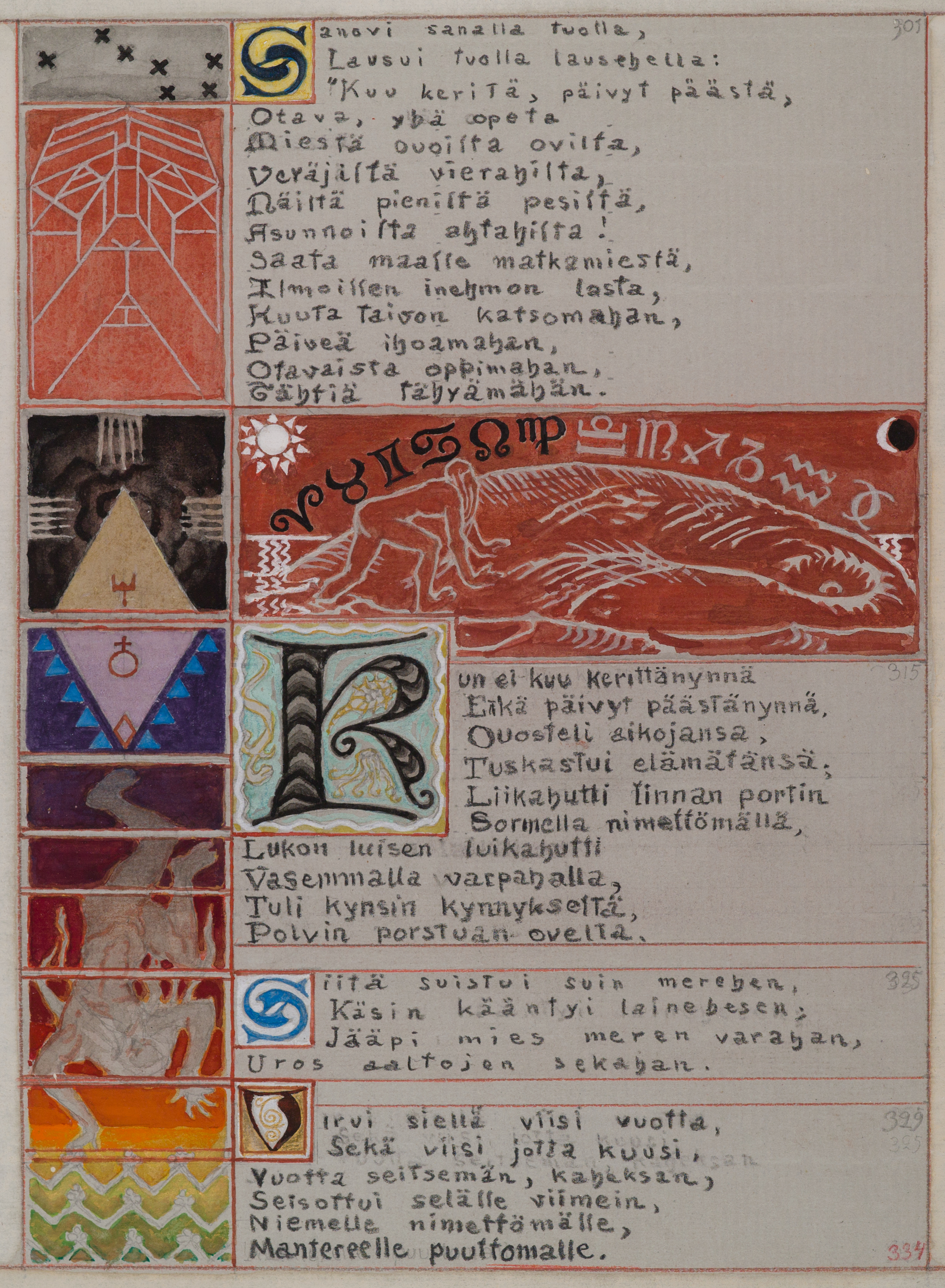
Page depicting the birth of Väinämöinen from the unfinished Great Kalevala, 1920–1930

== Legacy ==
Gallen-Kallela is regarded as one of the most important Finnish artists of his era and a pioneer of a distinctly Finnish national art. The national-romantic style is essentially considered his creation, and his Kalevala imagery has decisively shaped the visual identification of the epic in Finland. He was also a forerunner in graphic art and applied arts, and his work brought new impulses to Finnish architecture and design.

His reputation was contested in the 1920s, when modernist critics did not share the nationalist circles' view of him as the greatest Finnish artist. His standing has since been re-evaluated, first for his realist works and later for his symbolist production, and he is today appreciated above all for his versatility and for shaping the national-romantic style.

His studio and house at Tarvaspää was opened as the Gallen-Kallela Museum in 1961 and houses some of his works and research facilities on him.

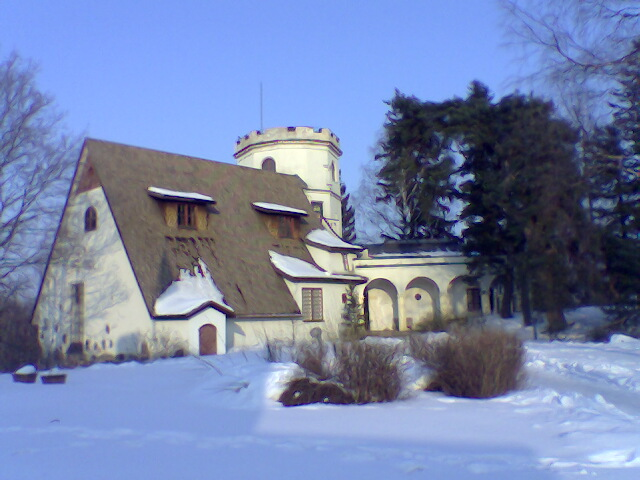
Gallen-Kallela Museum in Tarvaspää

== See also ==
- Golden Age of Finnish Art
- Finnish art
