= List of death deities =

Divine beings associated with death

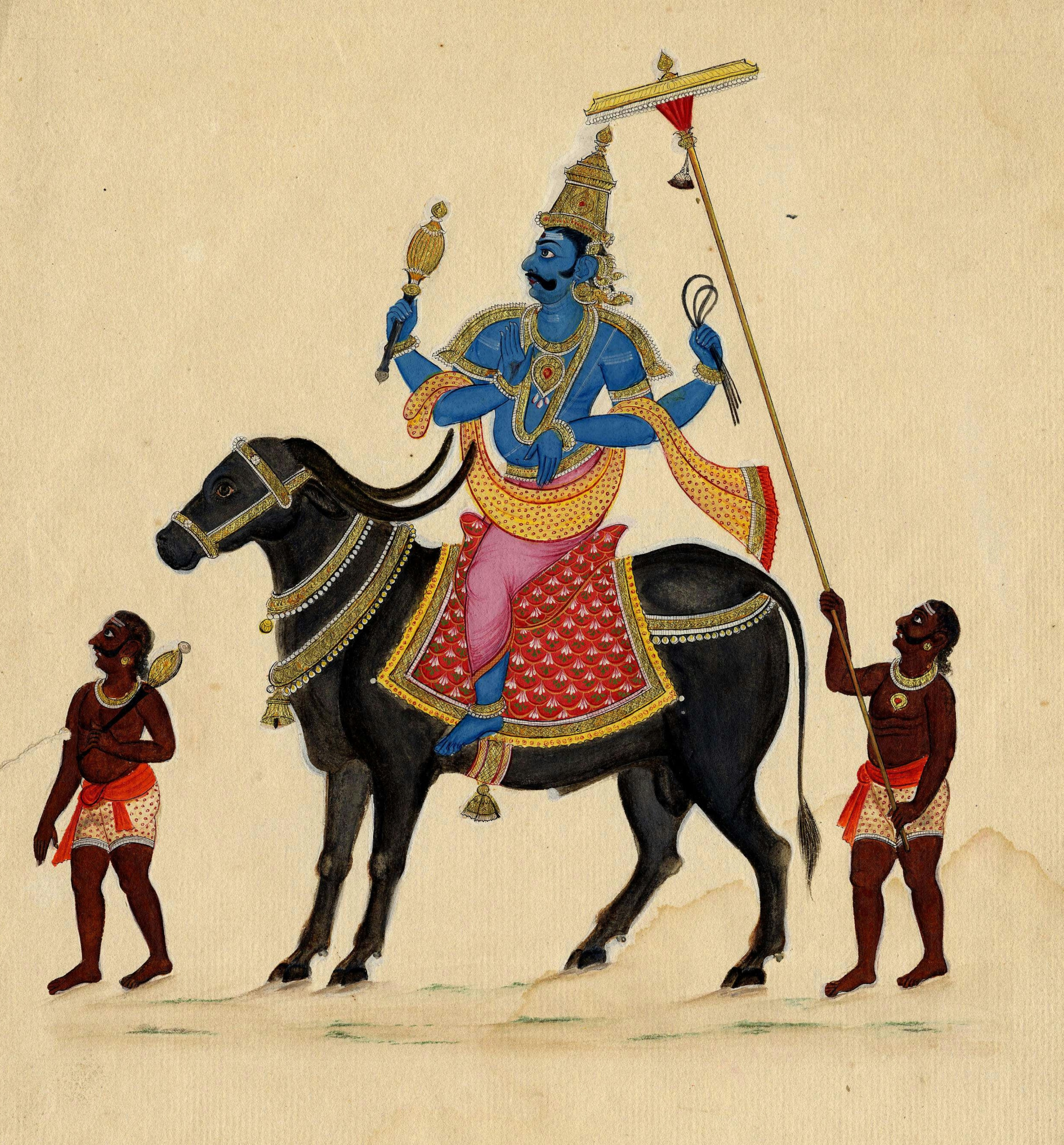
Yama, the Hindu god of death and justice, and Lord of Naraka (hell). He was subsequently adopted by Buddhist, Chinese, Tibetan, Korean, and Japanese mythology as the king of hell.

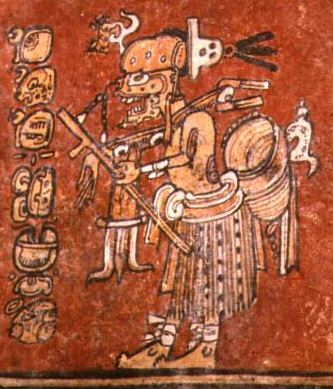
Maya death god "A" way as a hunter, Classic period

The mythology or religion of most cultures incorporate a god of death or, more frequently, a divine being closely associated with death, an afterlife, or an underworld. They are often amongst the most powerful and important entities in a given tradition, reflecting the fact that death, like birth, is central to the human experience. In religions where a single god is the primary object of worship, the representation of death is usually that god's antagonist, and the struggle between the two is central to the folklore of the culture. In such dualistic models, the primary deity usually represents good, and the death god embodies evil. Similarly, death worship is used as a derogatory term to accuse certain groups of morally abhorrent practices which set no value on human life. In monotheistic religions, death is commonly personified by an angel or demon standing in opposition to the god.

== Occurrence ==
In polytheistic religions which have a complex system of deities governing various natural phenomena and aspects of human life, it is common to have a deity who is assigned the function of presiding over death. This deity may perform the act of taking life or, more commonly, simply rule over the afterlife of that particular belief system. A single religion may have separate deities performing each tasks, as is seen in Greek mythology with Thanatos and Hades. The deity in question may be depicted as good, evil, or neutral and simply doing their job, in sharp contrast to modern portrayals of death deities (which tend to be villainizing due to prominent cultural fears surrounding death). The Greek underworld deity Hades is an especially common target due to Christian theology, in which the term "Hades" is typically interchangeable with "death" or "hell". The inclusion of such a "departmental" deity of death in a religion's pantheon is not necessarily a glorification of death.

Both male and female death deities are common, unlike those of other functions that tend to be one gender in particular; for example, fertility and earth deities are typically female, while storm deities are typically male. A single religion/mythology may have death gods of more than one gender existing at the same time, and they are often envisioned as a married couple ruling over the afterlife together, as seen with the Aztecs, Greeks, and Romans.

In monotheistic religions, a single god governs both life and death, as well as all other domains. This manifests as rituals and traditions that differ substantially with those of polytheistic religions, and varies according to a number of factors, including geography, politics, traditions, and the influence of other religions.

== Africa and the Middle East ==
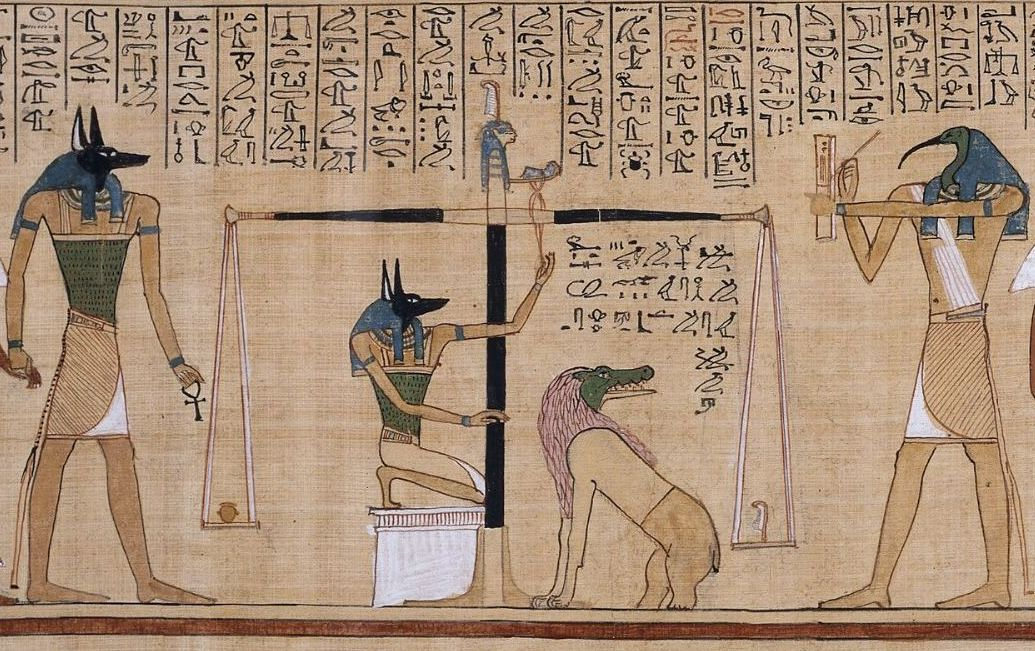
Section of the Book of the Dead for the scribe Hunefer, depicting the Weighing of the Heart in Duat, featuring the deities Anubis, Ammit and Thoth

=== West Africa ===
==== Igbo ====
- Ala (Igbo mythology)
- Ogbunabali (Igbo mythology)

==== Yoruba ====
- Èṣù, oriṣa of crossroads and trickery who controls the Ajogun, of which Iku (Death) is a member. (Yoruba religion)
- Iku, personification of death. (Yoruba religion)
- Ọya, oriṣa of storms and the dead. (Yoruba religion)
- Babalú-Ayé, oriṣa of disease and mortality. (Yoruba religion)
- Yewa, oriṣa of fertility, decay and cemeteries, guardian of the transition between life and death. (Yoruba religion)

==== Akan ====
- Owuo, Akan God of Death and Destruction, and the Personification of death. Name means death in the Akan language.
- Asase Yaa, one half of an Akan Goddess of the barren places on Earth, Truth and is Mother of the Dead
- Amokye, Psychopomp in Akan religion who fishes the souls of the dead from the river leading to Asamando, the Akan underworld
- Nkrabea, The deity of destiny and fate, believed to influence human fortunes and life paths, as well as their deaths.

=== East Africa ===
==== Somali ====
- Huur, a messenger of Death who had the form of a large bird similar to Horus of ancient Egypt.

=== Afroasiatic Middle East ===
==== Armenian ====
- Spandaramet, an old Armenian goddess of death and the underworld

==== Canaanite ====
- Mot

==== Egyptian ====
- Aker (Egyptian mythology)
- Andjety, an old Egyptian god
- Anubis, guardian of the dead, mummification, and the afterlife in ancient Egyptian religion
- Aqen, a rarely mentioned deity in the Book of the Dead
- Assessors of Maat, charged with judging the souls of the dead in the afterlife
- Duamutef, one of the four sons of Horus
- Hapi, one of the four sons of Horus
- Imset, one of the four sons of Horus
- Kherty Egyptian earth god
- Medjed, an unusual looking god mentioned in the Book of the Dead
- Nephthys (NebetHuet), Anubis' mother; sister of Osiris and Isis (Aset); also a guardian of the dead. She was believed to also escort dead souls to Osiris
- Nehebkau, the primordial snake and funerary god associated with the afterlife, and one of the forty-two assessors of Maat
- Osiris, lord of the Underworld
- Qebehsenuef, one of the four sons of Horus
- Seker, a falcon god of the Memphite necropolis who was known as a patron of the living, as well as a god of the dead. He is known to be closely tied to Osiris
- Serapis, Graeco-Egyptian syncretistic deity, combining elements of Osiris, the Apis Bull, Hades, Demeter, and Dionysus. Also, patron of the Ptolemaic Kingdom and Alexandria
- Wepwawet, a wolf god of war, and brother of Anubis, being seen as one who opened the ways to, and through, Duat, for the spirits of the dead

==== Mesopotamian ====
- Ereshkigal (Sumerian mythology, Akkadian mythology, Babylonian mythology), first lady of the Underworld
- Namtar (Sumerian mythology, Akkadian mythology, Babylonian mythology), Ereshkigal's sukkal.
- Nergal (Sumerian mythology, Akkadian mythology, Babylonian mythology), second lord of the Underworld
- Inshushinak (Elamite mythology; also present in the Mesopotamian An-Anum god list.)
- Nungal (Babylonian mythology), daughter of Ereshkigal
- Erra (god)
- Ugur (Hurrian religion; also a sukkal of Nergal)
- Ninazu
- Ningishzida
- Allani
- Enmesharra, a primordial deity described as "lord of the underworld"
- Kanisurra, a goddess whose name is derived from the term "ganzer," referring to the underworld (Mesopotamian)
- Shuwala, a goddess of Hurrian origin worshipped in Ur
- Lagamal, minor underworld deity
- Birtum, husband of Manungal

== Western Eurasia ==
=== European ===
==== Albanian ====
- Djall, symbolizes the devil. (Djaj(plural))
- Mortja, personification of death. An equivalent of Grim Reaper.(Female)(Mortjet, plural)
- Vdekja, personification of death. (Female)
- E Bukura e Dheut, goddess of earth, underworld, afterlife

==== Balto-Finnic ====
- Tuoni (Finnish mythology, Estonian mythology)

==== Balto-Slavic ====
- Giltinė (Lithuanian mythology)
- Māra (Latvian mythology)
- Morana (Slavic mythology)
- Peckols (Prussian mythology)
- Peklenc
- Veles
- Chernobog (Slavic mythology)

==== Basque ====
- Herio (Basque mythology)

==== Celtic ====
- Ankou (Breton people)
- Arawn
- Cichol
- Crom Cruach
- Donn
- Mannanan
- The Morrigan

==== Germanic ====
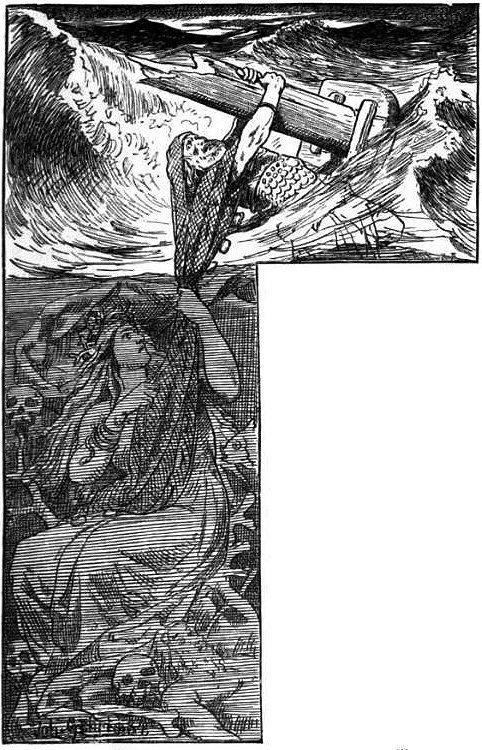
Rán uses her net to pull a seafarer into the depths in an illustration by Johannes Gehrts, 1901

- Freyja, presides over Fólkvangr; chooses half of those who die in battle
- Gefjon, a goddess who oversees those who die as virgins
- Hel, goddess of the dead and ruler of the land of the same name, Hel,
- Odin presides over Valhalla and gets half of those who die in battle; there they train for Ragnarök
- Rán, the sea goddess who collects the drowned in her net

==== Etruscan ====
- Aita, god of the underworld
- Culga, a female underworld spirit
- Februus, god of purification, death, the underworld, and riches
- Mani, spirits of the dead
- Mania, goddess of the dead
- Mantus, god of the underworld
- Orcus, god of the underworld
- Tuchulcha, an underworld spirit
- Vanth, winged spirit of the underworld

==== Greek ====
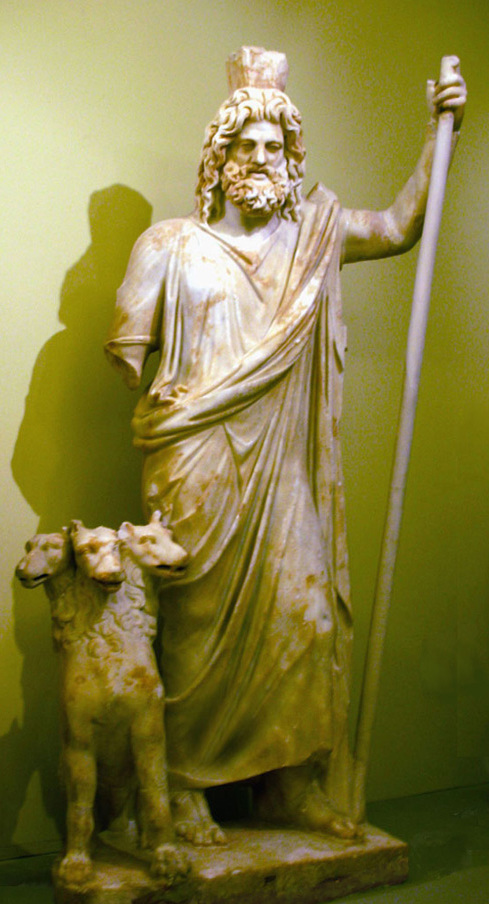
Hades or Serapis with his dog Cerberus

- Achlys, goddess who symbolizes the mist of death. Goddess of poisons, personification of misery and sadness.
- Apollo, god of diseases
- Atropos, one of the moirai, who cut the thread of life.
- Charon, a daimon who acted as ferryman of the dead.
- Erebus, the primordial god of darkness, his mists encircled the underworld and filled the hollows of the earth
- Erinyes, chthonic deities of vengeance
- Hades, king of the underworld and god of the dead
- Hecate, goddess of witchcraft, she helped Demeter in the search for Persephone and was allowed to live in the Underworld as her magic works best at night
- Hermes, the messenger god who acted as psychopompos
- Hypnos, personification of sleep, twin of Thanatos, his Roman counterpart is Somnus
- Keres, goddesses of violent death, sisters of Thanatos
- Lampades, torch-bearing underworld nymphs
- Limos was the goddess of starvation in ancient Greek religion. She was opposed by Demeter, goddess of grain and the harvest with whom Ovid wrote Limos could never meet, and Plutus, the god of wealth and the bounty of rich harvests.
- Persephone, queen of the underworld; wife of Hades and goddess of spring growth
- Serapis, Graeco-Egyptian syncretistic deity, combining elements of Osiris, the Apis Bull, Hades, Demeter, and Dionysus. Also, patron of the Ptolemaic Kingdom and Alexandria.
- Tartarus, the darkest, deepest part of the underworld, often used for imprisoning enemies of the Olympians
- Thanatos, personification of death, Roman counterpart is Mors
- Gods of the seven rivers of the underworld:
1. Acheron, god of the river Acheron
2. Alpheus, god of the river Alpheus
3. Cocytus, god of the river Cocytus
4. Eridanos, god of the river Eridanos
5. Lethe, goddess of the river Lethe
6. Phlegethon, god of the river Phlegethon
7. Styx, goddess of the river Styx, a river that formed a boundary between the living and the dead

==== Roman ====
- Dea Tacita, goddess of the dead
- Di inferi, ancient Roman deities associated with death and the Underworld
- Dis Pater, god of the underworld
- Laverna, goddess of thieves, cheats, and the underworld
- Lemures, the malevolent dead
- Libitina, goddess of funerals and burials
- Manes, spirits of the dead
- Mania, goddess of death
- Mors, personification of death, Greek equivalent is Thanatos
- Nenia Dea, goddess of funerals
- Orcus, punisher of broken oaths; usually folded in with Pluto
- Pluto, ruler of the Underworld
- Proserpina, queen of the underworld
- Soranus, underworld Sabine god adopted by the Romans
- Viduus, god who separated the soul and body after death

=== Western Asia ===
==== Elamite ====
- Inshushinak

==== Persian-Zoroastrian ====
- Angra Mainyu or Ahriman, the destructive spirit (Persian mythology)
- Asto Vidatu or Astiwihad or Asto-widhatu, death deity (Persian mythology)
- Vayu-Vata, god of wind, storm, the breath of life and the final breath of death (Yazata)

Ossetian

- Aminon, gatekeeper of the underworld.
- Barastyr, ruler of the underworld.
- Ishtar-Deela, lord of the underworld in Nakh.

=== Uralic ===
- Azyren (Mari people)
- Kalma, Finnish goddess of death and decay, her name meaning "the stench of corpses"
- Nga (Nenets)
- Tuoni (Finnish mythology), with his wife and children.

== Eastern Asia ==
=== Korean ===
- Yeom-ra, or Great King Yeom-ra' (King Yama)
- Jeoseung Saja

=== Chinese ===
- Yanluo Wang

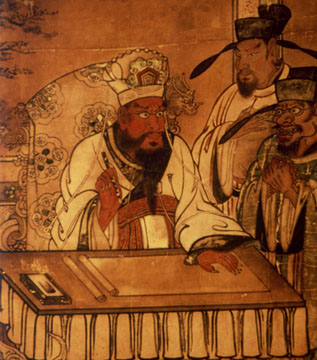
Yanluo Wang

Emperor(s) of Youdu (Capital City of the Underworld)

- Di Guan Da Di
- Dong Yue Da Di
- Feng Du Da Di
- Yanluo Wang (King Yama)
- Meng Po

Judges of the Ten Underworld Courts

- Jiang Ziwen
- Bao Zheng
- Dong Ji
- Huang Xile

The rest only have surnames including Li, Yu, Lu, Bi, Lu and Xue.

Four Kings of the Underworld

- Bao Zheng
- Han Qinhu
- Fan Zhongyan
- Kou Zhun

Ghost Kings of the Five Regions

- Cai Yulei
- Zhao He
- Zhang Heng
- Duzi Ren
- Zhou Qi

Ghost Kings of the Five Regions (Ver.2)

- Shen Cha
- Yang Yun
- Yan Di (Shenlong)
- Ji Kang
- Immortal Wang

Governors of Fengdu

- Deng Ai
- Ji Ming

Imperial Censor of Fengdu

- Han Yi
- Zeng Yuanshan
- Jiao Zhongqing
- Ma Zhong
- Song Youqing
- Guan Yu (note: different from the famous general of three kingdoms)
- Wu Lun
- Tu Cha

Four Generals of the Direct Altar of Fengdu

- Ma Sheng
- Ma Chuanzhong
- Chen Yuanbo
- Guo Zhongyou

Eight Generals of the Inner Altar of Fengdu

- Wei Tin, Ghost Capturing General
- Liu Chu, Ghost Restraining General
- Wang Jian, Ghost Flailing General
- Meng E, Ghost Interrogating General
- Che Zi, Guardian of the East Gate
- Xia Dali, Guardian of the West Gate
- Lie Weizhi, Guardian of the South Gate
- Sang Tongguai, Guardian of the North Gate

Eight Generals of the Outer Altar of Fengdu

- Zhang Yuanlian
- Chen Yuanqing
- Li Yuande
- Fan YuanZhang
- Du YuanZhen
- Liu Yuanfu
- Chang Yuan
- Jia Taoyuan

Ten Masters of the Underworld

- A Bang, Bull Head
- Luo Cha, Horse Face
- Xie Bi'an, Wondering God of the Day
- Fan Wujiu, Wondering God of the Night
- Hei Wuchang (Black Impermanence)
- Bai Wuchang (White Impermanence)
- Huangfeng (responsible for insects)
- Paowei (responsible for animals)
- Yusai (responsible for fishes)
- Guaiwang (responsible for Hungry Ghosts)

(Note: in some versions, Xie Bi'an and Fanjiu are the Bai Wuchang and Hei Wuchang, respectively.)

Four Strongmen of Fengdu

- Zhang Yuanzhen, Taiyi Strongman
- Hu Wenzhong, Tri-day Strongman
- Sun Zhongwu, Demon-smiting Strongman
- Tang Bocheng, Ghost-smiting Strongman

Two Agents of Fengdu

- Xun Gongda, Great God of the Black Sky
- Liu Guangzhong, Great God of the Black Fog

Wardens of the Nine Prison of Fengdu

- Wang Yuanzhen
- Zhen Yan
- Yao Quan
- Shi Tong
- Zhou Sheng
- Diao Xiao
- Kong Sheng
- Wu Yan
- Wang Tong

Administers of the Six Paths of Rebirth of Fengdu

- Cao Qing, Administer of the Path of Heaven
- Tien Yan, Administer of the Path of Ghosts
- Cui Cong, Administer of the Path of Earth
- Ji Bie, Administer of the Path of Gods
- Chen De, Administer of the Path of Hungry Ghosts
- Gao Ren, Administer of the Path of Beasts

Judges of Fengdu

- Cui (Chief Judge)
- Wang Fu
- Ban Jian
- Zi He
- Jia Yuan
- Zhao Sheng
- Zhang Qi
- Yang Tong
- Fu Po
- Zhu Shun
- Li Gong
- Xue Zhong
- Rong Zhen
- Lu Zhongce
- Chen Xun
- Huang Shou
- Zhou Bi
- Bian Shen
- Cheng De
- Liu Bao
- Dong Jie
- Guo Yuan

=== Japanese ===
- Izanami, when she died she became queen of the underworld, Yomi, and goddess of the dead.
- Enma, god and ruler of the dead in Japanese Buddhism
- Shinigami, god of death
- Susanoo
- Ōkuninushi, an alternate ruler of the underworld

== North and Central Asian mythology ==
- Erlik (Turkic mythology)
- Xargi (Siberian mythology)

== Oceanian mythology ==
- Wuluwaid (Australian Aboriginal mythology)
- Degei (Fijian mythology)
- Hine-nui-te-pō (Maori mythology)
- Whiro (Maori mythology)

== South Asian mythology ==
=== Hindu ===
- Yama - the god of death & divine judge of afterlife
- Chitragupta - Yama's record keeper, keeps account of the good & misdeeds of souls, on the basis of which the dead are judged.
- Yamaduta - Spirits under control of Yama, who are responsible for bringing the dead souls into Yama's presence. However, from the anecdote of Satyavan & Savitri, it is shown that even Yama performs this role.
- Kāla - the personification of time, also associated with death
- Shiva - the god who is the destroyer of the world at the time of pralaya. As Kalantaka, he is also the conqueror of death. As Bhairava, he is strongly associated with death & destruction.
- Kali - Shiva's spouse, strongly associated with death & destruction.
- Chamunda - A related form of Kali, invoked for seeking death of enemies during wartime.

=== Tibetan Buddhist ===
Tibetan Buddhism, like all other Buddhist denominations, affirms the rejection of the existence of souls (anatta) & existence of a creator God (see the theory of dependent origination), while at the same time affirming in the existence of heaven and hell. The beings listed here aren't 'gods of death' in the traditional sense, they are rather beings that invoke a lot of funerary aspect with them.

- Citipati - guardian spirits of charnel grounds
- Dakini - Female spirits strongly associated with the imagery of death.
- Heruka - Beings strongly associated with the imagery of death & charnel grounds
- Wrathful deities - Meditational deities invoking the imagery of death.

== Southeast Asian mythology ==
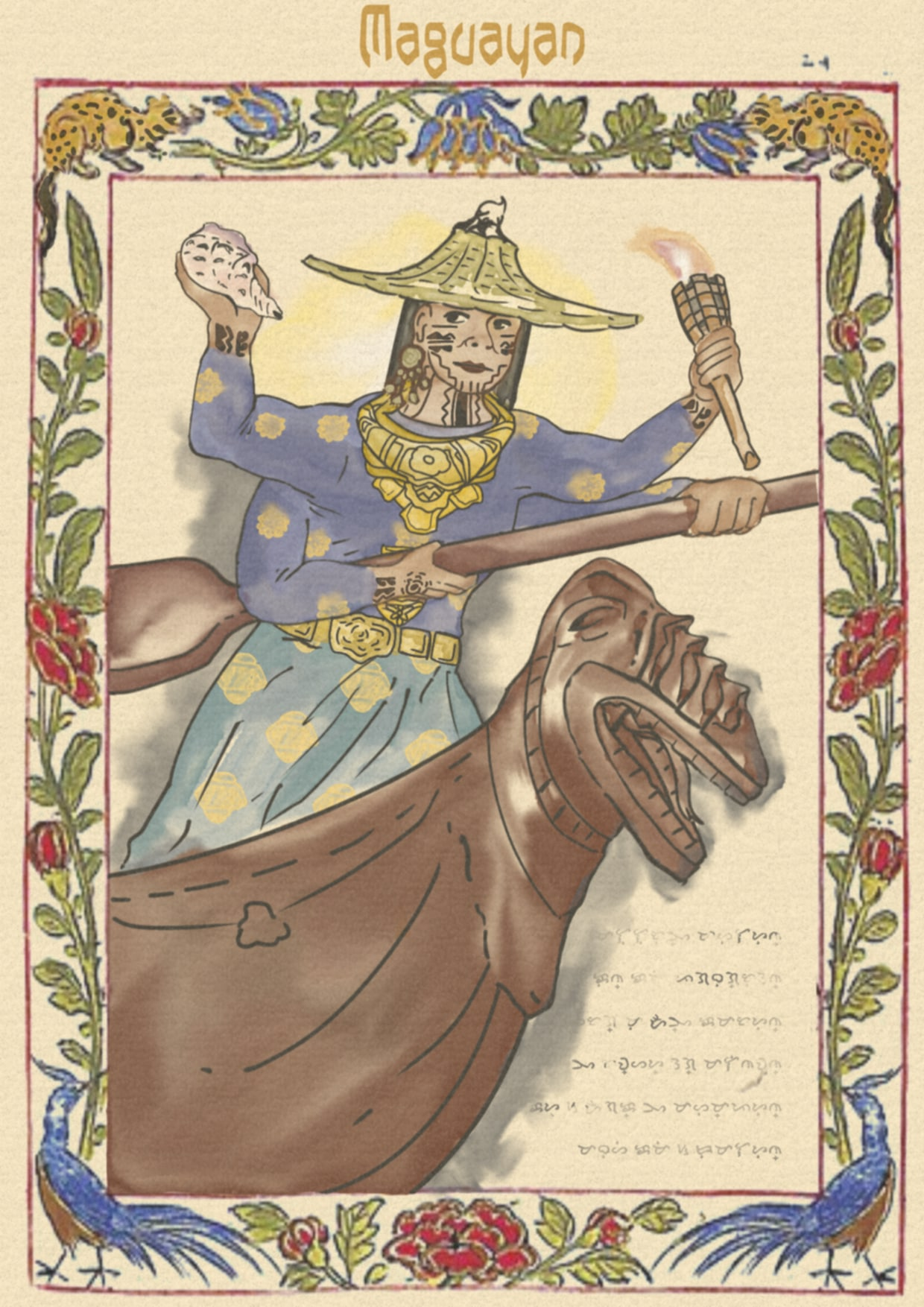
Magwayen

- Batara Kala (Balinese mythology), god of the underworld in traditional Javanese and Balinese mythology, ruling over it in a cave along with Setesuyara. Batara Kala is also named the creator of light and the earth. He is also the god of time and destruction, who devours unlucky people. He is related to Hindu concept of Kāla. In mythology, he causes eclipses by trying to eat the Sun or the Moon.
- Shingon (nat) (Burmese)
- Thongalel (Manipuri mythology)
- Pong Lalondong (Toraja), god of death

=== Philippines ===
- Tagbayan (Ifugao mythology): divinities associated with death that feast on human souls that are guarded by two headed monsters called kikilan
- Fulor (Ifugao mythology): a wood carved into an image of a dead person seated on a death chair; an antique which a spirit in it, who bring sickness, death, and unsuccessful crops when sacrifices are not offered
- Kabunyan (Kalanguya mythology): the almighty creator; also referred to as Agmattebew, the spirit who could not be seen; the mabaki ritual is held in the deity's honor during planting, harvesting, birth and death of the people, and other activities for livelihood
- Binangewan (Aeta mythology): spirits who bring change, sickness, and death as punishment
- Aring Sinukûan (Kapampangan mythology): sun god of war and death, taught the early inhabitants the industry of metallurgy, wood cutting, rice culture and even waging war
- Lakandánup (Kapampangan mythology): serpent goddess who comes during total eclipses; followed by famine; eats a person's shadow, which will result in withering and death; daughter of Áring Sínukuan and Dápu
- Sidapa (Bisaya mythology): the goddess of death; co-ruler of the middleworld called Kamaritaan, together with Makaptan
- Sidapa (Hiligaynon mythology): god who lives in the sacred Mount Madia-as; determines the day of a person's death by marking every newborn's lifespan on a very tall tree on Madya-as
- Hangin (Hiligaynon mythology): the spirits of the death wind; takes the life of the elderly
- Patag'aes (Suludnon mythology): awaits until midnight then enters the house to have a conversation with the living infant; if he discovers someone is eavesdropping, he will choke the child to death; their conversation creates the fate of the child, on how long the child wants to live and how the child will eventually die, where the child will always get to choose the answers; once done, Patag'aes takes out his measuring stick, computes the child's life span, and then departs, sealing the child's fate
- Pamulak Manobo (Bagobo mythology): supreme deity who controls good harvest, rain, wind, life, and death; in some myths, the chief deity is simply referred as the male deity, Diwata
- Malakal Maut (Maranao mythology): the angel of death; takes the souls of someone after three to seven days from the falling of the person's leaf from the sacred Sadiarathul Montaha tree in the realm called Sorga; appears either a handsome prince or a grotesque monsters, depending if the soul he is getting comes from a sinner or a virtuous person; punishes the souls of sinners until final judgment, while lifting up the souls of the good onto heaven
- Kumakatok - hooded and cloaked harbingers of death that would knock on doors of the dying in Tagalog mythology
- Magwayen - the goddess of afterlife and the first ocean deity, according to Visayan mythology. Known for being the goddess who collects souls and takes them to Sulad with her boat. The souls are initially transferred to her via Pandaki, who gets the soul from Sidapa.
- Sitan - god and caretaker of the underworld realm for evil souls known as Kasamaan in Tagalog mythology. Maca, the realm of the good dead, is jointly ruled by Sitan and Bathala.
- Manduyapit - bring souls across a red river in Manobo mythology
- Mama Guayen - ferries souls to the end of the world in Ilonggo mythology
- Badadum - deity in Waray mythology that gathers family members at the mouth of a river to make a farewell to the deceased

=== Vietnam ===
- Diêm Vương (King Yama)
- Mạnh Bà
- Hắc Bạch Vô Thường, two spirits capture souls.
- Đầu Trâu
- Mặt Ngựa

== American mythology ==
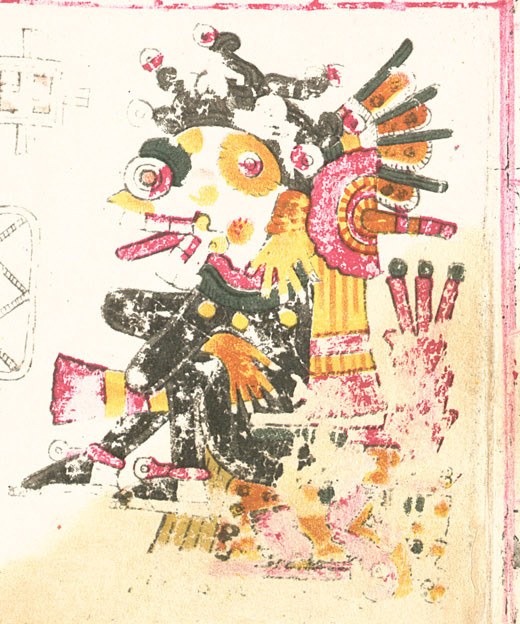
Mictlāntēcutli

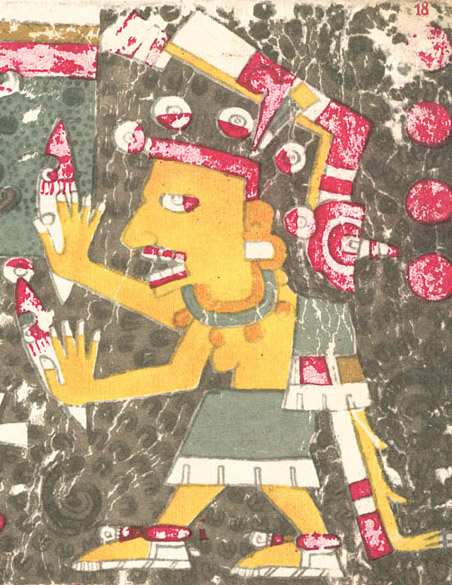
Mictēcacihuātl as depicted in the Codex Borgia

=== Aztec ===
- Cihuateteo (Aztec mythology), Divine women. Spirits of women who died during labor.
- Coatlicue (Aztec mythology), minor goddess of death, as well as the goddess of life and rebirth
- Itztlacoliuhqui (Aztec mythology), personification of winter-as-death
- Mictecacihuatl (Aztec mythology), the chief death goddess; Queen of Mictlan (underworld) or Lady of the Dead
- Mictlantecuhtli (Aztec mythology), the chief death god; lord of the Underworld
- Tlaloc (Aztec mythology), water god and minor death god; ruler of Tlalocan, a separate underworld for those who died from drowning
- Xipe Totec (Aztec mythology), hero god, death god; inventor of warfare and master of plagues
- Xolotl (Aztec mythology), god of sunset, fire, lightning, and death

=== Cahuilla ===
- Muut

=== Guarani ===
- Luison, Guarani mythology

=== Haida ===
- Ta'xet, Haida mythology
- Tia (goddess)

=== Inca ===
- Supay (Inca mythology)
- Vichama (Inca mythology)

=== Inuit ===
- Aipaloovik
- Pana

=== Latin American Folk Catholicism ===
- Santa Muerte, folk saint and goddess of death in Mexico
- San La Muerte, folk saint and god of death in Paraguay, Argentina, and Brazil
- San Pascualito, folk saint and god of death in Guatemala and Mexico

=== Maya ===
- Camazotz, bat god who resides in the underworld
- Cizin
- Ixtab
- Xtabay
- Maya death gods known under various names (Hunhau, Uacmitun Ahau, Ah Puch, Kisin, Yum Kimil)

=== Narragansett ===
- Chepi

=== Taíno ===
- Maquetaurie Guayaba
- Opiel Guabiron

=== Umbanda and Candomblé ===
- Exu caveira
- Exu Tranca-rua das almas

=== Haitian Vodou ===
Gede lwa

- Baron Samedi, Baron La Croix, Baron Cimetiere, Baron Kriminel
- Ghede Nibo
- Maman Brigitte

== See also ==
- Afterlife
- Death (personification)
- Liminal deity
- List of deities
- List of night deities
- List of fictional demons
- List of theological demons
- List of ghosts
- Psychopomp
- Time and fate deities
- Sailor Saturn
- Veneration of the dead
