= Middleworld =

In ancient Maya cosmology, Middleworld is the Earth, or the world of men. "In ancient Maya thought, the universe was suffused with sacredness that resonated from the presence of deities. The ancestors, spirits and deities not only resided in the Upperworld and the Underworld (sometimes called Xibalba), but also shared the Middleworld, or Earth with its human and animal populations." According to Mayan belief, gods occupied the Upperworld and the Underworld, and the middle level consisted of mortal beings. The gods inhabiting the Upper and Underworlds possessed shape-shifting powers to shift into different supernatural realms of time and space, whereas the flow of time and space of the middle level was stuck in one spot. All three levels were joined by the World Tree, a giant ceiba tree which served as the central pole holding the worlds together. The nine levels of the Underworld were represented by the roots, Middleworld by the trunk, and the thirteen heavens of the Skyworld by the branches. This concept is similar to the beliefs held by many ancient cultures, including the Norse, who thought that they inhabited a middle-earth. The Maya also believed that their pyramid temples were sites at which these worlds could be transversed. Maya kings, by undergoing ritual and trance, could open portals which would allow the gods - inhabitants of the sky and under worlds, to communicate with Middleworld. A ritualized game played by the Mayans, referred to as the ballgame, featured a sacred court believed to be a gateway that served as a link between the Middleworld and the Underworld.
