= Ghostlore =

Genre of folklore concerning ghosts

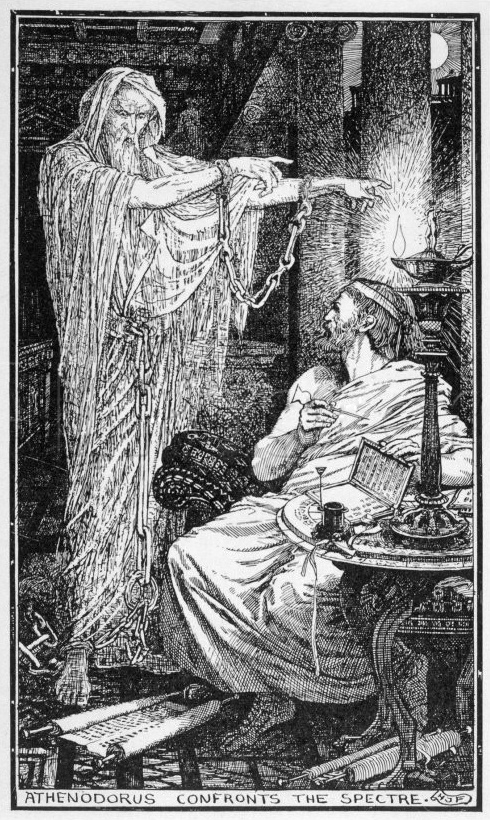
An illustration of Andrew Lang's "Athenodorus confronts the Spectre"

Ghostlore is the body of traditional beliefs and folklore surrounding ghosts and hauntings. Such tales often feature souls of the deceased that are believed to linger in the physical world, either to communicate with the living or to seek vengeance for past wrongs. Ghostlore is a widespread phenomenon, and narratives of hauntings and ghostly encounters are found in cultures around the world.

The term "ghost" eludes a singular definition; its meaning has evolved across cultures, shaped by various interpretations rooted in religious beliefs, folklore, and historical context. Interpretations of ghosts vary based on religious beliefs, cultural values, and historical contexts.

== History ==
The first known recorded story to feature a haunted house is often regarded by folklore scholars as Mostellaria (by the Roman author Plautus), which itself is believed to be an adaptation of a lost ghost story named Phasma written by the Athenian poet Philemon. Several centuries later, in the writings of Pliny the Younger, can be found the second-oldest mention of a haunted house in which the philosopher Athenodorus helps lay the bones of a restless spirit to rest.

The origins of ghostlore can be traced back to ancient beliefs in the afterlife and the existence of spirits. Many ancient cultures, such as the Egyptians and Greeks, believed in the concept of the soul and an afterlife. The Greeks, for example, believed that the soul would be judged after death and either sent to a peaceful afterlife or punished in the underworld.

During the Middle Ages, ghost stories often centered around the idea of restless spirits who were unable to find peace in the afterlife. These spirits were often thought to be the souls of people who had been wronged in life or who had died violent deaths. They were believed to linger in the physical world, haunting the living and seeking revenge on those who had wronged them. These stories were often used to teach moral lessons, with ghosts serving as a warning against bad behavior and the consequences of sin.

Ghostlore continued to evolve during the Renaissance and the Enlightenment, as scientific and rational thought began to challenge traditional beliefs in the supernatural.

In the 19th and early 20th centuries, interest in the paranormal and spiritualism grew, with many people believing in the existence of ghosts and the possibility of communicating with the dead. This led to an increase in ghost stories and other paranormal phenomena, and many people became fascinated with the idea of ghosts and hauntings.

Today, ghostlore remains a popular subject in literature, film, and other forms of media. While scientific explanations for ghosts and hauntings have become more widespread, many people still believe in the existence of ghosts and continue to share ghost stories and legends.

== Types of ghosts ==
Ghosts are a common element of many cultures and traditions around the world, and they come in many different forms. Here are a few of the most common types of ghosts found in ghostlore:

- Vengeful Ghosts: These are ghosts that are believed to have died under unjust or violent circumstances and seek revenge on the living. They are often associated with murder victims or people who were wronged in life.
- Poltergeists: Translates literally from German as "knocking spirit." Poltergeists are ghosts that are believed to be responsible for physical disturbances in a home or other location, such as moving objects or loud noises. They are often depicted as mischievous or malevolent spirits.
- Ghosts of Ancestors: In many cultures, it is believed that the spirits of deceased ancestors continue to play a role in the lives of their living descendants. These ghosts are often honored with offerings or prayers and are believed to provide guidance and protection to their families.
- Ghosts of Children: The spirits of deceased children are often depicted as ghosts in many cultures and are sometimes believed to be especially potent or powerful. In some cases, they are seen as innocent and benevolent beings that bring good luck, while in others they are feared as vengeful or malevolent spirits.
- Ghostly Animals: In some cultures, it is believed that animals can also become ghosts. These ghosts are often associated with the spirits of beloved pets or with animals that played an important role in a community's history or mythology.

== Around the world ==
=== Scotland ===
The Green Lady is a recurring character in many Scottish folktales. This folklore character is often associated with the many castles dotting the countryside. Examples of the green ladies include the Green Lady of Fyvie, Green Lady of Ashintully Castle, Green Lady of Ballindalloch Castle, Green Lady of the Barony of Ladyland, Green Lady of Crathes Castle, and the Green Lady of Knock Castle. The origin of the green lady appears to stem from the Glaistig, which is a type of fuath from Scottish mythology. The Green Lady varies from story to story, in some stories she may act as a type of guardian angel, but in others she takes on the form of a vengeful spirit.

=== Ireland ===
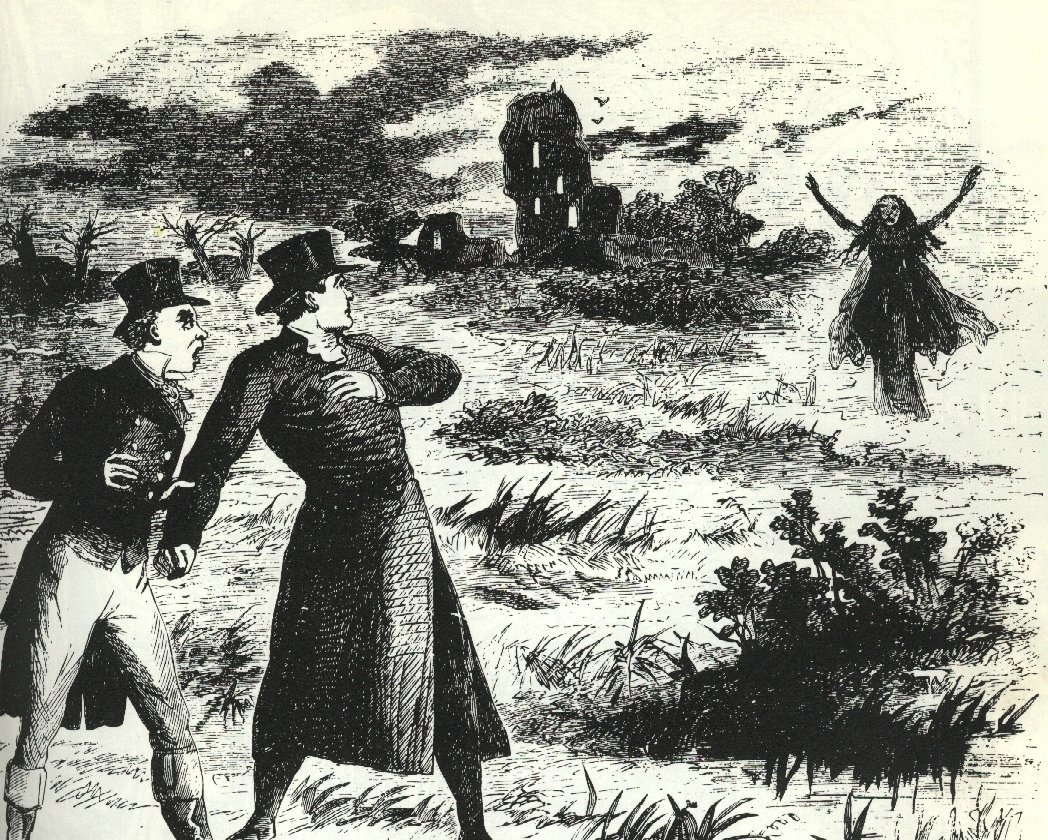
The Banshee Appears (1862)

The Banshee is one of the most well known spirits in Irish folklore. Within these folktales, hearing a banshee's scream is viewed to portend the death of a family member. The banshee's description changes significantly depending on the folktale, with the only consistent details generally being that the banshee is the spirit of a woman with long flowing hair who can be heard loudly keening in the countryside. In some variations of the tale the banshee is thought to be the spirit of a murdered woman or a mother who died in childbirth. The Scottish Bean Nighe is specifically the banshee of a woman who died during childbirth. The banshee is often depicted accompanying the death coach in European folklore.

=== Faroe islands ===
The huldufólk are a race of fairies or elves who are said to live in the mountains, hills, and rocks of the Faroes. They are said to be similar in appearance to humans, but they are much smaller and have pale skin and long, dark hair. The huldufólk are generally benevolent creatures, but they can be mischievous if they are angered. The Huldufólk are an important part of Faroese folklore and culture. They are often featured in stories and legends, and they are said to be real by many Faroese people. The Huldufólk are seen as a symbol of the Faroe Islands' natural beauty and isolation. To many they are also seen as a reminder of the importance of respecting nature and living in harmony with the environment.

=== India ===
India is a land of diverse cultural and religious traditions, and ghostlore has been an integral part of the country's folklore and mythology for centuries. The concept of ghosts, or bhootas, is deeply rooted in Indian culture, and they are often depicted as malevolent spirits that haunt specific locations or individuals. The various cultural practices, such as veneration of ancestors, have played a significant role in shaping Indian ghostlore.

=== Latin America ===
In almost every Latin American country, you can find stories about the Sihuanaba, or horse-faced women. The Sihuanaba is said to lead unfaithful men into dangerous situations. Variations of the story exist, but in almost all of them, the spirit is a type of shapeshifter who exclusively preys on men. Name variations include Cihuanaba, Ciguanaba, and Ciguapa.

La Llorona, or The Wailer, is an extremely widespread folklore story within Latin American countries. Many different versions of the La Llorona story exist, but generally they focus on the spirit's intense grief for her lost children.

=== Ethiopia ===
One of the most famous ghosts in Ethiopian folklore is the Zār which is a type of spirit or demon that is said to possess women. In Ethiopian culture, the Zar is believed to be the cause of many physical and mental illnesses, and people who are believed to be possessed by a Zar are often taken to religious healers for treatment.

=== China ===
'鬼' (Mandarin pinyin: guǐ) is the general Chinese term for ghost which itself is a derivative of the verb "wei 威", which means "awe inspiring". Belief in ghosts in China is widespread and is often closely associated with ancestor worship. Ghosts have been the subject of censorship in China at various times.

=== United States ===
Resurrection Mary, a "vanishing hitchhiker" is considered to be Chicago's most famous ghost. Some ghost stories in Alabama can be traced to the folklore of the Choctaw. As many of the state's early settlers were of Scotch-Irish heritage, their tales contain a number of European motifs. According to Jones, ghostlore is more prominent in rural areas. New York state's ghostlore is most readily found the state's earliest settled region: either side of the Hudson River from Newburgh to Troy, and along the Mohawk Valley from Cohoes to Utica. Jones argues that "[f]or ghostlore to thrive one needs a section that has been settled for a considerable length of time, where the houses are old, and at least a fair share of the population is permanent."

=== Nigeria ===
Nigeria has a rich cultural heritage that includes a vast array of ghost stories and beliefs. In Nigerian culture, ghosts are considered as a manifestation of the spirit world and are often believed to have a significant impact on the living. Ghost stories in Nigeria vary from region to region and are influenced by the diverse ethnic and religious backgrounds of its people. Many of these stories reflect the fears, values, and traditions of the Nigerian people. One of the most well-known Nigerian ghost stories is that of the Abiku, a malevolent spirit that is said to be responsible for the repeated deaths of a family's newborn children. The Abiku is believed to be a restless and mischievous spirit that enjoys tormenting families. To prevent an Abiku from returning, families will sometimes resort to extreme measures such as burning the child's body or burying it under a large rock. The story of the Abiku highlights the importance of family and community in Nigerian culture, as the Abiku's attacks are often seen as a test of the family's strength and resilience.

=== Ghana ===
Ghana has a long history of ghost folklore and beliefs. In the Akan culture, a 'ghost' is a malevolent spirit from Asamando, which haunt and eat humans, although they are not always aggressive, but are rarely benevolent. They are believed to be unable to eat pepper, so someone avoiding consuming pepper is supposedly a sign of being a ghost.

=== Russia ===
Russian ghostlore is a complex tradition that reflects the country's history and culture. Most tales involve Christian beliefs and themes, such as the torment of unrepentant souls. Popular traditional ghosts include the domovoy, a household spirit, and the rusalka, a female water spirit.

== Locations ==
Specific locations that are associated with death or tragedy often gain a local reputation for being haunted more quickly than more benign places. As a result, these locations appear disproportionately within ghostlore. Some examples of these locations include hospitals, asylums, battlefields, cemeteries, and sites of natural disasters or tragic accidents. These places are often imbued with a sense of sadness and loss, which can contribute to their reputation as haunted locations.

=== Cemeteries ===
Cemeteries often quickly become the subject of many ghost stories and frequently appear in the recorded folklore from all over the world. Popular local examples of cemeteries that have gained a reputation within folklore for being haunted include Bachelor's Grove Cemetery, Chase Vault, Jeruk Purut Cemetery, and Union Cemetery.

=== College campuses ===
The architecture of many older buildings on college campuses often resembles that of buildings described in nineteenth-century literary ghost stories and Gothic novels. These buildings subsequently become the setting for ghostly legends and tales of hauntings.

According to professor Elizabeth Tucker the stories serve to "initiate entering students into a new community". In this way, ghostlore on college campuses serves not only to entertain and frighten, but also to create a sense of shared history and tradition among students.

The emotional impact of these stories may be attributed to the association of college campuses with youth and discovery, as well as the potential for tragedy and loss inherent in the transition to adulthood.

In the context of ghostlore, some of the most reputedly haunted college campuses in the United States include Ohio University in Athens, Ohio, Smith College in Northampton, Massachusetts, and Gettysburg College in Gettysburg, Pennsylvania.

At Ohio University, for example, the Athens Lunatic Asylum operated right across the street from the university until 1993. It has since been the source of many strange sightings and tales of hauntings. The university is also known for a haunted dorm in Wilson Hall, Room 428 is especially noted. Students who stayed in the room reported objects flying off shelves and shattering against walls, and the door slamming open and shut repeatedly.

At Smith College, which has been around since 1871 and still maintains Colonial-era buildings, local lore is full of ghost stories. The college even has an online encyclopedia cataloging its ghost stories. The most famous story takes place in Sessions House, built in 1751. During the Revolutionary War, a British Army general was held prisoner at the house by an American lieutenant. The general fell in love with the lieutenant's daughter, and they met on a staircase hidden in the house. Though they were parted during their lifetime, rumor has it that the ghostly lovers can still be found on the secret staircase.

=== Castles ===
Haunted castles are an iconic and enduring element of ghostlore folklore. These imposing structures, often centuries old, are said to be haunted by the spirits of those who once inhabited them and are the subject of countless ghost stories and legends. Castles were once the centers of power and authority in medieval Europe, serving as the homes of kings, queens, and nobles, as well as the sites of battles and political intrigue. As such, they are often associated with a sense of mystery and power, and their ruins continue to fascinate and captivate people today. The ghosts that are said to haunt castles are often believed to be the spirits of former inhabitants or visitors who died tragic or violent deaths, such as prisoners or soldiers who perished during wars or battles. These spirits are said to linger in the halls and rooms of the castle, sometimes reenacting the events that led to their deaths or simply making their presence known through unexplained phenomena such as strange noises, cold spots, or apparitions.

Countless books, films, and television shows have featured haunted castles as their settings, and they continue to be a popular theme in horror and fantasy genres. This fascination with haunted castles has helped to keep the legends and stories surrounding them alive and well, even in the modern era.

=== Highways ===
The haunted highway is a recurring theme in many folklore tales from all over the globe. One of the best examples from the United States of America is Clinton Road in New Jersey, but there are many others. In more rural areas the haunted highway will take on the form of a haunted street, road, or even trails. Examples of roads around the globe with attached ghostlore include the Kuala Lumpur–Karak Expressway, A21 Sevenoaks Bypass, and the Tuen Mun Road.

=== Railroads ===
A particular subset of ghostlore is that concerning the railroad and the ghost train. These tales often feature ghosts of former passengers or railway workers who met tragic ends on the tracks. Notable examples of reputedly haunted railroads include the Silver Train of Stockholm, Sweden, the Lincoln Funeral Train in the United States, and the St. Louis Ghost Train in Saskatchewan, Canada. The idea of a ghost train or haunted railroad may also evoke feelings of nostalgia for a bygone era of transportation and the romance of train travel. Additionally, the isolation and remoteness of many railroad tracks may contribute to the eerie atmosphere and sense of mystery surrounding these tales.

=== Hospitals ===
Hospitals are a prevalent setting for ghost stories and haunted location folklore worldwide. These tales often feature ghosts of former patients or staff members who act as vengeful spirits of those who died in the hospital or seek to inflict suffering from beyond the grave. Notable examples of reputedly haunted hospitals include Ararat Lunatic Asylum in Australia, Nummela Sanatorium in Finland, and Changi Hospital in Singapore. While many of these haunted hospitals are mental health facilities, there are also numerous general hospitals with a reputation for being haunted. The prevalence of hospitals as a setting for ghost stories may be attributed to the association of hospitals with death and suffering, as well as the emotional impact of illness and loss on both patients and their loved ones.

=== Bathrooms ===
The haunted bathroom subgenre of ghostlore is a popular cultural trope. This subgenre has become particularly prominent in contemporary media and literary works and is a powerful symbol in our cultural imagination. One of the most well-known examples is Moaning Myrtle from the Harry Potter book series. Through the haunted bathroom trope, primal fears and anxieties related to vulnerability and the unknown are explored, and complex themes related to identity, mortality, and the human experience are addressed.

=== Beaches ===
These stories commonly feature ghosts or supernatural entities that haunt beaches, lighthouses, or other coastal locations, these narratives can intersect with other subgenres of folklore such as the "lost treasure" motif. The overlap between haunted beach and lost treasure stories can likely be traced back to the long history of piracy and shipwrecks along coastlines. Many of these stories feature pirates or sailors who buried their treasure on a nearby beach before being killed or captured, and the ghosts of these men are said to haunt the area in search of their lost wealth. These stories have been retold and adapted over time, and continue to be a popular subgenre of ghostlore. Examples of haunted beaches include St. Augustine Beach and Nags head.

=== Battlefields ===
Haunted battlefields are a common theme in ghostlore, often attributed to the violent deaths and residual energy left behind from the conflict. The belief in ghosts and the paranormal is a cultural phenomenon found in many societies, and the stories surrounding haunted battlefields reflect this belief. These tales often serve as a way to commemorate the lives lost in the conflict and to keep the memory of the battles alive. Some of the most famous haunted battlefields include the Gettysburg battlefield in Pennsylvania, which saw over 50,000 casualties during the Civil War and is said to be haunted by soldiers still fighting the battle. The battlefields of Waterloo in Belgium, the site of Napoleon's final defeat, are also believed to be haunted by the ghosts of soldiers. Other notable examples include the battlefield of Culloden in Scotland, where the final Jacobite uprising took place, and the site of the Battle of Bosworth in England, where King Richard III was killed.

=== Forests ===
Haunted forests have been a staple of ghostlore across many cultures. These forests are often depicted as places of darkness, danger, and fear. They represent the unknown, and the fear of the unknown, and serve as a metaphor for the wild and untamed aspects of nature that are beyond human control. Some popular examples of haunted forests include Aokigahara Forest in Japan, the Black Forest in Germany, and Hoia Forest in Romania.

== Religion ==
Religion and ghostlore have a long and intertwined history, with many cultures incorporating beliefs about spirits and supernatural beings into their religious practices. The overlap between religion and ghostlore can be seen in the many rituals, myths, and stories that involve interactions with the spirit world. In many religions, there is a belief in an afterlife, where the soul or spirit of a person continues to exist after death. This belief often includes the idea that the spirits of the dead can return to the living world, either to seek revenge, offer guidance, or simply to visit loved ones. Many religious traditions have specific rituals or practices for honoring and communicating with these spirits.

In some religions, such as Hinduism and Buddhism, the belief in reincarnation is closely tied to the idea of ghosts. According to these traditions, a person's soul or spirit is reborn into a new body after death, but sometimes, the soul may become trapped in the world of the living as a ghost. In these cases, it is believed that the soul must be released through specific rituals or prayers. In other religious traditions, ghosts are seen as malevolent beings that must be avoided or repelled. For example, in many Indigenous religions, such as those found in the Americas and Australia, there is a belief in malevolent spirits that can cause harm or illness to humans. These spirits are often seen as a result of negative actions taken by humans, such as breaking taboos or disrespecting sacred places.

== Observations ==
American folklorist Louis C. Jones observed the following in 1944:

Ghostlore is still widespread and popular. While most of the actions thought to be common among ghosts (chain clanking, cemetery haunting, and so forth) can be found, they are by no means so widespread in the popular ghostlore as we have been led to expect. The ghost who is very like the living is far more common than any other... It might be expected that a rational age of science would destroy belief in the ability of the dead to return. I think it works the other way: in an age of scientific miracles anything seems possible.

Jones lists several reasons why ghosts return and interact with the living. Among these are to complete unfinished business, to warn and inform, to punish and protest, to guard and protect, and to reward the living. Folklorist Linda Dégh observed in her 2001 work Legend and belief the following:

The legend touches upon the most sensitive areas of our existence, and its manifest forms cannot be isolated as simple coherent stories. Rather, legends appear as products of conflicting opinions, expressed in conversation. They manifest in discussions, contradictions, additions, implementations, corrections, approvals, and disapprovals during some or all phases of their transmission, from their inception through various courses of elaboration, variation, decline, and revitalization.

Stories often draw from the general history of an area or from specific historical incidents. Researcher Alan Brown believes that "[t]he association between ghosts and dilapidated houses is conventional." Brown notes that some stories cease to be passed down once the setting has been significantly altered, as in the case of a "haunted house" demolished.

== Sources ==
- Jones, Louis C. (1944). "The Ghosts of New York: An Analytical Study". The Journal of American Folklore. 57 (226): 237–254. doi:10.2307/535356. JSTOR 535356.
- Lang, Andrew (1911). "Hauntings" . In Chisholm, Hugh (ed.). Encyclopædia Britannica. Vol. 13 (11th ed.). Cambridge University Press. pp. 67–68. This gives a contemporaneous account of beliefs as noted above in the History section.

== See also ==
- Ghost stories
