= Uay =

Uay or UAY may refer to:

- Wayob, Maya word for sleep
- Genetic code for tyrosine
