= Cizin =

Maya god of death and earthquakes

- God of death
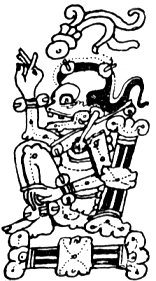
- Other names: Kisin, Ah Puch, Xibalba, Yum Cimil, Hunhau, Ah Puchah, Au Puch, Cum Hau, Eopuco, Hu Ahau, Tzontemoc, Ahpuch, and Ahal Puch.

Cizin (also Kisen or Kisin) is a Maya god of death and earthquakes. He is the most important Maya death god in the Maya culture. Scholars call him God A.

To the Yucatán Mayas he was Hun-Came and Vucub-Came. He also has similarities to Mictlāntēcutli.

== Name and etymology ==
The God Cizin goes by several names like Ah Puch, Xibalba, Yom Cimil, Yum Cimil, Hunhau, Ah Puchah, Au Puch, Cum Hau, Eopuco, Hu Ahau, Tzontemoc, Ahpuch, and Ahal Puch. He was sometimes called Kimi. Maya today call him Yum Cim or Yum Cimil.

The name Cizin probably means stench. It is derived from the Yucatec Maya root "ciz" which means flatulence or a foul stench. His name could also have been a title, Stinking One, as he was believed to smell of decay.

Yum Cimil means lord of death while Hun Ahau means one ruler. Ah Puch means to melt.

== Mythology ==
He is considered the brother of Nohochacyum and Bacabs.

According to Lacandon myth when a person dies Cizin burns the soul on his mouth and his anus. When the soul complains Cizin douses the soul in cold water, causing the soul to complain more leading Cizin to burn them until the soul disintegrates into nothing. Then, it is believed the soul goes to the god Sucunyum, who spits in his hand to clean the soul, allowing the soul to go where it pleases.

== In popular culture ==
- Cizin, under the name Ah Pook, is used as a title for the William S. Burroughs book Ah Pook Is Here (1979).
- Cizin, under the name Ah Puch, appears in the Ben 10 episode "Ultimate Weapon" (2006) as the guardian of the Sword of Ek Chuaj.
- Cizin, under the name Ah Pook, appears in the default Golarion setting of the Pathfinder Roleplaying Game (2009) as a god of death and destruction. He is primarily known in the continent of Arcadia, analogous to the pre-Columbian Americas.
- Cizin appears in the video game 9 Clues: The Secret of Serpent Creek (2013), where he is central to the supernatural mystery plot.
- Cizin, under the name Ah Puch, appears as a playable character in Smite (2014).
- Cizin, under the name Ah Puch, appears as the main antagonist in the 2018 novel The Storm Runner by J. C. Cervantes, and a supporting protagonist in the sequels.
- Cizin, under the name Ah Puch, appears in Maya and the Three (2021), voiced by Rita Moreno.
