= Amokye =

Ashanti goddess

In the religious traditions of the Akan people and the Ashanti people of Ghana, Amokye is the woman who guards the entrance to the other world, which is called Asamando (the Land of the Dead). She is the woman who welcomes the souls of dead individuals to the otherworld. According to the beliefs, Ashanti people were dressed for bury in amoasie (loincloths) and jewelry, which they gave to Amokye as payment for allowing them to Asamando.
