= Kay Amert =

Kay Amert (November 11, 1947 – September 5, 2008) was an American scholar of French Renaissance printing and a typographer and letterpress printer. She was the director of the University of Iowa Typography Library from 1972 to 2006 where she was a professor in the School of Journalism and Mass Communication.

== Life and career ==
Kay Amert was born on November 11, 1947, in Madison, South Dakota. Amert attended the University of Iowa in 1966 where she created her own private press imprint, the Seamark Press. Its first book was Holding Action, a compilation of poems by Sam Hamond which was published in 1969. Seamark press published thirteen more books containing work of American poets over the next sixteen years. She was the director of the University of Iowa Typography Library from 1972 to 2006 where she was also a professor in the School of Journalism and Mass Communication. Amert received the Collegiate Teaching Award. She died of cancer on September 5, 2008. Robert Bringhurst edited her research into a book The Scythe and the Rabbit: Simon de Colines and the Culture of the Book in Renaissance Paris which was published posthumously in 2012.
