= Robert Bringhurst =

Canadian poet, typographer and author (born 1946)

Robert Bringhurst OC
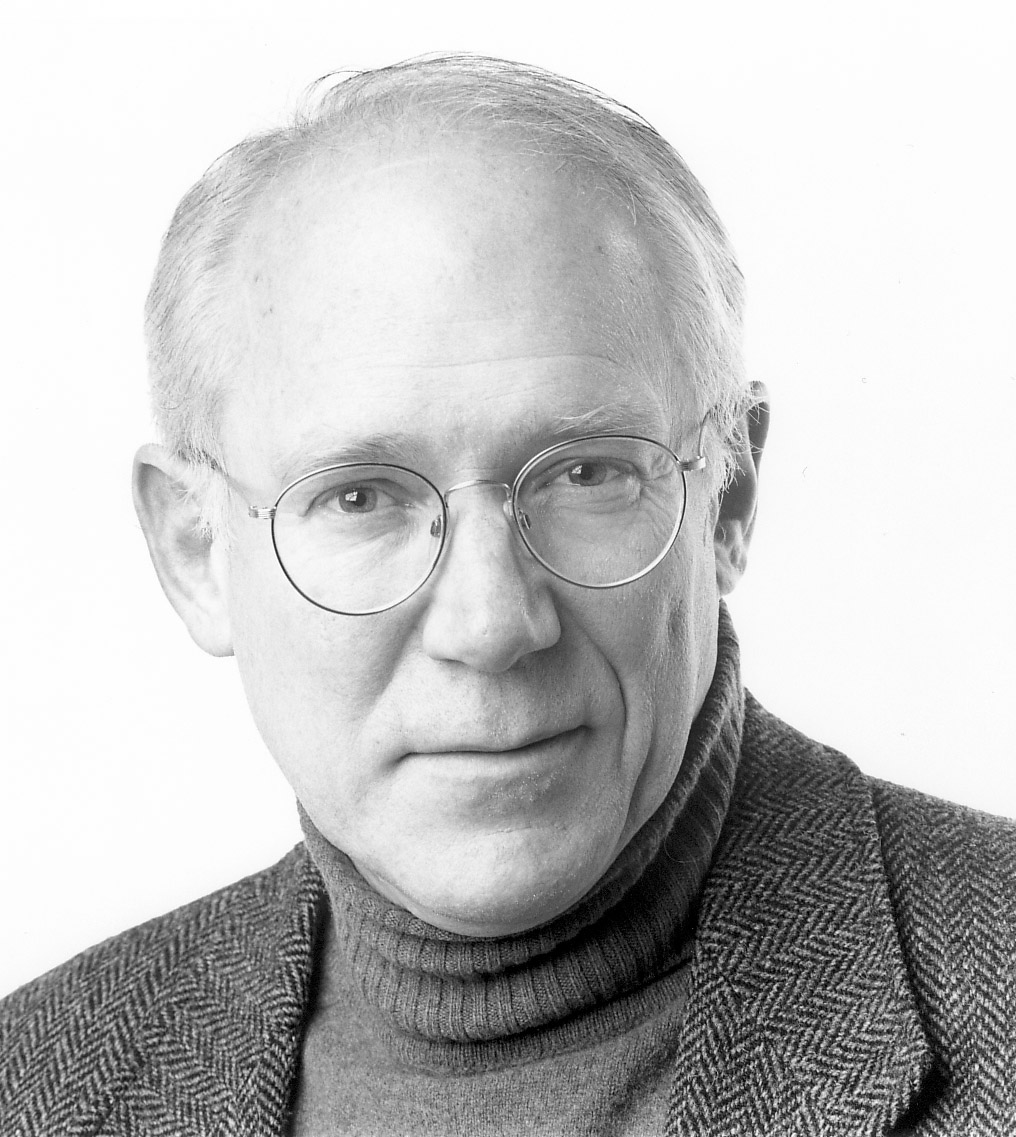
- Bringhurst in 2016
- Born: October 16, 1946 (age 80); Los Angeles, California, US
- Education: Indiana University, Bloomington; University of British Columbia
- Occupations: Poet; typographer; writer
- Notable work: The Elements of Typographic Style (1992)
- Spouse: Jan Zwicky

Robert Bringhurst OC (born 1946) is a Canadian poet, typographer and author. He has translated substantial works from Haida and Navajo and from classical Greek and Arabic. He wrote The Elements of Typographic Style, a reference book of typefaces, glyphs and the visual and geometric arrangement of type. He was named an Officer of the Order of Canada in June 2013.

He lives on Quadra Island, near Campbell River, British Columbia (approximately 170 km northwest of Vancouver) with his wife, Jan Zwicky, a poet and philosopher.

== Life ==
Bringhurst was born on October 16, 1946, in Los Angeles, California, and raised in Utah, Montana, Wyoming, Alberta, and British Columbia. He studied architecture, linguistics, and physics at the Massachusetts Institute of Technology, and comparative literature and philosophy at the University of Utah. He holds a BA from Indiana University (1973) and an MFA in creative writing from the University of British Columbia (1975). In 2006, he was awarded an honorary doctorate from the University of the Fraser Valley, and in 2016 was awarded an honorary Doctorate of Letters by Simon Fraser University.

Bringhurst taught literature, art history and history of typography at several universities and held fellowships from the Canada Council for the Arts, the Social Sciences and Humanities Research Council of Canada, the American Philosophical Society, and the Guggenheim Foundation.

== Literary career ==
His 1992 publication, The Elements of Typographic Style was praised as "the finest book ever written about typography" by the type designers Jonathan Hoefler and Tobias Frere-Jones. A collection of his poetry, The Beauty of the Weapons, was short-listed for a Governor General's Award in 1982, and A Story as Sharp as a Knife, his work on Haida oral literature, was nominated for a Governor General's Award in 2000. Bringhurst won the Lieutenant Governor's Award for Literary Excellence in 2005, an award which recognizes British Columbia writers who have contributed to the development of literary excellence in the province. His Collected Poems was published in 2026.

=== Work in Haida ===
Bringhurst has a strong interest in linguistics, translating works from classical Greek, Arabic, Navajo, and, most significantly, Haida. His interest in Haida culture stems from his friendship and close association with the influential Haida artist Bill Reid, with whom he wrote The Raven Steals the Light in 1984, among several other significant collaborations. It was this friendship that in 1987 "started Bringhurst on the philanthropic endeavour of recording the Haida canon". The result of this labour was a trilogy of works collectively titled Masterworks of the Classical Haida Mythtellers. The essays in its first volume, A Story As Sharp As A Knife, and particularly its nineteenth chapter, "The Prosody of Meaning," constitute an important contribution to the understanding of the poetics of oral literatures.

His translations from Haida have been viewed as an attempt to preserve the Haida culture, which in 1991 was considered part of a group "likely to be lost unless strong efforts are made very quickly to perpetuate them". The Haida translation has caused some controversy. Bringhurst was accused of academic exploitation and cultural appropriation. In 2001, the CBC Radio program Ideas aired a two part series called "Land to Stand On." The series' first episode featured "a string of Haida claiming [...] that Bringhurst's work is 'about keeping us in our place,' written 'without asking us,'" and "replete with 'serious errors twisting it into the poetry that he wants'".

In 1999, The Globe and Mail published a report on the Haida reaction to A Story as Sharp as a Knife by Adele Weder. Weder's piece was later criticized for citing only two Haida sources, claiming they could speak for the entire Haida community, and was described as an "inflammatory article ... not likely to be mistaken for exemplary journalism". The Globe and Mail published Bringhurst's response, which was later called "considerably more measured".

In 2001, Jeff Leer reviewed A Story as Sharp as a Knife saying Bringhurst has neither formal linguistic education nor significant experience with spoken Haida, and doubting Bringhurst's ability to translate from Haida. Leer's review compared Bringhurst's work unfavourably to Enrico's Skidegate Haida Myths and Histories, and referred to the Weder review as an authoritative source. Leer's publisher, the International Journal of American Linguistics, retracted the review and apologized to Bringhurst for publishing:

some unfounded statements from another author that might be read to impugn Prof. Bringhurst's qualifications or integrity. The Journal's sole intention in publishing the book review was to bring an important work by a well-respected scholar to the attention of its readers. [...] it was not the Journal's intent to transmit erroneous perceptions of Prof. Bringhurst's training or scholarship.

Most academic discussion and recognition of Bringhurst's work in Haida has been positive. Linguist Dell Hymes wrote a review of the Masterworks of the Classical Haida Mythtellers trilogy (of which A Story as Sharp as a Knife is part) in Language in Society, praising the trilogy. He said it "should become a classic reference point" for Haida scholars in the future. In 2004, Bringhurst won the Edward Sapir Prize for Masterworks of the Classical Haida Mythtellers. awarded by the Society for Linguistic Anthropology, a professional organization. The committee giving the award was headed by Leanne Hinton, an expert in American Indian languages, and chair of the Department of Linguistics at the University of California, Berkeley.

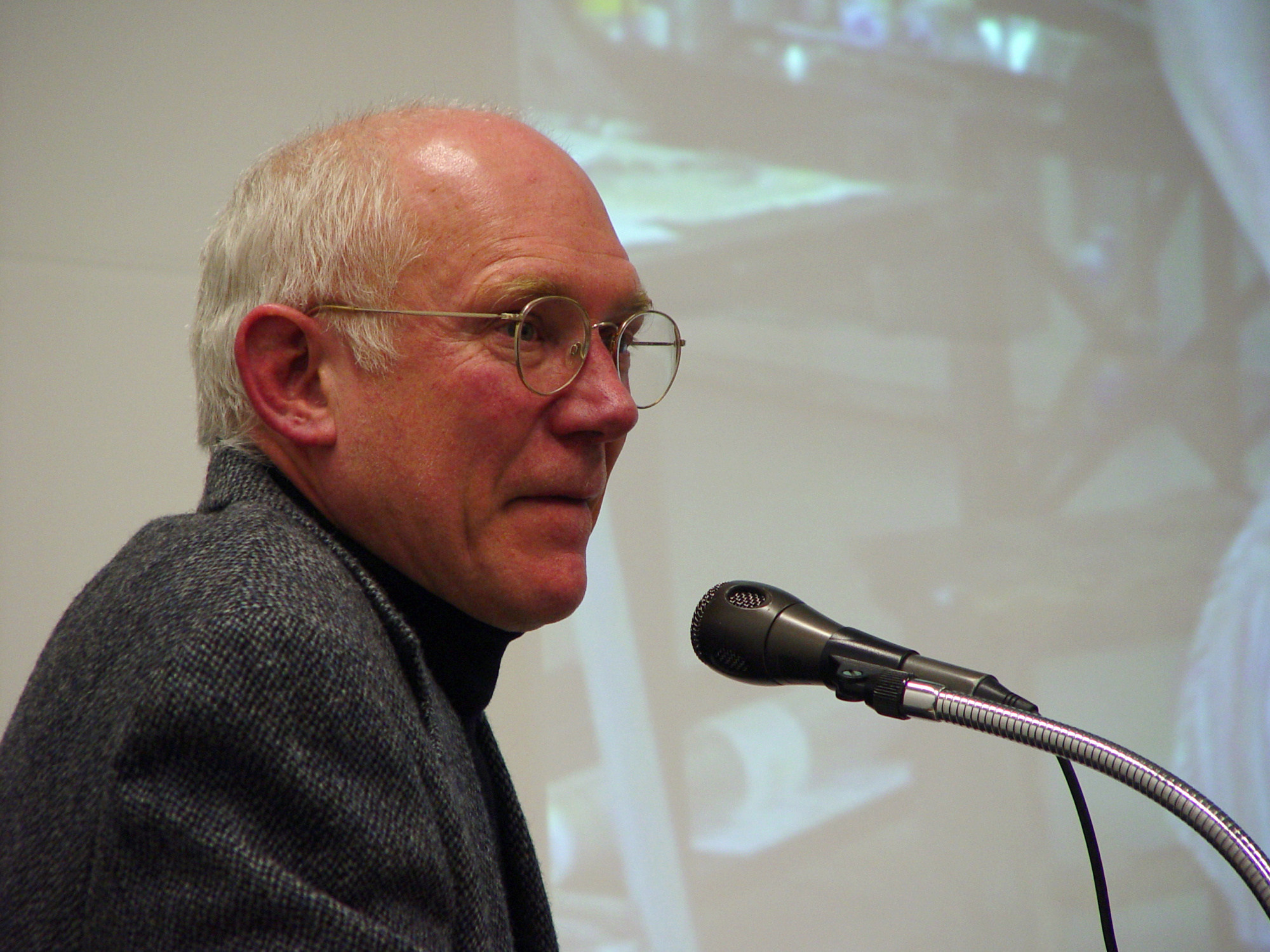
Bringhurst in 2006

Bringhurst has been defended by Margaret Atwood, who says that "territorial squabbling cannot obscure the fact that Bringhurst's achievement is gigantic as well as heroic", and that far from appropriating native voices, Masterworks of the Classical Haida Mythtellers "restores to life two exceptional poets we ought to know". The CBC documentary was attacked in print for relying "entirely on the fallacy, convenient to the producers, that Bringhurst had not consulted with any Haida". Bringhurst with the help of Bill Reid had spent the better part of the previous decade working with members of the Haida community. People from other indigenous Canadian communities, such as the late Cree elder Wilna Hodgson have also defended Bringhurst. In a letter to the editor of Books in Canada, she called A Story as Sharp as a Knife "a gift to First Nation people across [Canada]", and a true "masterpiece in the growing genre of spoken texts". In her opinion, Bringhurst's "efforts are clearly informed with the kind of integrity that all translators might strive to emulate".

Bringhurst says that "culture is not genetic" and that he pays respect to Native American languages like Haida by allowing works from those languages to be appreciated as art by as wide an audience as possible. He says he always intended his translations to be "[exercises] in literary history, not in the interpretation of present-day Haida culture".

== Bibliography ==
=== Poetry ===
- The Shipwright's Log, 1972 (Kanchenjunga Press)
- Cadastre, 1973 (Kanchenjunga Press)
- Deuteronomy, 1974 (Sono Nis Press, Delta, British Columbia, Canada)
- Eight Objects, 1975 (Kanchenjunga Press)
- Bergschrund, 1975 (Sono Nis Press)
- Tzuhalem's Mountain, 1982 (Oolichan Books)
- The Beauty of the Weapons: Selected Poems 1972–82, 1982 (McClelland & Stewart; Copper Canyon Press), nominated for a Governor General's Award; 1985 (Copper Canyon Press)
- Tending the Fire, 1985 (Alcuin Society)
- The Blue Roofs of Japan, 1986 (Barbarian Press)
- Pieces of Map, Pieces of Music, 1986, 1987 (Copper Canyon Press)
- Conversations with a Toad, with woodcuts by Lucie Lambert & Masato Arikushi, 1987 (Lucie Lambert)
- The Calling: Selected Poems 1970–1995, 1995 (McClelland & Stewart)
- Elements, with drawings by Ulf Nilsen, 1995 (Russell Maret)
- The Book of Silences, with photographs by Carolee Campbell, 2001 (Ninja Press)
- Ursa Major, 2003 (Gapereau Press), short-listed for the 2004 Dorothy Livesay Poetry Prize
- New World Suite Number Three: A Poem in Four Movements for Three Voices, 2006 (Center for Book Arts, NYC)
- The Old in Their Knowing, 2005 (Peter Rutledge Koch)
- Selected Poems, 2009 (Gaspereau Press, Canada)
- Selected Poems, 2010 (Jonathan Cape, UK)
- Selected Poems, 2012 (Copper Canyon Press, USA)
- Stopping By, with etchings by Caroline Saltzwedel, 2012 (Hirundo Press)
- Going Down Singing, with aquatints by Joseph Goldyne, 2016 (Two Ponds Press)
- Ten Poems with One Title, with wood engravings by Richard Wagener, 2022 (Barbarian Press)
- The Ridge, 2023 (Harbour Publishing)
- In the Beginning, with wood engravings by Richard Wagener, 2025 (Mixolydian Editions)
- Collected Poems, 2026 (Harbour Publishing)

=== Prose ===
- Ocean/Paper/Stone, 1984 (William Hoffer)
- The Raven Steals the Light, with Bill Reid, 1984 (Douglas & McIntyre)
- Shovels, Shoes and the Slow Rotation of Letters, 1986 (Alcuin Society)
- The Black Canoe: Bill Reid and the Spirit of Haida Gwaii, with photographs by Ulli Steltzer, 1991 (Douglas & McIntyre)
- The Elements of Typographic Style, 1992; revised 1996; 2004, 2005, and 2008; 2012, 2015, and 2016 (Hartley & Marks)
- Boats Is Saintlier Than Captains: Thirteen Ways of Looking at Morality, Language, and Design, 1997 (Russell Maret)
- Native American Oral Literatures and the Unity of the Humanities, 1998
- A Short History of the Printed Word, 2nd ed., with Warren Chappell, 1999 (Hartley & Marks)
- A Story as Sharp as a Knife: The Classical Haida Mythtellers and Their World, 1999 (Douglas & McIntyre / University of Nebraska Press); 2nd ed., 2011 (Douglas & McIntyre); UK ed., with screen prints by Don Yeomans, 2015 (Folio Society)
- The Solid Form of Language: An Essay on Writing and Meaning, 2004 (Gaspereau Press)
- Prosodies of Meaning: Literary Form in Native North America, 2004 (Voices of Rupert's Land, U of Manitoba)
- Wild Language, 2006 (Institute for Coastal Research, Nanaimo)
- The Tree of Meaning: Thirteen Talks, 2006 (Gaspereau Press; Counterpoint)
- Everywhere Being Is Dancing, 2007 (Gaspereau Press; Counterpoint)
- The Surface of Meaning: Books and Book Design in Canada, 2008 (CCSP)
- What Is Reading For?, 2011 (Cary Graphic Arts Press / Rochester Institute of Technology)
- The Typographic Legacy of Ludovico degli Arrighi, 2016 (Peter Koch)
- Palatino: The Natural History of a Typeface, 2016 (Book Club of California; David Godine)
- Learning to Die, with Jan Zwicky, 2018 (U of Regina Press)
- This Wisp of a Thing Called Civilization, 2023 (Russell Maret)
- Buying the Ghosts a Drink: Eleven Conversations with Robert Bringhurst, edited by Franklin Cheng, 2026 (Gaspereau Press, Canada / Watershed Press, USA)

=== Translation ===
- Volumes 2 and 3 of the trilogy Masterworks of the Classical Haida Mythtellers (volume 1, A Story as Sharp as a Knife, is a prose work about Haida literature and is not primarily a work of translation)
  - Ghandl of the Qayahl Llaanas, Nine Visits to the Mythworld (a collection of stories by the mythteller Ghandl, as collected in 1900 by John Reed Swanton), 2000, short-listed for the 2001 Canadian Griffin Poetry Prize; 2nd ed., 2023 (Douglas & McIntyre)
  - Skaay of the Qquuna Qiighawaay, Being in Being: The Collected Works of a Master Haida Mythteller (a collection of stories by the mythteller Skaay, as collected by John Reed Swanton), 2001; 2nd ed., 2023 (Douglas & McIntyre)
- Parmenides, The Fragments, with wood engravings by Richard Wagener, 2003 (Peter Koch)
- Skaay of the Qquuna Qiighawaay, Siixha/Floating Overhead: The Qquna Cycle §3.3, 2007 (Russell Maret)
- Michelangelo, Hard, High-Country Poems, 2016 (Peter Koch)

=== Edited works ===
- Visions: Contemporary Art in Canada, 1983 (Douglas & McIntyre)
- Jan Tschichold, The Form of the Book: Essays on the Morality of Good Design, 1991 (Hartley & Marks)
- Bill Reid, Solitary Raven: The Essential Writings, 2000; 2nd ed., 2009 (Douglas & McIntyre)
- Carving the Elements: A Companion to the Fragments of Parmenides, 2004 (Peter Koch)
- François Mandeville, This Is What They Say, translated from Chipewyan by Ron Scollon, 2009 (Douglas & McIntyre)
- Kay Amert, The Scythe and the Rabbit: Simon de Colines and the Culture of the Book in Renaissance Paris, 2012 (Cary Graphic Arts Press / RIT)
- Dennis Lee, Heart Residence: Collected Poems 1967–2017, 2017 (Anansi)

=== Commentary ===
- William Meads, “The Holes in the Stone,” 1977: Kayak 44 (Santa Cruz, Calif.): pp 60–65.
- Stephen Spender, Journals 1939–1983, ed. John Goldsmith [entry from 1982] (London: Faber & Faber, 1985): pp 442–443.
- Robin Skelton, “Recent Canadian Poetry,” 1984: Poetry (Chicago) 144.5 (1984): pp 297–307.
- Jorie Graham, “Making Connections,” 1986: New York Times Book Review, September 28, 1986: pp 32–33.
- Calvin Luther Martin, In the Spirit of the Earth: Rethinking Time and History. 1992 (Baltimore: Johns Hopkins University Press, 1992): chapters 4–6.
- Iain Higgins, "Robert Bringhurst," Encyclopedia of Litersature in Canada, edited by W. H. New, 2002: University of Toronto Press: pp 152–154.
- Margaret Atwood, "Uncovered: An American Iliad," 2004: The Times (London), February 28, 2004: Weekend Review pp 10–11. Reprinted with revisions in Atood, Writing with Intent: Essays, Reviews, Personal Prose 1983–2005 (New York: Carroll & Graf, 2005): pp 346–351.
- Noah Richler, This Is My Country, What’s Yours?: A Literary Atlas of Canada, 2006 (Toronto: McClelland & Stewart, 2006): pp 48–54, 82–83, etc.
- Nicholas Bradley, "Remembering Offence: Robert Bringhurst and the Ethical Challenge of Cultural Appropriation," 2007: University of Toronto Quarterly 76.3: pp 890–912.
- Rebcca Raglon, “The Natural History of Language and Literature,” 2008: Canadian Literature 196: pp 127–128.
- John Burnside, “It’s language that matters,” 2010: The Times (London), August 21, 2010: Saturday Review p 11.
- Kate Kellaway, “Masterpieces from Canada’s Best-Kept Secret,” 2010: The Observer (London), September 19, 2010: New Review p 41.
- Margaret Atwood, "Robert Bringhurst and the Rediscovery of the Haida Mythtellers," 2015: New Statesman, September 30, 2015: pp 54–57. (Actually a reprint of Atwood's foreword to the UK edition of Bringhurst's A Story as Sharp as a Knife, (London: Folio Society, 2015).
- Listening for the Heartbeat of Being: The Arts of Robert Bringhurst, edited by Brent Wood and Mark Dickinson, 2015 (McGill-Queen's U Press).
- Robert Fulford, “Bringing a Genius Out of the Shadows.” The National Post (Toronto), August 23, 2016: pp B1, B3.
- Paul Watkins, "When Voices Intertwine," 2016: Canadian Literature 228–229 (Spring/Summer 2016): pp 264–266.
- Leonor María Martínez Serrano, Breathing Earth: The Polyphonic Lyric of Robert Bringhurst, 2021 (Peter Lang).
- Mark Dickinson, Canadian Primal, 2021 (McGill-Queen's U Press).
- Nicholas Bradley, "North of Carmel: Jeffers, Bringhurst, and the Ecological View," 2023: Canadian Review of American Studies 53(2), 141–157.
