= Tia (goddess) =

Figure in Haida mythology

Tia is the goddess of peaceful death in the Haida mythology. She is considered to be part of a duality. Her counterpart is Ta'xet, the Haida God of violent death.
