= Skaay =

Canadian Haida storyteller, born c. 1827

Skaay was a blind, crippled storyteller of the Haida village of Ttanuu born c. 1827 at Qquuna. Skaay could neither read nor write, but his stories of Haida mythology have survived in the form of written transcriptions taken down by John Swanton with the aide of Henry Moody over the winter of 1900. These transcriptions of myths are unique in the literature, both for their fidelity (due to Swanton) to the precise wordings of the mythteller, and for the survival of the pre-translation originals.

The stories Skaay chose to dictate are the Qquuna Cycle, the longest poem recorded in Haida, Qquuna Qiighawaay, the oral history of Skaay's family, and Raven Travelling, Skaay's original take on the well-worn tale (see Raven Tales).

Skaay appears three times in church records: first, in 1884 when he was baptized "Robert McKay"; second, on 13 March 1892, again a baptism, where his name is entered simply as "Sky"; third, in January 1894 when he registers a marriage to "Esther" and was baptized once more, this time as "John Sky". In Haida, 'Skaay' refers to a type of mollusk. The Haida were divided into two social groups, or moieties, called Raven and Eagle. Skaay belonged to the Eagle side or moiety.

== See also ==
- Oral history
