= Kumakatok =

Philippine mythical creature

Creature information
- Grouping: Door knockers, omen
- Similar entities: Moirai

Origin
- Region: Luzon and Visayas

The Kumakatok ("door knockers") are a group of three robed figures believed by many in the Philippines to knock on doors in the middle of the night and bring bad omens. They allegedly look like humans, but wear hoods that obscure their faces to some extent. One resembles a young female, a middle aged man and an elderly man. The omen will affect those that the group visited regardless whether they opened the door to invite the group or not.

A visit from the Kumakatok is usually an omen of death, as either the eldest member of the house, or one who is ill, will be visited and subsequently die. The visits are supposedly more frequent after a disease outbreak. Residents of Luzon and Visayas at one time painted white crosses on their doors to ward off the Kumakatok. This trend was said to cause the trio to switch from residences to government buildings, hospitals, and even churches.

Reported sightings of the Kumakatok have decreased significantly since World War II. One possible explanation is that the destruction of many buildings during that period resulted in fewer available doors for the Kumakatok to knock on.

== See also ==
- Knocker (folklore)
- Philippine mythology
- Psychopomp
