= Xargi =

Siberian mythological figure

Xargi, or Mangi, is the chief ruler of the underworld in Siberian mythology. Ancestor to the shamans and bear-brother of the creator god, he searches for the omi soul, which has taken a shadow form, or xanjan. Upon being found, it turns into a bird and is returned to Earth to enter another creature's body.
