= Chepi =

Ghost or fairy in Narragansett mythology

Chepi is a ghost or fairy in the mythology of the Narragansett tribe of Native Americans from the Narragansett Bay region of Rhode Island, Connecticut, and eastern Massachusetts. Chepi is a spirit of the dead who shared knowledge with medicine people in dreams or visions. Chepi could be called upon by the "pawwaw" or medicine person, to destroy an enemy as an avenging entity.
