= Vichama =

Incan mythology

In Inca mythology, Vichama is the god of death and the son of Inti. His mother was murdered by his half-brother Pacha Kamaq, and he took revenge by turning the humans who were created by Pachacamac into rocks and islands. Afterwards he hatched three eggs from which a new race of humans was born.

The name has been adopted by a theatre group from Villa El Salvador, Lima, Peru, which works worldwide, raising issues involving social responsibility and involvement.
