= Ta'xet =

Haida god of death

Ta'xet is the Haida god of violent death. He is considered to be one half of a duality; his counterpart is Tia, the goddess of peaceful death.

== Folklore ==
According to Haidan folklore, the raven stole the Moon from Ta'xet during Earth's creation and placed it in the sky to nourish humanity. If humanity was to ever displease the raven by altering the Earth's environment, he will return the Moon to Ta'xet and stop protecting humanity from Ta'xet's wrath. In folklore, it is also said that the souls of those who meet a violent death go to Ta'xet's house without a warning, while Tia leaves signs before she takes her victims.
