= Maya death gods =

The Maya death gods (also Ah Puch, Ah Cimih, Ah Cizin, Hun Ahau, Kimi, or Yum Kimil) known by a variety of names, are two basic types of death gods who are respectively represented by the 16th-century Yucatec deities Hunhau and Uacmitun Ahau mentioned by Spanish Bishop Diego de Landa. Hunhau is the lord of the Underworld. Iconographically, Hunhau and Uacmitun Ahau correspond to the Gods A and A' ("A prime"). In recent narratives, particularly in the oral tradition of the Lacandon people, there is only one death god (called "Kisin" in Lacandon), who acts as the antipode of the Upper God in the creation of the world and of the human body and soul. This death god inhabits an Underworld that is also the world of the dead. As a ruler over the world of the dead (Metnal or Xibalba), the principal death god corresponds to the Aztec deity Mictlāntēcutli. The Popol Vuh has two leading death gods, but these two are really one: Both are called "Death," but while one is known as "One Death," the other is called "Seven Death." They were vanquished by the Hero Twins.

The two principal death gods count among the many were-animals and spooks (wayob) inhabiting the Underworld, with the God A way in particular manifesting himself as a head hunter and a deer hunter. Ah Puch was banished after he broke his promise with the Maya king and was sent to the storm that would bring him to earth forever.

== Post-Classic names ==
Kisin is the name of the death god among the Lacandons as well as the early colonial Choles, kis being a root with meanings like "flatulence" and "stench." Landa uses another name and calls the lord of the Underworld and "prince of the devils" Hunhau, a name that, recurring in early Yucatec dictionaries as Humhau and Cumhau, is not to be confused with Hun-Ahau; hau, or haw, means 'to end' and 'to lay on its back (mouth up)'. Other names include Yum Kimil, "Lord of Death" in Yucatán and (Ah) Pukuh in Chiapas. The name Hun Ahau ("One Lord") appears frequently in the Ritual of the Bacabs, but is never specified as a death god. Ah Puch, though often mentioned in books about the Mayas, does not appear to be an authentic Maya name for the death god. (An Ah Puch is mentioned in the opening of the Book of Chilam Balam of Chumayel in passing as a ruler of the North, and one of the Xibalba attendants in the Popol Vuh is called Ahal Puh.)

== Mythology ==
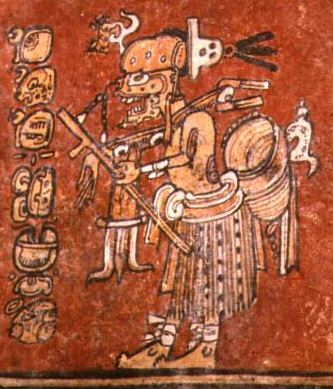
God A way as a hunter, Classic period

=== Kʼicheʼ ===
In the Popol Vuh, the Hero Twins descend to the "Place of Fright" (Xibalba), where a pair of Death Gods, Hun-Came ("One-Death") and Vucub-Came ("Seven-Death"), rule over a series of disease-bringing deities. They defeat the Death Gods and put restrictions on their cult.

=== Yucatec ===
According to one of the earliest sources on Maya religion (Francisco Hernández 1545), Eopuco (i.e., Ah Pukuh) mistreated and killed the Bacab, who was resurrected three days later.

=== Lacandon ===
The skeletal death god Kisin plays a prominent role in Lacandon mythology, chiefly in the following tales:

- (i) The creation of the underworld by the upper god, involving the upper god's death at the hands of Kisin, his resurrection, and Kisin's confinement to the underworld; in his anger, Kisin sometimes kicks the pillars of the earth, thus causing earthquakes;
- (ii) A failed attempt at the creation of human beings in emulation of the upper god, leading to the creation of the "totemic" animals of certain kin groups (onen);
- (iii) The descent of the ancestor Nuxiʼ into the underworld to woo Kisin's daughter;
- (iv) The description of the destiny of the souls in the underworld, where Kisin (a) burns the souls of evildoers, (b) transforms the souls of certain evildoers into his "domestic animals," (c) hunts for the spider monkey doubles of men destined to die.

== Classic Period: God A ==
During the Classic period, his abdomen is sometimes replaced with out-pouring swirls of blood or rotting matter. He is usually accompanied by spiders, centipedes, scorpions, a vulture, an owl, and a bat. He is pictured with jewelry usually on his wrists and ankles. On his lower extremity, he has around "molo" sign that putrid smells of death. Over his head is a floating object shaped like an "S" probably an insect carrying a torch. On his forehead like other deities of the underworld he wears an "aqabal" also known as an emblem of "darkness." His head in Maya culture was used to represent the number 10, the lower jawbone meant the numeral ten that was inscribed within all other head variants of the numbers thirteen to nineteen. He was often pictured as dancing and holding a smoking cigarette. On his neck is a death collar which consists of embodied eyes hanging by their nerve cords. The black spots on his body represent the decay of the flesh. Since he is a rotting corpse in some images he is shown with a bloated stomach.

== Ritual ==
Both God A and God A' figure prominently in the New Year rites depicted in the Dresden Codex. God A' probably corresponds to the death god Uacmitun Ahau in Landa's description of the New year rites. He presides over a year of great mortality. To ward off evil during this year, men would walk over a bed of glowing embers that possibly represented the fires of the Underworld. Temple priests would get in costumes of God A' and performed rites of bloodletting and human sacrifice. Those who impersonated this deity would dance out the steps of ritual sacrifice, putting terror in the soul of ritual participants and the spectators who witnessed these sacred events.

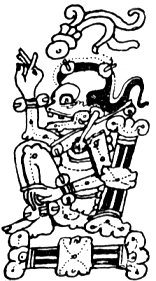
God A in the lunar eclipse tables of the Dresden Codex

=== Man Hunt and Deer hunt ===
With varying hieroglyphic names and attributes, God A figures in processions and random arrays of were-animals and spooks (wayob). In connection with these apparitions, he tends to be depicted either as a headhunter or as deer hunter (see figure). On the grandiose Tonina stucco wall, the severed head is that of an enemy king. The death god's deer hunt has two sides. On the one hand, this deer hunt may metaphorically refer to a hunt for human victims. On the other hand, there also seems to be a connection with certain wayob shaped like deer but with the tail of a spider monkey. On the famous peccary skull from Copan, for example, such a deer way appears to be welcoming the death god returning from a hunt.

=== Jaguar baby transformation ===
Together with the Rain Deity Chaac, God A is present at the jaguar transformation of a man (possibly a hero) who is usually shown as a baby, and who seems to disappear into the underworld.--

Apart from these contexts, on a Copan bench, the earth-carrying Bacabs are paired off with death gods A. This may relate to the fact that in Yucatán, one of the four Bacabs was called "White Death" (Zaccimi).

== Classic Period: God A' ==
The other codical death god is God A' ("A prime"), corresponding to Landa's Uac Mitun Ahau, and characterized by a black stripe over the eyes and a "darkness" infix in the forehead. Just like death god A, he figures among the Classic wayob. Instead of being a head hunter, however, God A' is a demonic apparition repeatedly shown in the illusionistic act of self-decapitation. He is presented with very pale flesh similar to a corpse. Over his eyes are black bands. Like all deities in the underworld, he wears the "aq'ab'al" which is the sign of underworld darkness and divination. The god is shown wearing a large headdress with a femur bone going through the center of it. In most images, he is shown holding either a stave, pipe, or orb. Like most deities in the Maya religion, he wears jewelry around the neck, wrist, and ankles. He wears a gown or cloth that covers his pelvis area in the front and his backside. His iconography shows considerable overlap with that of an anthropomorphic way (labeled Mokochih) and of a demonic flying insect sometimes carrying a torch (possibly a blowfly, firefly, or wasp). In spite of the above, it has been suggested that the hieroglyphic name of God A' should be read as Akan, a name otherwise only known as that of a 16th-century deity of alcoholic beverages.

== Calendrical and astrological functions ==
A text from the early colonial songbook of Dzitbalche states the Underworld (Miitnal) to be opened and Kisin (Cizin) to be liberated during the concluding twenty days of the year (Uayah-yaab). In the Classic period, the head of the skeletal God A serves as (i) the hieroglyph for the day Kimi, "Death," corresponding to Kame' in Quiché, also the name of the paired rulers of Xibalba in the Popol Vuh; (ii) the hieroglyph for the number ten (lajun), perhaps because the verbal stem laj- means "to end;" (iii) a variable element in glyph C of the Lunar Series, registering one to six completed lunations, probably for the prediction of lunar eclipses. Apparently connected to this, God A can be depicted with the attribute of a crescent that seems to mark him as a lunar patron deity. A vignette of God A (or perhaps his female counterpart) illustrates the lunar eclipse tables of the Dresden Codex (see figure).

== See also ==
- Mictlantecuhtli

== Bibliography ==
- Alfredo Barrera Vázquez, El libro de los cantares de Dzitbalche. INAH, Mexico 1965.
- Didier Boremanse, Contes et mythologie des Indiens Lacandons. L'Harmattan, Paris 1986. (Cuentos y mitología de los lacandones. Tradición oral maya. Editorial: Academia de Geografia e Historia de Guatemala.)
- Michael D. Coe, 'Death and the Ancient Maya', in E.P. Benson ed., Death and the Afterlife in Pre-Columbian America. Dumbarton Oaks, Washington 1975.
- Nikolai Grube and Werner Nahm, A Census of Xibalba. The Maya Vase Book Vol. 4, New York 1994: Justin Kerr.
- Nikolai Grube, 'Akan – the God of Drinking, Disease, and Death', in Graña Behrens et al., Continuity and Change: Maya Religious Practices in Temporal Perspective (Acta Mesoamericana Vol. 14, 2004).
- Stone, Andrea, and Marc Zender, Reading Maya Art: A Hieroglyphic Guide to Ancient Maya Painting and Sculpture. Thames and Hudson 2011.
- Karl Taube, The Major Gods of Ancient Yucatán. Dumbarton Oaks, Washington 1992.
- Tedlock, Dennis (trans.) (1996). Popol Vuh: the Definitive Edition of the Mayan Book of the Dawn of Life and the Glories of Gods and Kings. Revised Edition. New York: Simon and Schuster. ISBN 0-671-45241-X.
- J. Eric S. Thompson, Maya History and Religion. Civilization of the American Indian Series, No. 99. Norman: University of Oklahoma Press. ISBN 0-8061-0884-3. OCLC 177832. 1970
- Alfred M. Tozzer, Landa's Relación de las cosas de Yucatán. A Translation. Peabody Museum, Cambridge MA 1941.
