= Xibalba =

Underworld in Kʼicheʼ Maya mythology

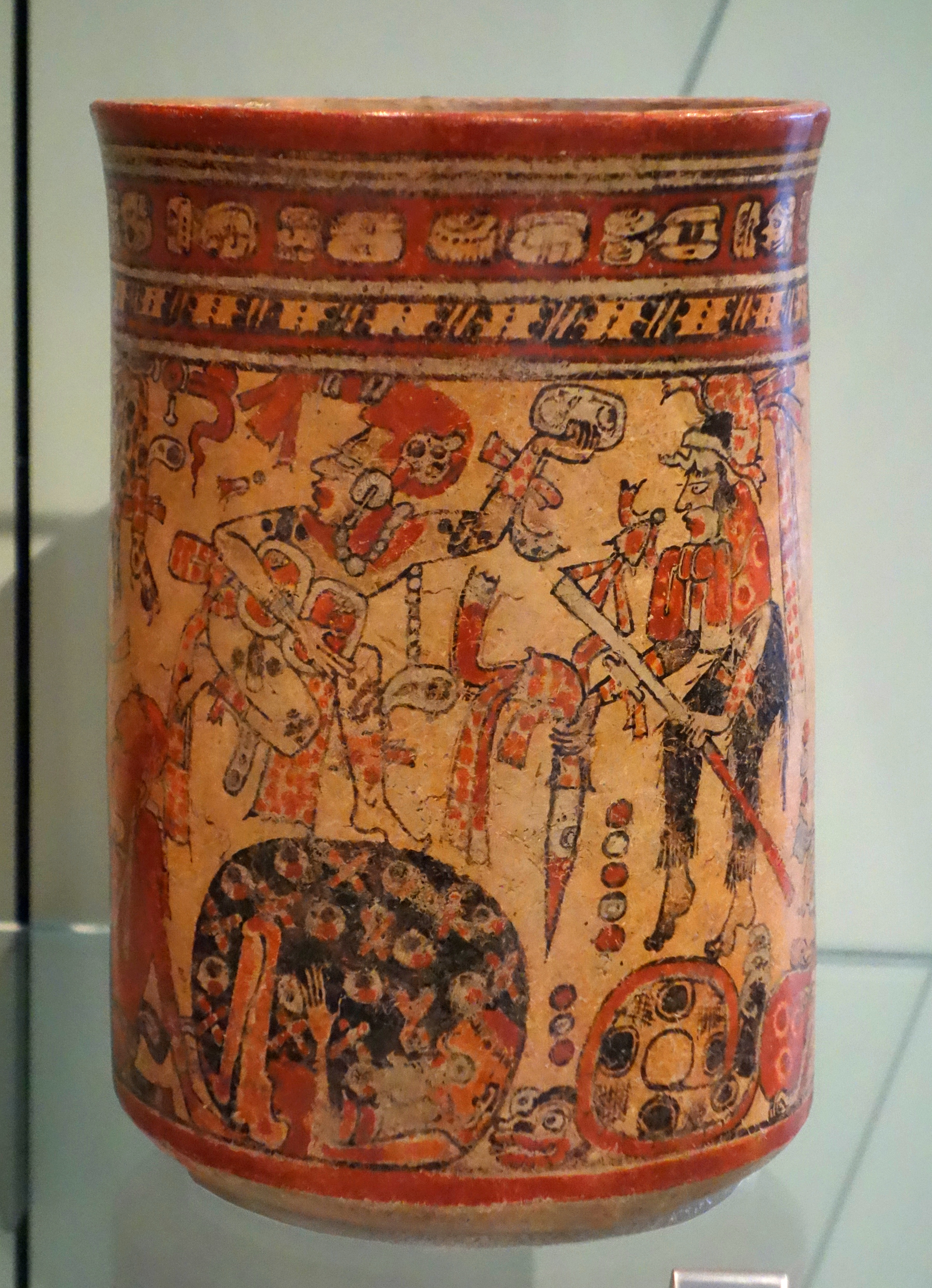
Vessel depicting the action of aggressive wayob and sacrificers

Xibalba (Mayan pronunciation: [ʃiɓalˈɓa]), roughly translated as "place of fright", is the Kʼicheʼ name of the Underworld (known as Mitnal in Yucatec) in Maya mythology, ruled by the Maya death gods and their helpers. In 16th-century Verapaz, the entrance to Xibalba was traditionally held to be a cave in the vicinity of Cobán, Guatemala. Cave systems in nearby Belize have also been referred to as the entrance to Xibalba. In some Maya areas, the Milky Way is viewed as the road to Xibalba.

== Inhabitants ==
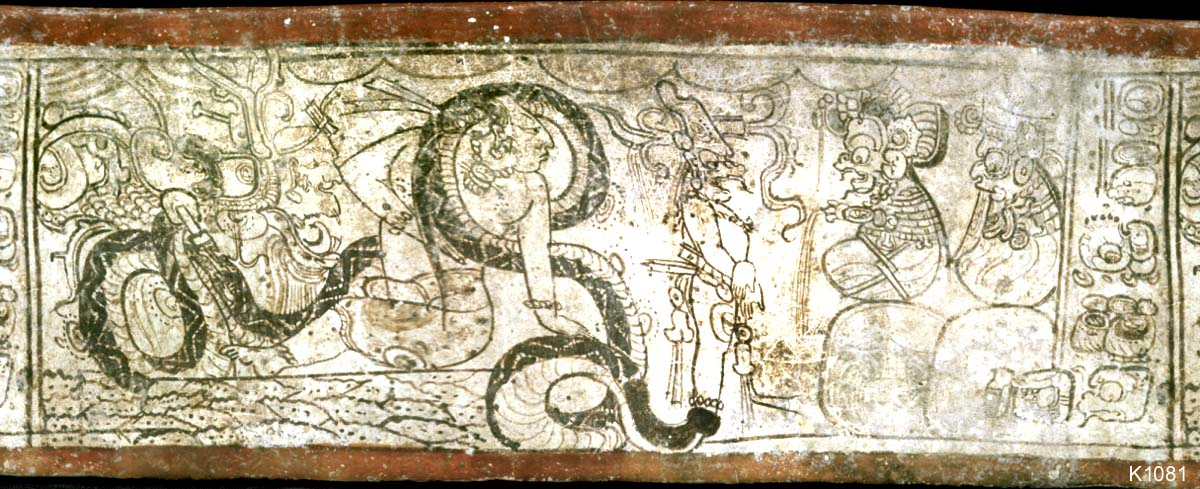
Noblewoman entangled by K'awiil's serpent leg

Xibalba is described in the Popol Vuh as a court below the surface of the Earth associated with death and with twelve gods or powerful rulers known as the Lords of Xibalba. The first among the Maya death gods ruling Xibalba were Hun-Came ("One Death") and Vucub-Came ("Seven Death"), though Hun-Came is the senior of the two.

The remaining ten Lords are often referred to as demons and are given commission and domain over various forms of human suffering: to cause sickness, starvation, fear, destitution, pain, and ultimately death. These Lords all work in pairs: Xiquiripat ("Flying Scab") and Cuchumaquic ("Gathered Blood"), who sicken people's blood; Ahalpuh ("Pus Demon") and Ahalgana ("Jaundice Demon"), who cause people's bodies to swell up; Chamiabac ("Bone Staff") and Chamiaholom ("Skull Staff"), who turn dead bodies into skeletons; Ahalmez ("Sweepings Demon") and Ahaltocob ("Stabbing Demon"), who hide in the unswept areas of people's houses and stab them to death; and Xic ("Wing") and Patan ("Packstrap"), who cause people to die coughing up blood while out walking on a road. The remaining residents of Xibalba are thought to have fallen under the dominion of one of these Lords, going about the face of the Earth to carry out their listed duties.

== Structure ==
Xibalba was a large palace and a number of individual structures or locations within Xibalba are described or mentioned in the Popol Vuh. Chief among these was the council place of the Lords, the five or six houses that served as the first tests of Xibalba, and the Xibalban ballcourt. Also mentioned are the homes of the Lords, gardens, and other structures indicating that Xibalba was at least a great city.

Xibalba seems to be rife with tests, trials, and traps for anyone who came into the city. Even the roads to Xibalba were filled with obstacles: first a river filled with scorpions, a river filled with blood, and then a river filled with pus. Beyond these was a crossroads where travellers had to choose from among four roads that spoke in an attempt to confuse and beguile. Upon passing these obstacles, one would come upon the Xibalba council place, where it was expected visitors would greet the seated Lords. Realistic mannequins were seated near the Lords to confuse and humiliate people who greeted them, and the confused would then be invited to sit upon a bench, which was actually a hot cooking surface. The Lords of Xibalba would entertain themselves by humiliating people in this fashion before sending them into one of Xibalba's deadly tests.

The city was home to at least six deadly houses filled with trials for visitors. The first was Dark House, a house that was completely dark inside. The second was Rattling House or Cold House, full of bone-chilling cold and rattling hail. The third was Jaguar House, filled with hungry jaguars. The fourth was Bat House, filled with dangerous shrieking bats, and the fifth was Razor House, filled with blades and razors that moved about of their own accord. In another part of the Popol Vuh, a sixth test, Hot House, filled with fires and heat, is identified. The purpose of these tests was to either kill or humiliate people placed into them if they could not outwit the test.

== Downfall of Xibalba ==
Xibalba was home of a famous ballcourt in which the heroes of the Popol Vuh succumbed to the trickery of the demons in the form of a deadly, bladed ball, as well as the site in which the Maya Hero Twins outwitted the gods and brought about their downfall.

According to the Popol Vuh, the denizens of Xibalba at one point enjoyed the worship of the people on the surface of the Earth who offered human sacrifice to the gods of death. Over the span of time covered in the Popol Vuh, the gods of Xibalba are tricked and finally humiliated into accepting lesser offerings from above by the Maya Twins, who got superpowers after they were burnt and their ashes thrown into a magical river. Anthropologist Dennis Tedlock has speculated that this version of history may be a Kʼicheʼ slander on earlier Mayan forms of worship.

The role of Xibalba and its inhabitants after their great defeat at the hands of the Hero Twins is unclear, although it seems to have continued its existence as a dark place of the underworld long after.

== See also ==
- Diyu
- Mictlān
- Patala
