= Asamando =

Underworld in Akan mythology

Asamando, roughly translated as "place of the dead", or "cemetery" is the name of the underworld in Akan mythology, ruled by the Anadwora, part of the religious traditions of the Akan people of Ghana. In some Akan folk traditions, the Milky Way is seen as the road to Asamando, although in others, the Milky Way is seen as a road to the heavenly kingdom of Nyame. In other folk traditions, Asamando is believed to be across from a raging lake, one with a current so strong that it cannot be crossed.

== Inhabitants ==
Asamando is the land of the dead, where the Nananom Nsamanfo (the ancestors) and the dead (Nsamanfo) dwell after their death.

When Owuo has no particular place to go to kill, he will return to Asamando.

Amokye is the guardian of the threshold of Asamando. She is usually represented as an old woman. It is believed she can be compassionate and kind or difficult and cruel. She carries a brass pan at her side that contains beads and amoasies for women. She is able to allow the living to enter Asamando.

Asamando is the home of various spiritual beings who are prohibited from leaving by the abosom, because if they entered the corporeal world, they would make apparitions that could petrify or kill mortals.

== Entering ==
If Owuo reaches an individual before Tano (Ta Kora) does, the individual will die, and they will be sent on a forty-day journey to Asamando. When they reach it, they are told to sit on a stool and are offered water. They are then told to give an account of their life. If they lived a good life, they are permitted to reincarnate, if they lived a bad one, they are not, and when they live a perfect life, they become an Nsamanfo. It is believed that a pregnancy lasts nine months because that is how long it takes for a soul to return to the corporeal world. Some souls decide to stay in the corporeal world because of the way they died. If someone doesn't wish to reincarnate, they still live in Asamando as an osaman, but their sunsum returns to their father's house for possible reincarnation. Deified ancestors to live with the abosom, if they lived a good enough life or received knowledge and wisdom comparable to the abosom. Reincarnation is known as bebra.

The deified ancestors are regarded to have done what the abosom have not – conquering death as a human. For this reason, Nsamanfo are wholly divine and wholly human. Their combined human and divine natures are what makes them unique, as they understand the human condition better than the abosom.
