= Wayob =

Mayan shapeshifter in folk religion

Wayob is the plural form of way (or uay), a Maya word with a basic meaning of 'sleep(ing)', but which in Yucatec Maya is a term specifically denoting the Mesoamerican nagual, that is, a person who can transform into an animal while asleep in order to do harm, or else the resulting animal transformation itself. Already in Classic Maya belief, way animals, identifiable by a special hieroglyph, had an important role to play.

== In Maya ethnography ==
In Yucatec ethnography, the animal transformation involved is usually a common domestic or domesticated animal, but may also be a ghost or apparition, for example 'a creature with wings of straw mats'. Moreover, in the 16th century, wild animals such as jaguar and grey fox are mentioned as animal shapes of the sorcerer, together with the ah uaay xibalba or 'underworld transformer'. Some sort of 'devil's pact' seems to be implied. The Yucatec way has its counterparts among other Maya groups. In Tzotzil ethnography, the way (here called wayihel or chanul) is more often an animal companion and refers not only to domestic animals, but also to igneous powers such as meteor and lightning. In Tzeltal Cancuc, the nagual animal companion is considered a 'caster of disease'. Other names found are: lab, labil, wayixelal or vayijelal, way and wayxel or wayjel.

== In the Classic Period ==
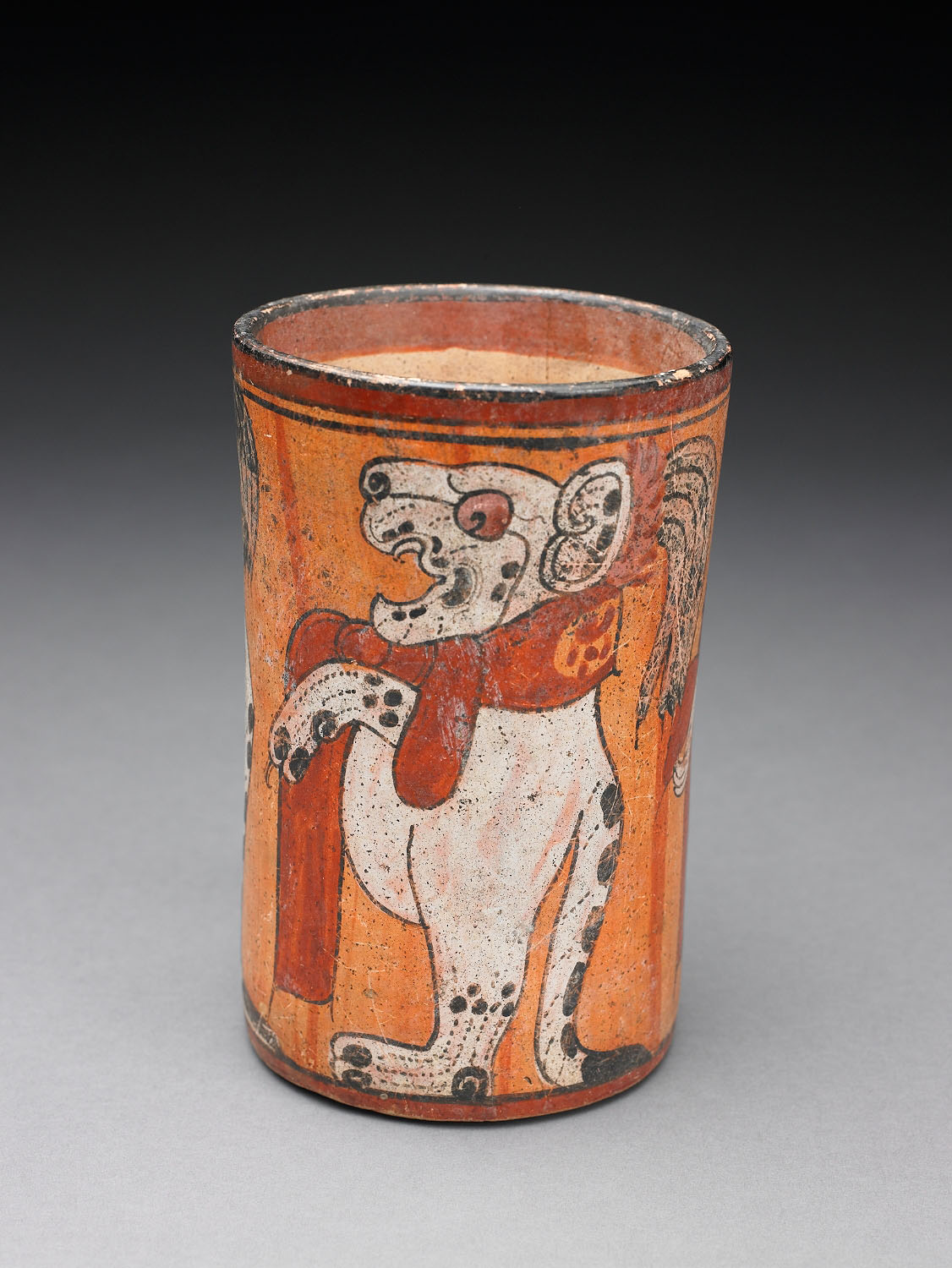
Jaguar way with scarf

A Classic Maya hieroglyph is read as way (wa-ya) by Houston and Stuart. These authors assert that a glyph representing a stylised, frontal 'Ahau' (Ajaw) face half covered by a jaguar-pelt represents the way, with syllabic wa and ya elements attached to the main sign clarifying its meaning. Many way animals are distinguished by (i) a shoulder cape or scarf tied in front; (ii) a splashing of jaguar spots or other jaguar characteristics; (iii) the attribute of an upturned 'jar of darkness'; and (iv) fire elements.

The Classic wayob include a far wider array of shapes than the 20th-century ones from Yucatán (insofar as the latter have been reported), with specific names assigned to each of them. They include not only many mammals (especially jaguars) and birds, but also apparitions and spooks: hybrids of deer and spider monkey, walking skeletons, a self-decapitating man, a young man within a fire, etc. The animal wayob are likely to be transformative shapes of human beings, the walking skeletons (Maya Death Gods) more particularly of the ah uaay xibalba transformers.

At times, the name of the way is followed by an 'emblem glyph' giving the name of a specific Maya kingdom (or perhaps its ruling family). The skeletal way prominent on a Tonina stucco wall carries the severed head of a defeated opponent.

== See also ==
- Familiar spirit
- Huay Chivo
- Power animal
- Tonal (mythology)
- Tutelary spirit
