= Underworld =

World of the dead in various mythologies

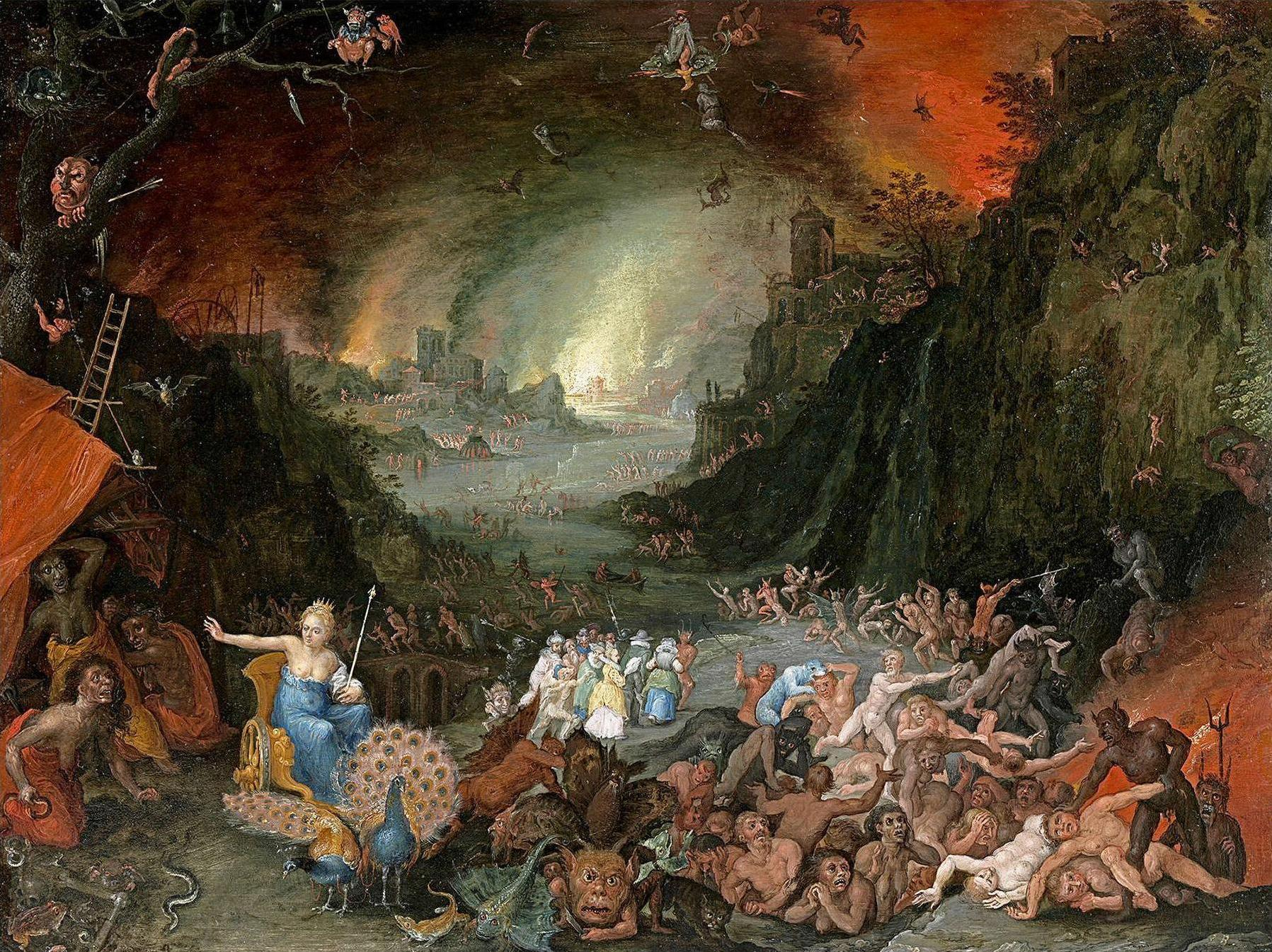
Juno in the Underworld by Jan Brueghel the Younger, between 1626 and 1630

The underworld, also known as the netherworld or hell, is the supernatural world of the dead in various religious traditions and myths, located below the world of the living. Chthonic is the technical adjective for things of the underworld.

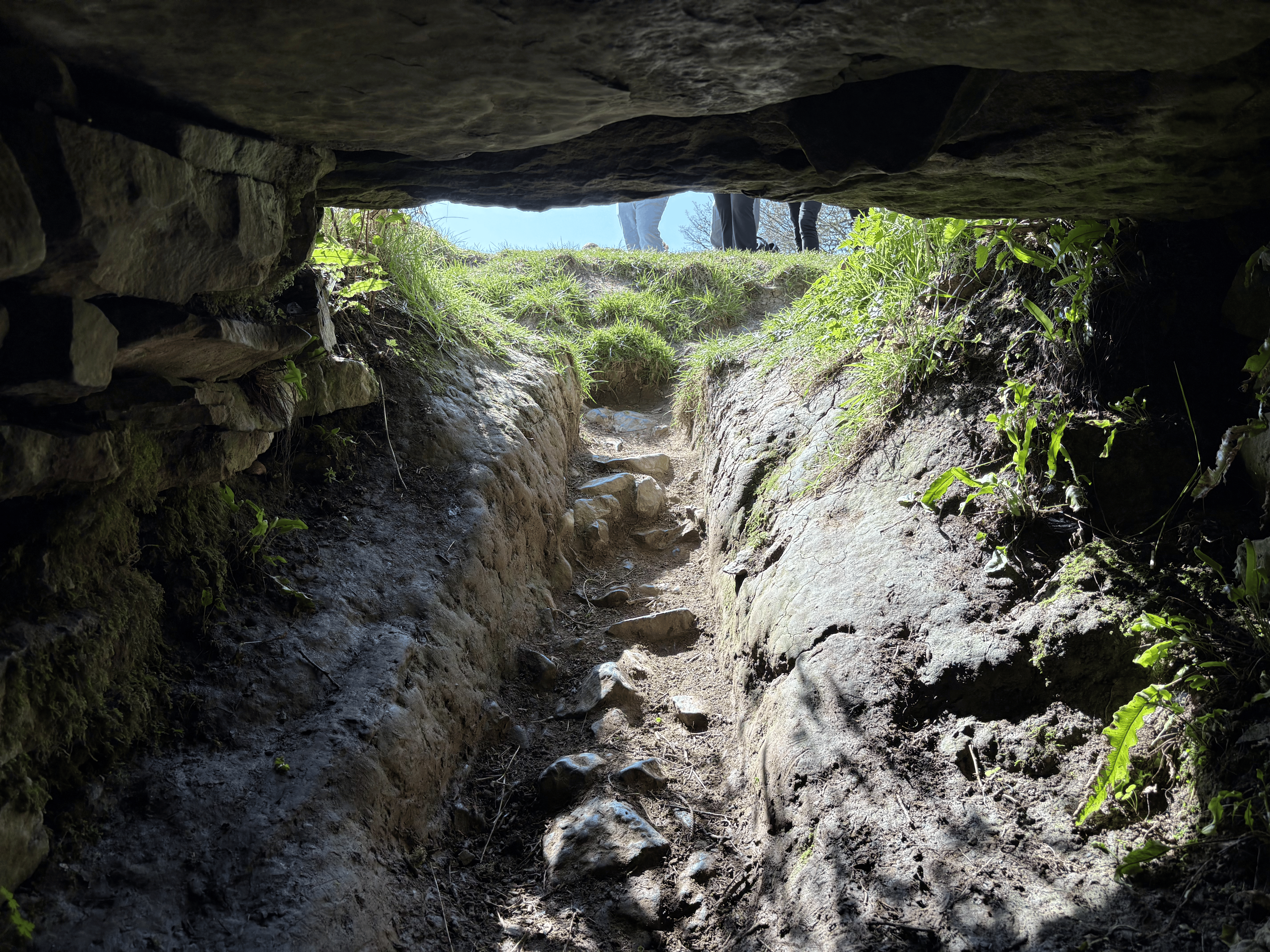
Oweynagat in Rathcroghan, the entrance to the underworld in Irish mythology

The concept of an underworld is found in almost every civilization and "may be as old as humanity itself". Common features of underworld myths are accounts of living people making journeys to the underworld, often for some heroic purpose. Other myths reinforce traditions that the entrance of souls to the underworld requires a proper observation of ceremony, such as the ancient Greek story of the recently dead Patroclus haunting Achilles until his body could be properly buried for this purpose. People with high social status were dressed and equipped in order to better navigate the underworld.

A number of mythologies incorporate the concept of the soul of the deceased making its own journey to the underworld, with the dead needing to be taken across a defining obstacle such as a lake or a river to reach this destination. Imagery of such journeys can be found in both ancient and modern art. The descent to the underworld has been described as "the single most important myth for Modernist authors".

== By religion ==
This list includes underworlds in various religious traditions, with links to corresponding articles:

Ethnicity, religion, or region	Name of underworld
Albanian mythology	Ferri
Aztec mythology	Mictlan
Mesopotamian religion	Irkalla
Baduy & Sundanese mythology	Buana Larang
Buddhism	Naraka (also Niraya)
Celtic mythology	Celtic Otherworld
Chinese folk religion / Taoism	Míngjiè 冥界, Huángquán 黄泉, Diyu 地狱
Christian mythology - for sinners	Hell, Tartarus, Purgatory, Hades
Egyptian religion	Aaru, Duat, Neter-khertet, Amenti
Estonian mythology	Toonela
Fijian mythology	Burotu, Murimuria
Finnish mythology	Tuonela
Georgian mythology	Kveskneli
Germanic religion	Hel, Náströnd, Niflhel
Greek religion	Main article: Greek underworld Elysium, Asphodel Meadows, Tartarus
Guanche mythology	Echeide, Guayota
Hinduism	Patala, Naraka or Yamaloka
Hittite mythology	Dankuš daganzipaš/Dankuš tekan (dark earth)
Hopi mythology	Maski
Hungarian mythology	Alvilág
Inca mythology	Uku Pacha
Inuit mythology	Adlivun
Irish mythology	Emain Ablach, Mag Mell, Tír na nÓg
Islamic mythology - for sinners	Jahannam, Sijjin
Jainism	Naraka, Adho Loka (the lower world)
Shinto	Yomi 黄泉, Ne-no-Kuni 根の国, Jigoku 地獄
Jewish mythology	Sheol; for sinners:Abaddon, Tehom (in Kabbalah), Tophet, Tzoah Rotachat, Dudael
Korean mythology	Korean: 지옥; Hanja: 地獄; RR: Jiok
Latvian mythology	Aizsaule
Lithuanian mythology	Anapilis mountain
Malay mythology	Alam Ghaib (The unseen realm)
Indonesian mythology	Alam Ghaib (The unseen realm)
Mandaeism	World of Darkness (alma d-hšuka)
Māori mythology	Hawaiki, Rarohenga, Rangi Tuarea, Te Toi-o-nga-Ranga, Uranga-o-te-rā
Mapuche mythology	Pellumawida, Degin, Wenuleufu, Ngullchenmaiwe
Maya mythology	Xibalba or Metnal
Melanesian mythology	(includes Fijian) Bulu, Burotu, Murimuria, Nabagatai, Tuma
Oromo mythology	Ekera
Zoroastrianism	Duzakh
Philippine mythology	Kasanaan
Polynesian mythology	Avaiki, Bulotu, Iva, Lua-o-Milu, Nga- Atua, Pulotu, Rangi Tuarea, Te Toi-o-nga-Ranga, Uranga-o-Te-Ra
Pueblo mythology	Shipap
Roman mythology	Orcus, Inferi Di, Avernus
Romanian mythology	Tărâmul Celălalt
Slavic mythology	Nav, Vyraj
Sumerian mythology	Kur, Hubur
Turko-Mongol	Tamağ
Vietnamese mythology	Âm phủ 陰府, Địa ngục 地獄
Wagawaga (New Guinea) mythology	Hiyoyoa
Welsh mythology	Annwn, Avalon, Caer Sidi

== Underworld figures ==
This list includes rulers or guardians of the underworld in various religious traditions, with links to corresponding articles.

Origin	associated deity/spirits
Aboriginal mythology	Baiame (Kamilaroi), Eingana
Akkadian mythology	Allu, Anu, Anunnaku, Ereshkigal, Etemmu, Gallu, Humbaba, Mamitu, Nergal, Utnapishtim
Albanian mythology	E Bukura e Dheut
Turko-Mongol	Erlik
Armenian mythology	Spandaramet
Aztec mythology	Mictlantecuhtli & Mictecacihuatl (advocations: Chalmecacihualt, Chalmecatl)
Babylonian mythology	Erra, Nergal, Ninlil, Sursunabu, Ur-shanabi, Utnapishtim
Balinese mythology	Batara Kala, Setesuyara
Bon mythology	gNyan
Buddhism	King Yama
Canaanite mythology	Mot, Arsay
Celtic mythology	Taranis (sometimes in popular culture)
Chinese folk religion	Yanluo Wang, Heibai Wuchang, Ox-Head and Horse-Face, Meng Po, Zhong Kui
Christianity	Satan, Lucifer, Beelzebub, Belial
Egyptian mythology	Aken, Aker (strictly only the gatekeeper), Am-heh, Amunet, Ammit, Andjety, Anubis, Apep, Apis, Astennu, Ha, Imiut (if the Imiut was ever considered a god), Isis, Mehen, Naunet, Nehebkau, Nephthys, Nun, Nut, Osiris, Ptah, Seker, Thoth, Wepwawet
Elamite mythology	Jabru
Estonian mythology	Vanapagan
Etruscan mythology	Charun, Culsu, Februus, Mania, Mantus, Nethuns, Tuchulcha, Vanth
Fijian mythology	Degei
Finnish mythology	Kalma, Kipu-Tyttö, Kivutar, Lovitar, Surma, Tuonen akka, Tuonetar, Tuoni, Vammatar
Greek mythology	Cerberus, Charon, Hades, Pluto, Keres, Persephone, Thánatos, Eris, Hermes, Hera, Hecate
Georgian mythology	sasuleti
Germanic religion	Garmr, Hel, Rán, Níðhögg
Haida mythology	Ta'xet, Tia
Hattian mythology, Hittite mythology	Lelwani, Kumarbi
Hinduism	Yama
Hopi mythology	Maasaw
Hungarian mythology	Ördög
Ibo mythology	Ala
Incan mythology	Supay, Vichama
Indonesian mythology (ancient Javananese, Sundanese and Balinese)	Batara Kala guardian for sinners souls' underworld, Dewi Sri guardess for the righteous souls' underworld
Irish mythology	Aed, Donn, Manannán mac Lir, Nemain, The Morrigan
Islam	Iblis, Shayatin, Maalik (Guardian)
Inuit mythology	Pana, Sedna
Japanese mythology	Izanami-no-Mikoto, Jikininki, Shikome, Shiryō, Susanoo-no-Mikoto
Judaism	Satan, Malach HaMavet ("Angel of Death") (both are associated with Samael), Malachei Habala ("Sabotage Angels"), Dumah
Kassite mythology	Dur
Khmer mythology	Preas Eyssaur
Latvian mythology	Veļi, Veļu māte, Zemes māte
Lithuanian mythology	Velnias, Velinas
Levantine mythology	Mot, Arsay
Lunda mythology	Kalunga
Mandaean mythology	Ruha, Ur, Krun, Gaf, Qin, Zahreil, Lilith, Niuli, Saṭani, Latabi, Nalai, Gadulta, Anathan, Giu, Shdum, Zartai-Zartanai, Hag, Mag
Māori mythology	Hina, Hine-nui-te-pō, Kewa, Mahiuki, Rohe, Whiro
Maya mythology	Ah Puch (Lords: Hun-Came & Vucub-Came)
Melanesian mythology	(includes Fijian mythology) Degei, Ratumaibulu, Samulayo
Narragansett mythology	Chepi
Navaho mythology	Estsanatlehi
Niquiran mythology	Mictanteot
Ob-Ugrian mythology	Heini-iki
Orokolo mythology	Kiavari
Persian mythology	Angra Mainyu, Azhi Dahaka, Div (mythology)
Philippine mythology	Magwayen, Sidapa
Phoenician mythology	Horon
Phrygian mythology	Men
Polynesian mythology	Hikuleo, Hina, Hine-nui-te-Po, Kanaloa, Kiho-tumu, Makea Tutara, Mahuika, Mahu-ika, Marama, Mauri, Merau, Milu, Miru, Rimu, Rohe, Whiro
Prussian mythology	Picullus
Pueblo mythology	Iyatiku
Roma (Gypsy) mythology	Beng
Roman mythology	Cerberus, Dea Tacita, Dis Pater, Egestes, Fames, Inferi Di, Larenta, Letum, Libitina, Mors, Orcus, Pluto, Proserpina, Viduus
Romanian mythology	Diavolu, Satana, Necuratu, Scaraoschi
Russian mythology	Dyavol, Satanaya
Saami mythology	Yambe-akka
Salish mythology	Amotken
Siberian mythology	Chebeldei, Kul
Slavic mythology	Crnobog, Flins, Marzana, Nyia, Veles (god)
Sumerian mythology	Edimmu, Ekimmu, Endukugga, Enmesharra, Ereshkigal, Gidim, Nintinugga, Irkalla, Kur, Namtar, Nergal, Bitu, Nindukugga, Ninlil, Urshanabi, Ziusudra
Syrian mythology	Reshep
Tamil mythology	Cur
Thracian mythology	Heros
Turkic mythology	Erlik
Vietnamese mythology	Quảng Cung, Thập điện Diêm Vương, Hắc Bạch vô thường (couple of messengers lead the souls of the dead to the Âm phủ), Đầu Trâu Mặt Ngựa (has the same task as Hắc Bạch vô thường), Mạnh Bà (the maker of the oblivion soup called cháo lú by the Vietnamese)
Wagawaga mythology	Tumudurere
Welsh mythology	Arawn, Cwn Annwn, Gwyn ap Nudd, Hafgan, Pwyll
Yoruba mythology	Esu, Oya
Yurak mythology	Nga
Zuni mythology	Uhepono

== See also ==
- Afterlife
- Yomi
- Barzakh
- Hell, a similar infernal realm
- Hollow Earth
- Otherworld
- Pure land
- World Tree, a tree that connects the heavens, the earth and the underworld in a number of spiritual belief systems
