= Cibaciba and Drakulu =

Two cave entrances to the underworld in Fijian mythology

In Fijian mythology (specifically: Fiji), Cibaciba and Drakulu are the two cave entrances to the underworld (see Degei).
