= Tuonetar =

Mythical Finnish figure

Tuonetar (Finnish pronunciation: [ˈtuo̯netɑr]) is the Queen of the Underworld in Finnish mythology.

Tuonetar is the wife of Tuoni, with whom she rules over the Underworld Tuonela.

In the 16th song of the Kalevala, Väinämöinen arrives in their kingdom. Tuonetar is delighted to offer him a golden goblet of beer, but when he looks closer he can see it is really a black poison made of frog spawn, young poisonous snakes, lizards, adders, and worms. If a person drinks the brew, known as the beer of oblivion, they forget they ever existed and are unable to return to the land of the living, for only Tuonetar and Tuoni's children were allowed to leave Tuonela.

When Väinämöinen asks Tuonetar to reveal the three magic words he is seeking she refuses and vows that he will never leave Tuonela alive. She then puts him to sleep with her magic wand and has her three-fingered son weave a thousand nets of iron and copper to catch him if he tries to escape down the river of Tuoni. Väinämöinen succeeds in escaping by turning into a serpent and swimming through the nets, and when he returns to Kalevala he warns people to aim wisely lest they end up in Tuonela.

Tuonetar is recognized as the virgin of death and the goddess of the subterranean worlds. She is the mother of Kipu-Tyttö, Kivutar, Vammatar, Kalma, and Loviatar, as well as numerous plagues, diseases, demons, and monsters.
