= Heini-iki =

Mythological figure

In Ob-Ugrian mythology, Heini-iki, also referred to as Kul-iki, is the god of the Underworld and of the spirits of sickness. He is opposite in nature to his brother Numi-Torum, the heavenly god. He can appear in the shape of a dog or cat, or sometimes as a fog that hides a person from their guardian spirit.

The Khanty of the Surgut area described him as black in color. Animal sacrifices to him were also to be black in color. These sacrifices were to prevent illness among the people. His name was not to be spoken, especially in the presence of a sick or dying person.
