= Kirtimukha =

Creature in Hindu iconography

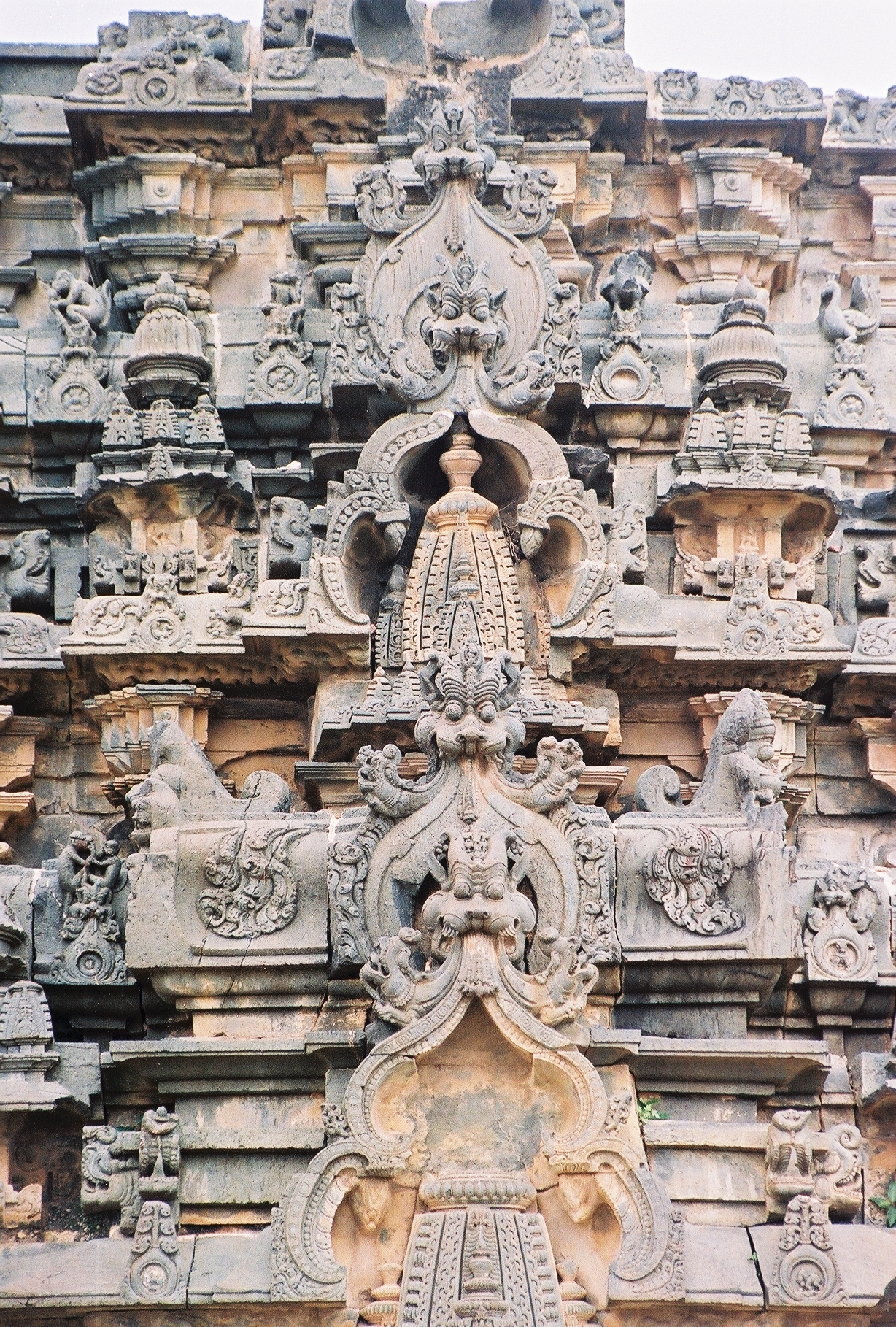
Kirtimukha at Kasivisvesvara Temple at Lakkundi, Gadag district, Karnataka, India

Kirtimukha (Sanskrit: कीर्तिमुख ,kīrtimukha, also kīrttimukha, a bahuvrihi compound translating to "glorious face") is the name of a swallowing fierce face with huge fangs, and gaping mouth, very common in the iconography of Hindu temple architecture in South Asia and Southeast Asia, and often also found in Buddhist architecture.

Unlike other Hindu legendary creatures, for example the sea-dwelling makara, the kirtimukha is essentially an ornamental motif in art, which has its origin in a legend from the Skanda Purana and the Shiva Purana.

== Origin and characteristics ==
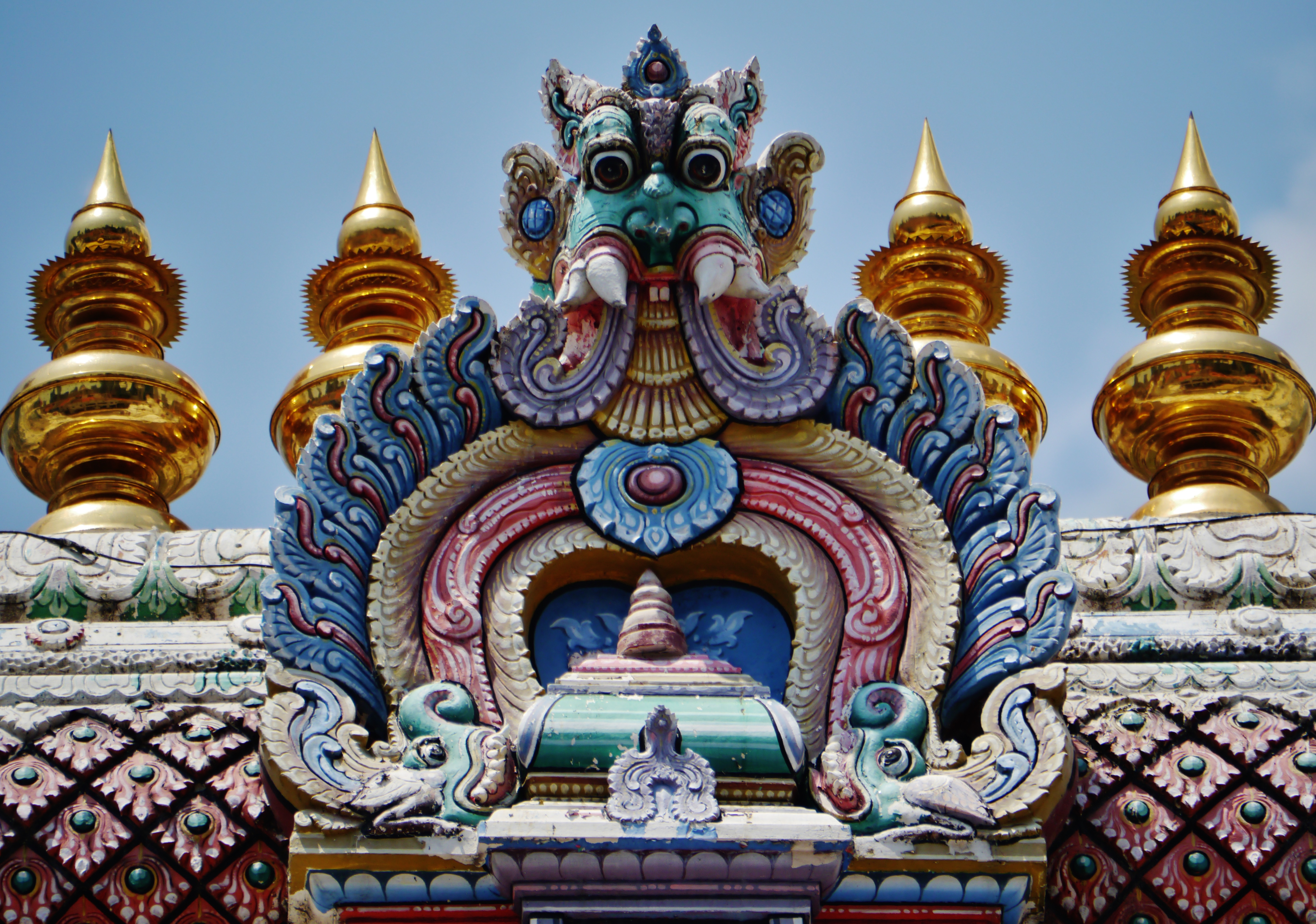
Mandir Kalasa and Kirtimukha ("glorious face").

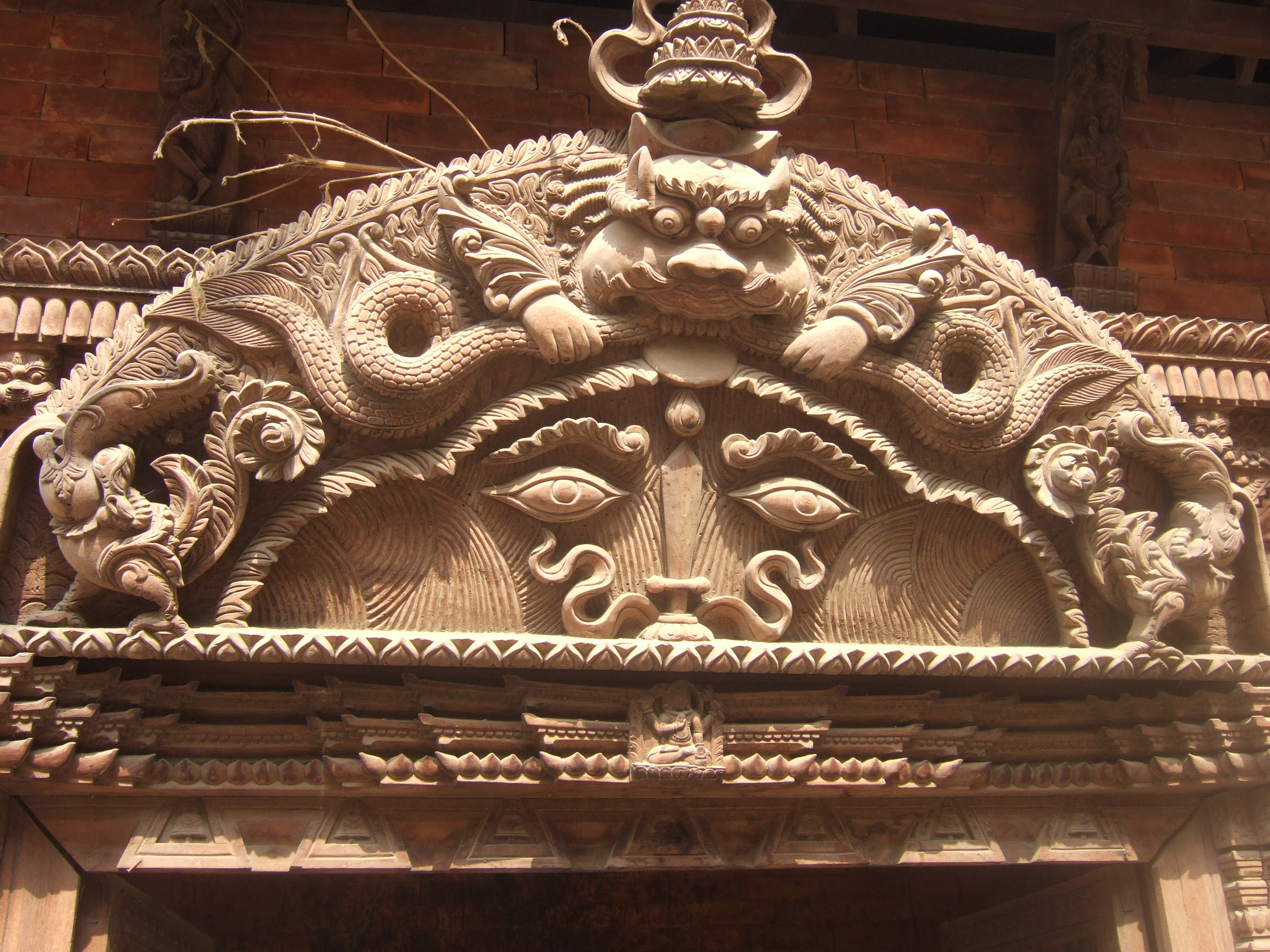
Kirtimukha above a Hindu temple entrance in Kathmandu, Nepal

The word mukha in Sanskrit refers to the face while kīrti means "fame, glory". The story of Kirtimukha begins when the asura king Jalandhara, who "by virtue of extraordinary austerities ... accumulated to himself irresistible powers." In a burst of pride, he sent forth his messenger, the Hindu deity Rahu, whose main task is eclipsing the moon, to challenge Shiva. "The challenge ... was that Shiva should give up his shining jewel of a bride Parvati." Shiva's immediate answer was to explode a tremendous burst of power from his third eye, which created a horrendous, emaciated, ravenous lion. A terrified Rahu sought Shiva's mercy, which Shiva agreed to. In order to feed the ravenous lion, Shiva suggested that the creature should feed on the selfishness, greed, and attachment of humans. Shiva, who was pleased with the result, gave it the name "glorious face", and declared that it should always be at the door of his temples. Thus, the Kirtimukha is a symbol of Shiva himself.

The Kirtimukha is often used as a motif surmounting the pinnacle of a temple or the image of a deity, especially in South Indian architecture. As Zimmer writes, "Kirtimukha serves primarily as an apotropaic demon-mask, a gruesome, awe-inspiring guardian of the threshold."

This face is sometimes confused with another sculptural element, the lion face (Simhamukha). However, in order to be a Kirtimukha it has to be engaged in swallowing, for the Kirtimukha is the figure of the "all consuming"

This fierce face with bulging eyes sits also as an embellishment over the lintel of the gate to the inner sanctum in many Hindu temples signifying the reabsorption that marks the entry into the temple. In Dravidian architecture and elsewhere it tops gavaksha (kudu, nasi) motifs. Mostly it is only a face, indeed very often only the upper jaw and top of the face is visible, although in some places its arms are portrayed as well. The motif can also sometimes be found in Shiva's matted hair.

Some authors have compared the Kirtimukha with the Greek myth of Ouroboros.

== Gallery ==
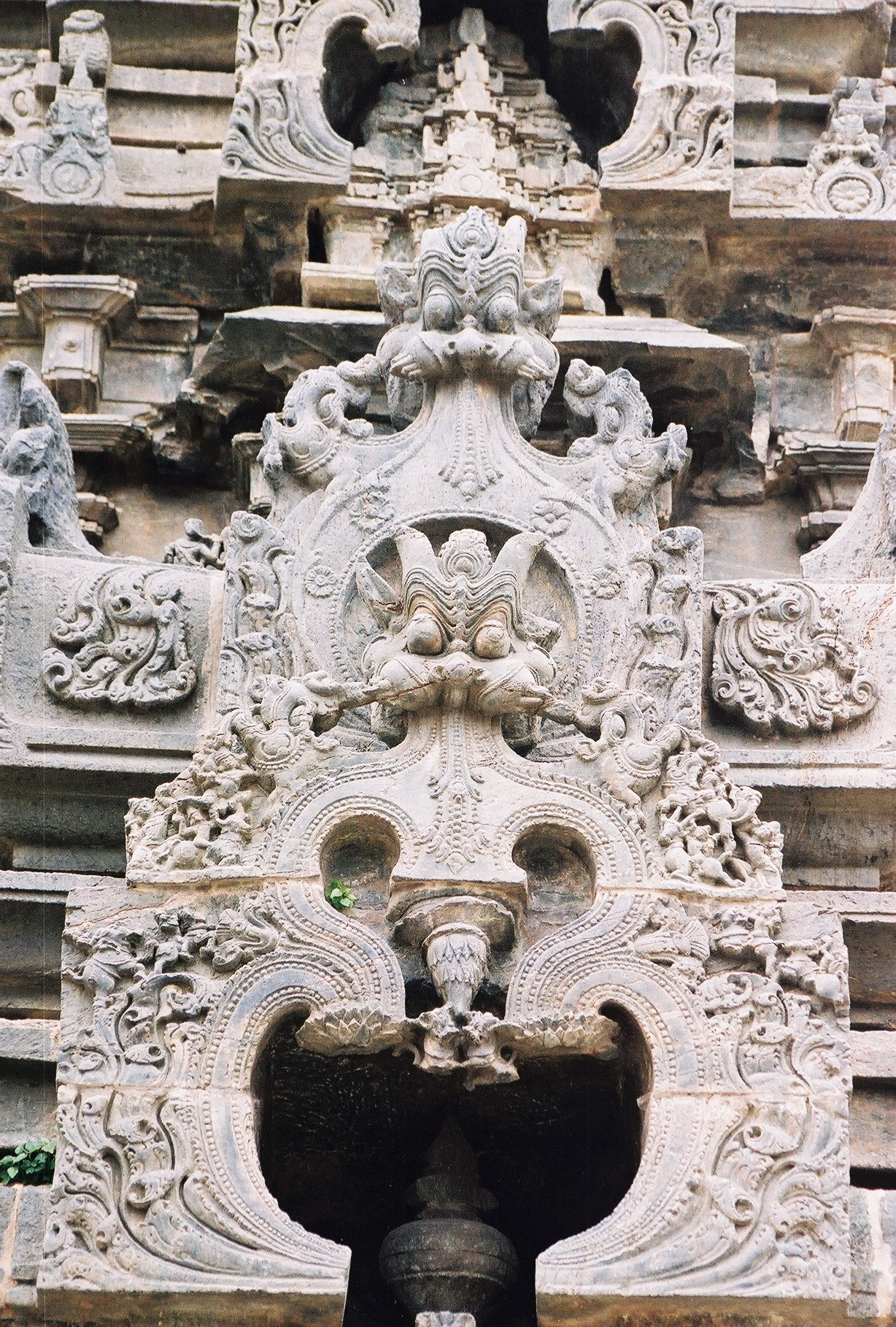
Kirtimukha at Amruteshvara temple in Annigeri, Dharwad district, Karnataka state, India

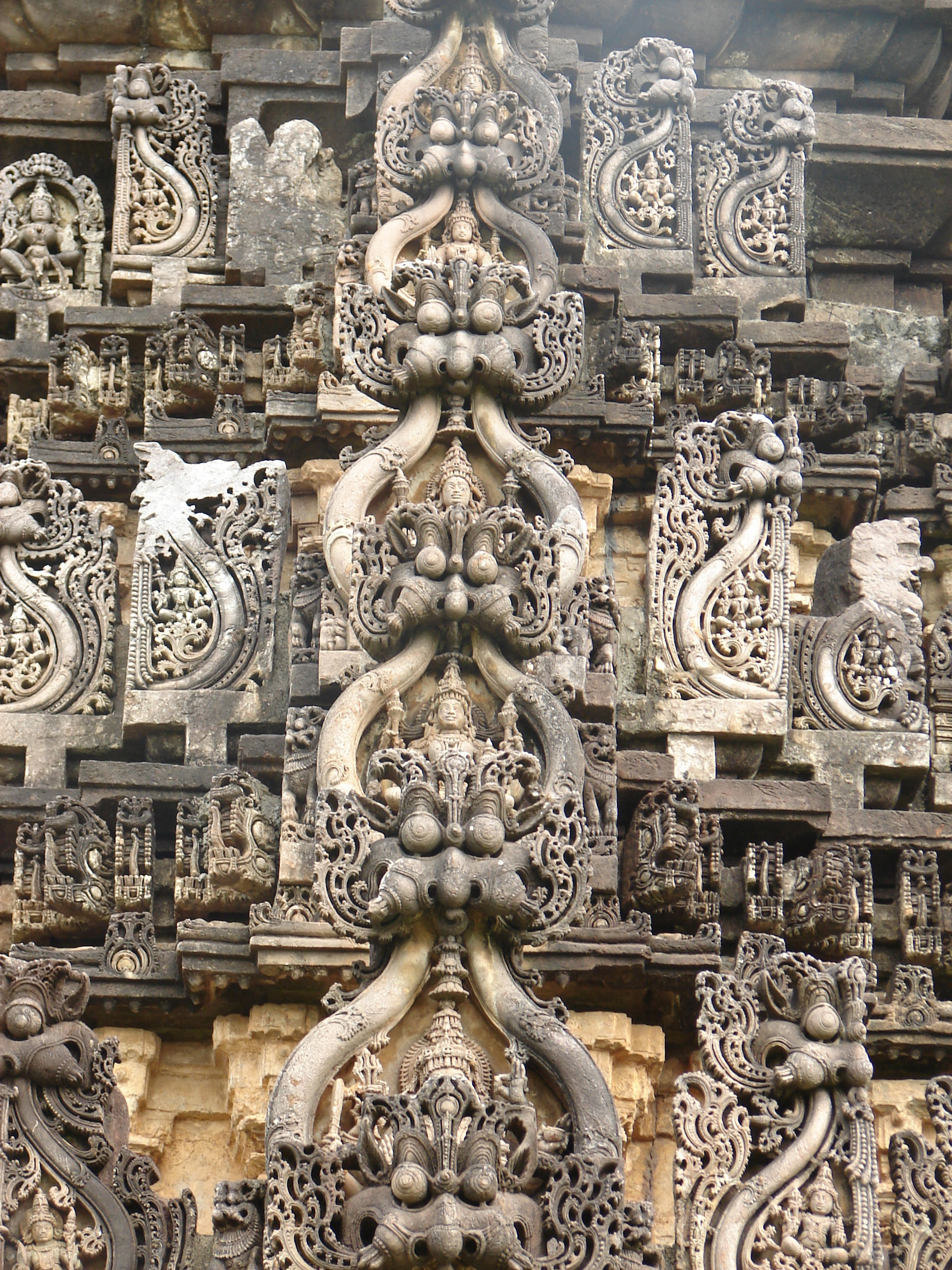
Kirtimukha at Amruteshwara temple in Amruthapura, Chikkamagaluru district, Karnataka state, India

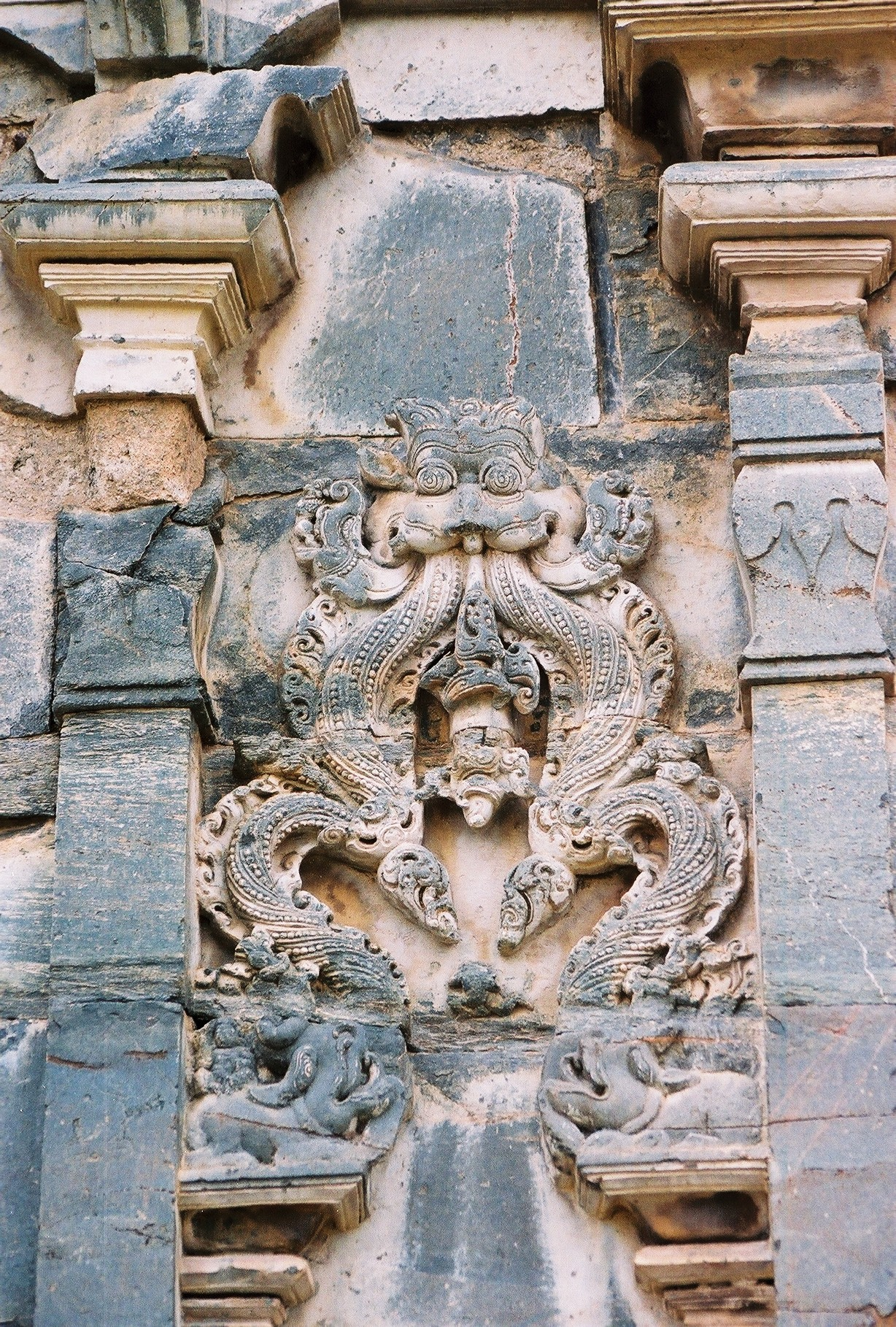
Kirtimukha at Kasi Visveshvara temple in Lakkundi, Gadag district, Karnataka state, India

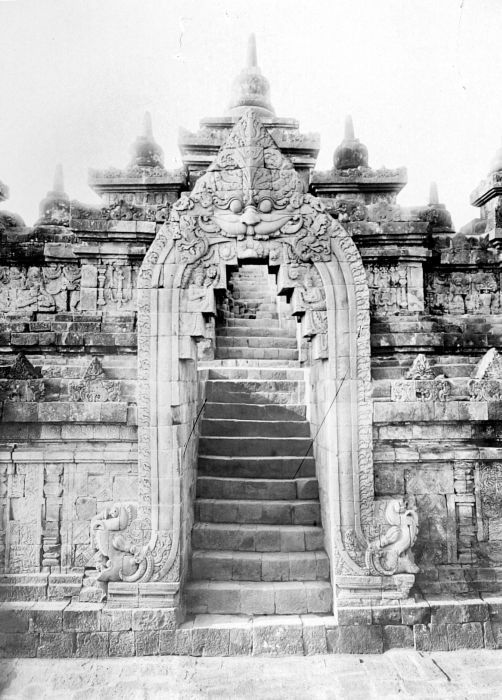
Kala-Makara, a Kirtimukha of 9th century Javanese Sailendra Borobudur portal, Indonesia

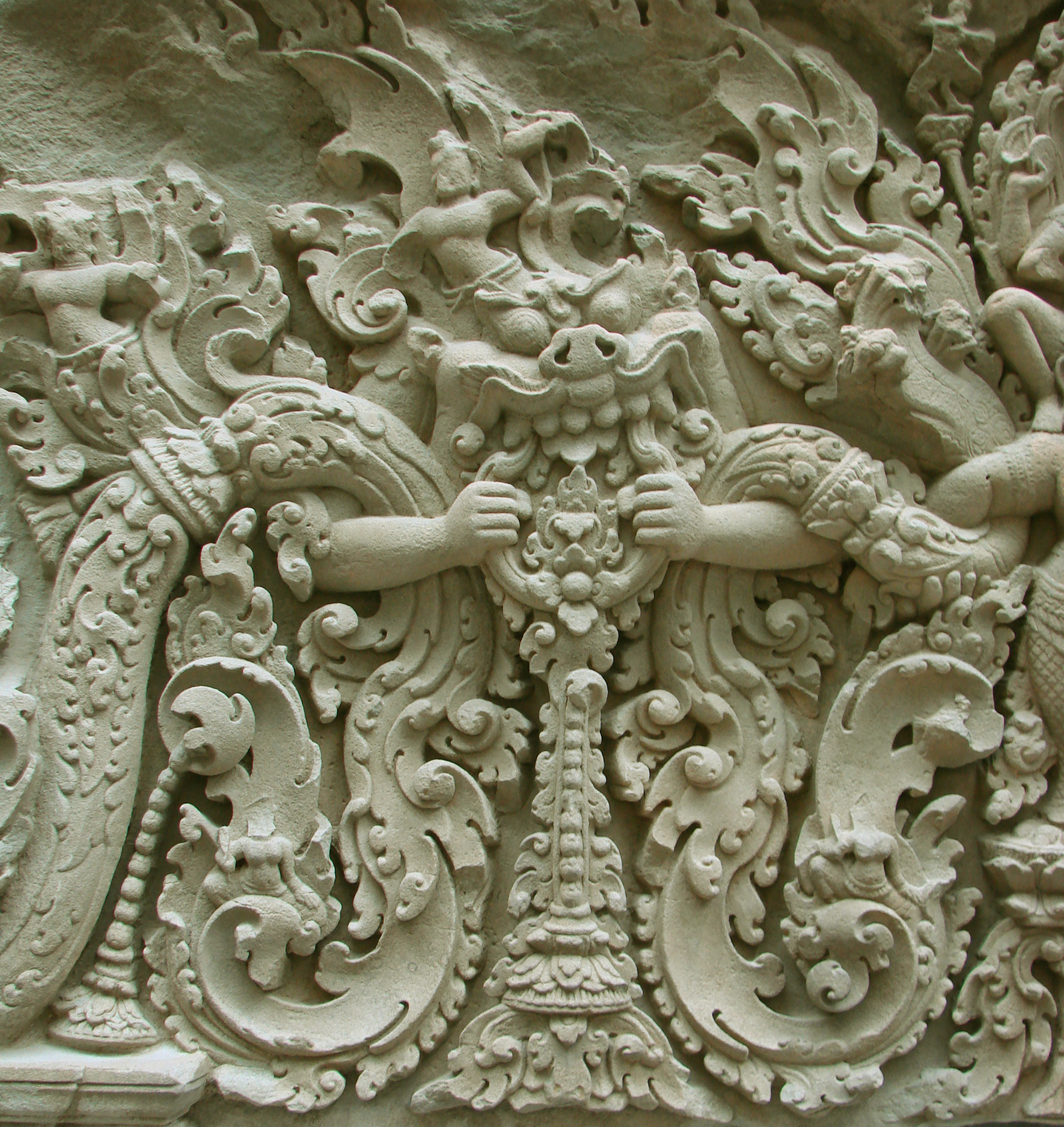
Kirtimukha at Prasat Kok Po A, Angkor, Siemreap, Cambodia. 9th century

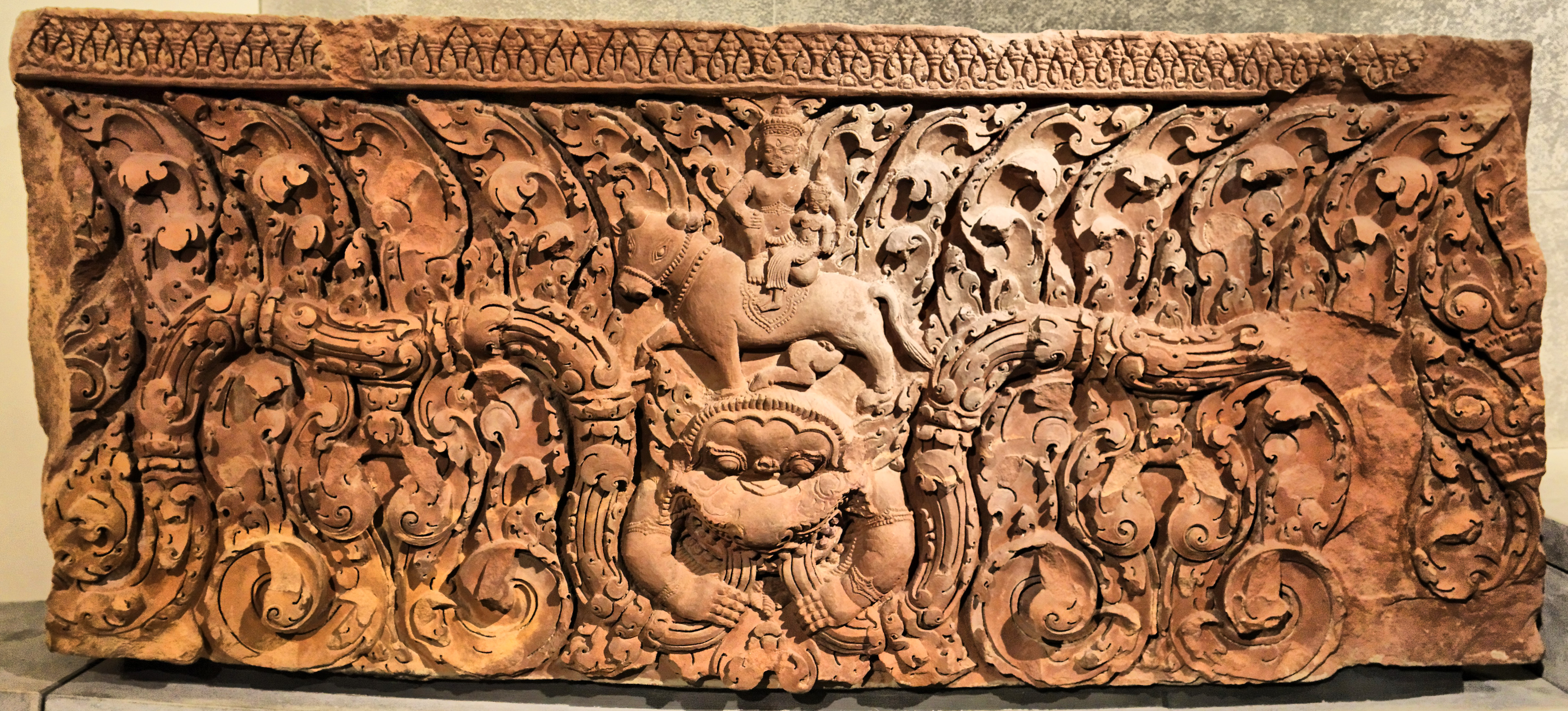
Khmer Kirtimukha lintel at Vat Kralanh, Cambodia, Baphuon, Angkor style, 11th century

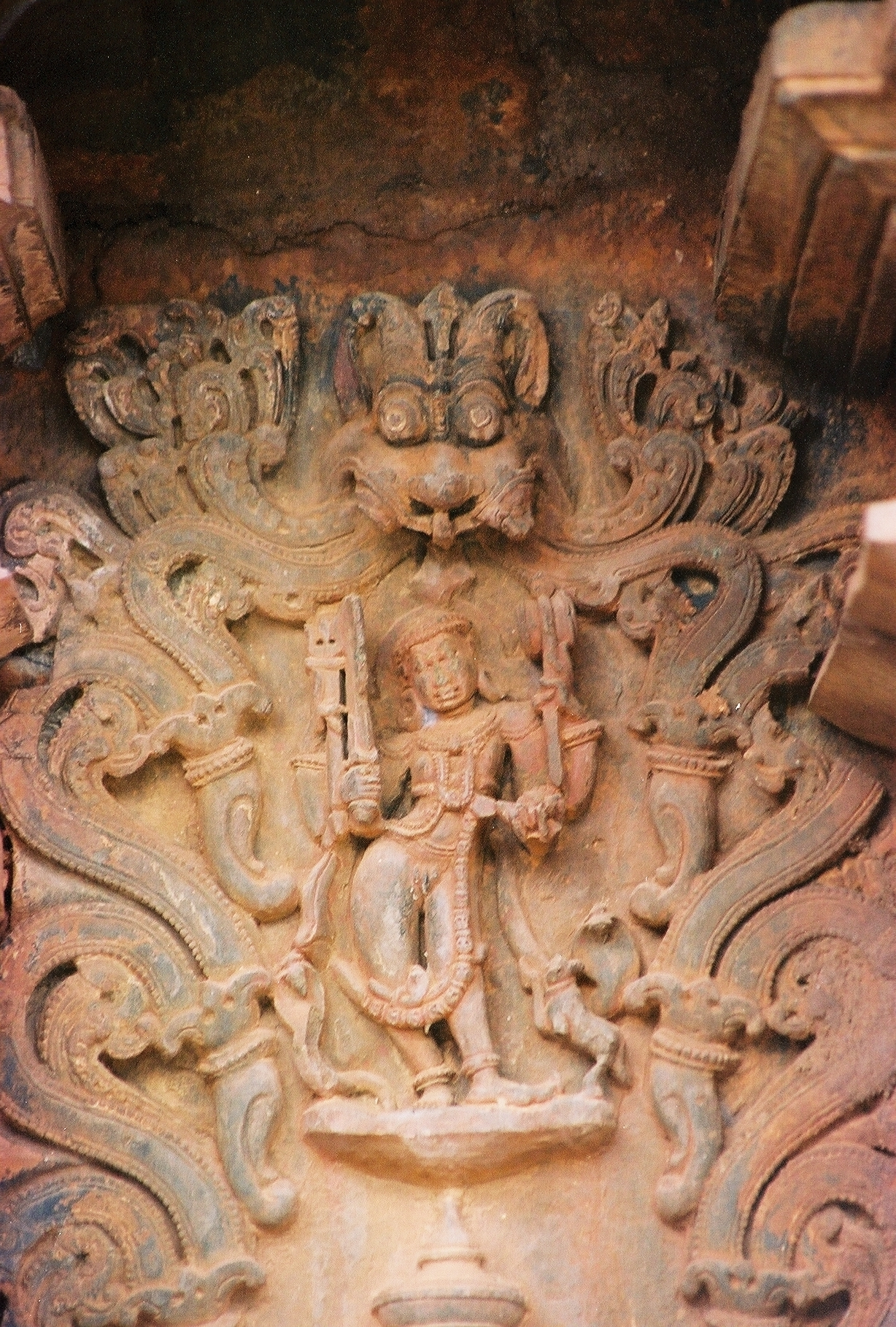
Kirthimukha at Siddhesvara temple in Haveri, Karnataka state, India

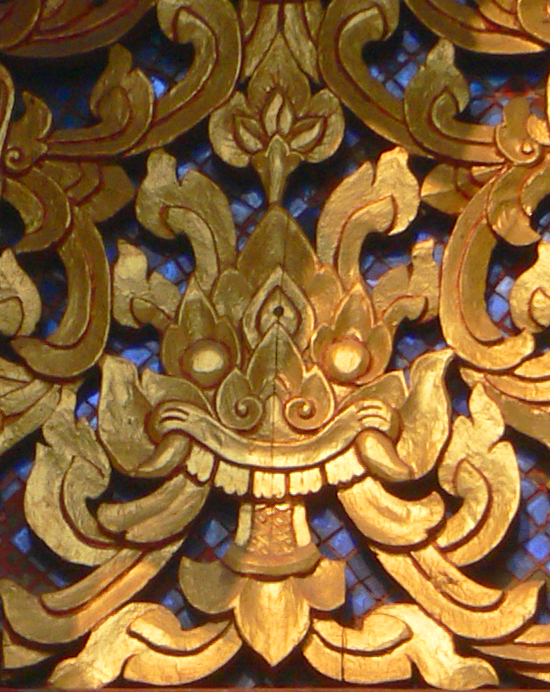
A Thai Kirthimukha at 'Wat Baan Ping' in Chiang Mai, Thailand

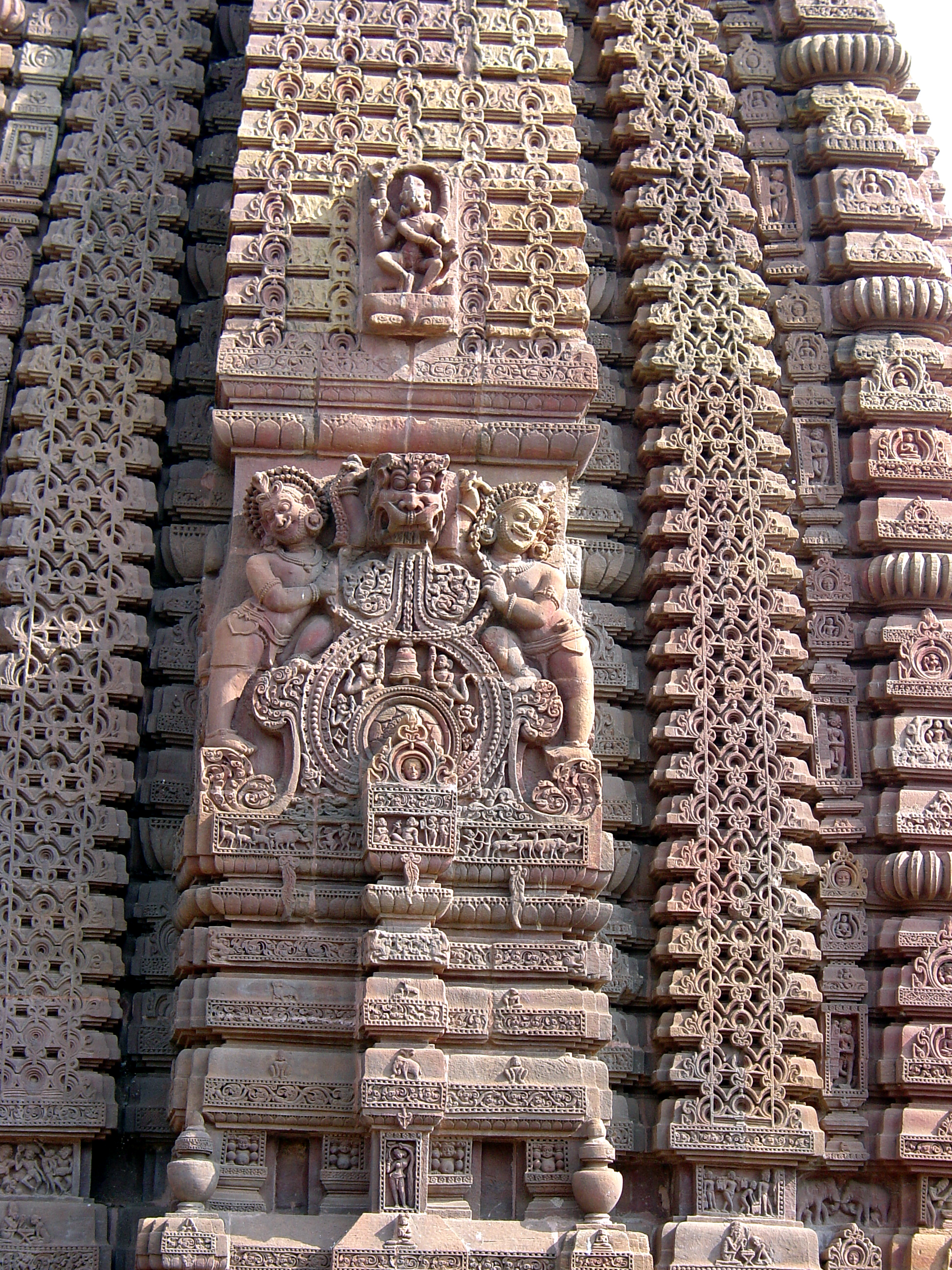
Kirthimukha at Mukteshvara Temple in Bhubaneshwar, Odisha (India)

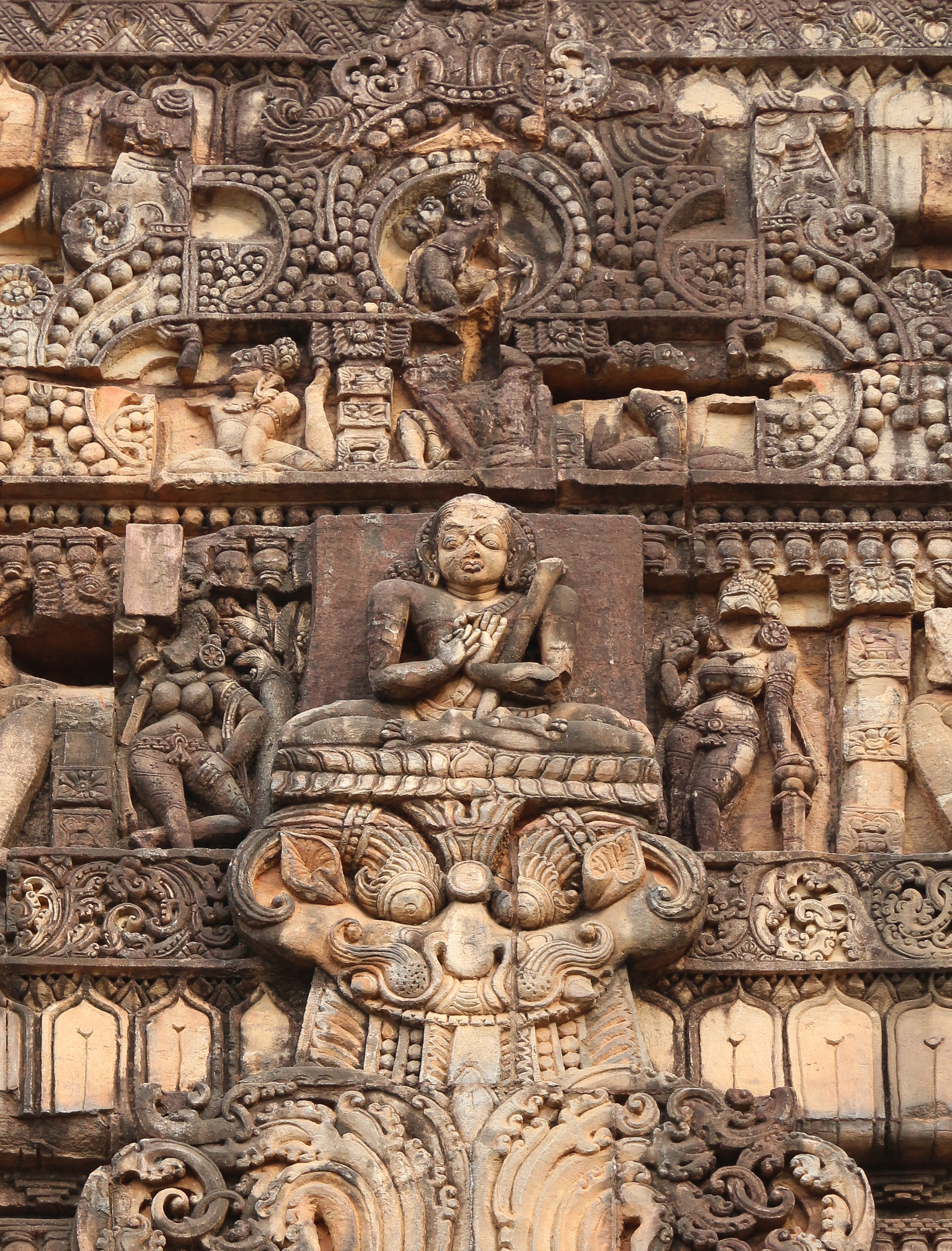
Kirthimukha at Parashurameshvara Temple in Bhubaneshwar, Odisha (India)

== See also ==
- Bhavacakra
- Rahu
- Bhoma
- Batara Kala
