= Lemminkäinen's Mother =

Painting by Akseli Gallen-Kallela

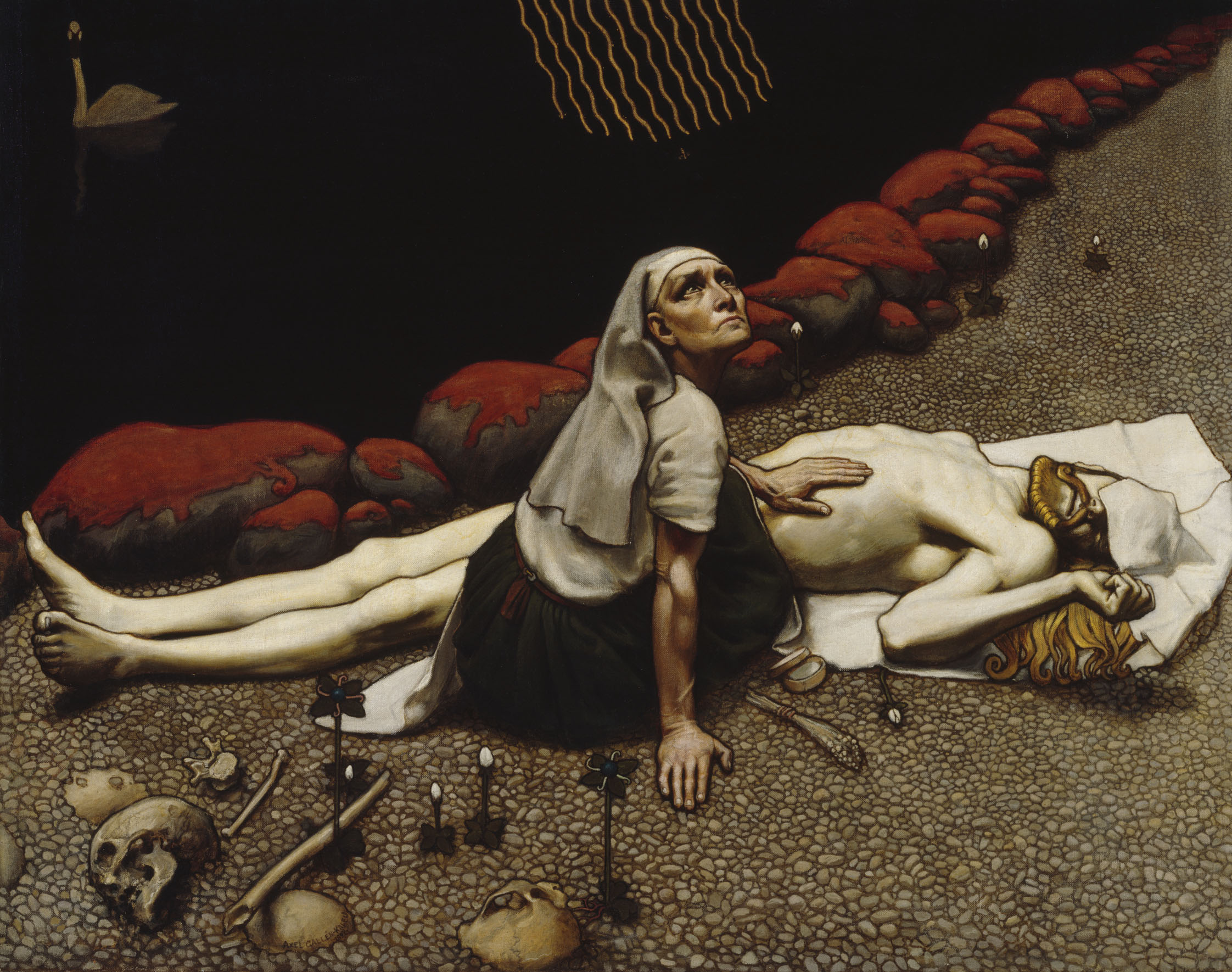
- Artist: Akseli Gallen-Kallela
- Year: 1897
- Medium: Tempera
- Dimensions: 85 cm × 108.5 cm (33 in × 42.7 in)
- Location: Ateneum, Helsinki

Lemminkäinen's Mother (Lemminkäisen äiti) is an 1897 Romantic nationalist painting by Finnish painter Akseli Gallen-Kallela. The painting illustrates a passage from the Kalevala, the Finnish national epic compiled by Elias Lönnrot in the 19th century.

The painting depicts a scene from a poem where the hero Lemminkäinen has died and his mother has dredged the pieces of her son's lifeless body from the river of Tuonela and sewn them together again. She is shown with the body in pietà style, waiting for the bee, a messenger of the god Ukko (god of the sky, weather, harvest, and thunder), to bring her honey from the gods to bring her son to life again.
