= Nabagatai =

In Fijian mythology, Nabagatai is a village on the road to Bulu, where the souls of the dead live (Williams and Calvert 1858:245).

== See also ==
- Bulu (Fijian mythology)
- Burotu
