= Balinese mythology =

Indonesian traditional mythology

Balinese mythology is the system of myths, cosmological ideas, divine beings, and symbolic narratives that underpin Balinese Hinduism, the predominant religion of the island of Bali, Indonesia. It represents a syncretic tradition shaped by Indian Hindu and Buddhist influences, Javanese folklore and mythology, and older indigenous Balinese beliefs based on animism and ancestor worship. It is expressed primarily through ritual practice, architecture, performance, and visual art, although it is underpinned by scripture including Sanskrit epics such as the Ramayana and Mahabhrata.

Balinese mythology functions as a living cosmology, structuring religious life, social organisation, and spatial orientation on the island. Balinese mythology differs from Indian Hindu mythology in both emphasis and structure. While drawing heavily on stories such as the Ramayana and Mahabharata, Balinese traditions reinterpret these narratives within a local framework that prioritises ritual balance, communal harmony, and the management of unseen forces.

Myth is not treated as distant or purely symbolic; instead, mythological beings are considered actively present in temples, sacred objects, performances, and natural features of the landscape.

== Mythological worldview ==
A defining feature of Balinese mythology is the constant interaction between Sekala (the visible, material world) and Niskala (the invisible, spiritual world). Balinese mythology understands reality as operating simultaneously in sekala and niskala. Events in the human world—illness, prosperity, conflict, or harmony—are often interpreted as the visible consequences of actions or disturbances in the unseen realm.

Mythological narratives provide the explanatory framework for this relationship, describing gods, spirits, and ancestral beings who move between these realms, shaping human destiny and natural phenomena. This dual structure reinforces the broader mythological principle of Rwa Bhineda, the coexistence of opposing yet interdependent forces.

== Creation and cosmic origin ==
Balinese myths describe the universe as emerging from an unknowable primordial source associated with the concept of the supreme god Sang Hyang Widhi Wasa, which exists beyond both sekala and niskala. This source is not the subject of detailed narrative but is invoked symbolically as the origin of all being.

Creation narratives in Balinese mythology do not exist as a single, unified creation myth. Instead, they consist of layered mythological cycles explaining how order emerges from primordial chaos, how the gods establish cosmic structure, and how the visible world (sekala) comes into being from unseen forces (niskala).

Among the most important of these narratives is the myth of the Samudra Manthana, the Churning of the Sea of Milk, which is related to the Indian Kshira Sagara and plays a central role in Balinese cosmological imagination. In this narrative, the gods (dewa) and antigods (asura) cooperate to churn the Sea of Milk, a primordial cosmic ocean, in order to obtain amerta (the elixir of immortality).

Balinese cosmology is commonly described as a tripartite universe:

- Swah Loka – the upper, divine realm
- Bwah Loka – the human world
- Bhur Loka – the lower or chthonic realm

These realms are reflected in temple layouts, village planning, and domestic compounds. Mountains are regarded as sacred points of connection between realms, with Mount Agung occupying a central cosmological role as the island’s spiritual axis.

== Pantheon of gods, demons, and spirits ==
The Balinese mythological pantheon is not organised as a rigid hierarchy but as a dynamic system of divine, demonic, and spiritual beings operating across the visible (sekala) and invisible (niskala) realms. These beings are defined less by absolute moral categories than by function, power, and relationship to cosmic balance. Gods, demons, and spirits all play necessary roles in sustaining the universe.

=== Dewata ===
Balinese gods (dewa) are manifestations of divine power rather than independent creator figures. Many are adapted from Hindu tradition but reinterpreted within Balinese cosmology and ritual practice.

Prominent deities include:

- Shiva – god of destruction and renewal, embodying transformative power.
- Brahma – god of creation, associated with origin and cosmic emergence.
- Vishnu – god of preservation, maintaining cosmic order and balance.
- Dewi Sri – goddess of rice and fertility, source of agricultural abundance and life.
- Durga – goddess of fierce protection and destruction, associated with wild and liminal forces.
- Saraswati – goddess of knowledge, learning, and sacred wisdom.
- Batara Kala – god of time and destructive energy, associated with chaos and dangerous transition.

=== Protective and mediating beings ===
Between gods and demons exist powerful mediating figures that protect human communities and regulate spiritual forces. Examples include:

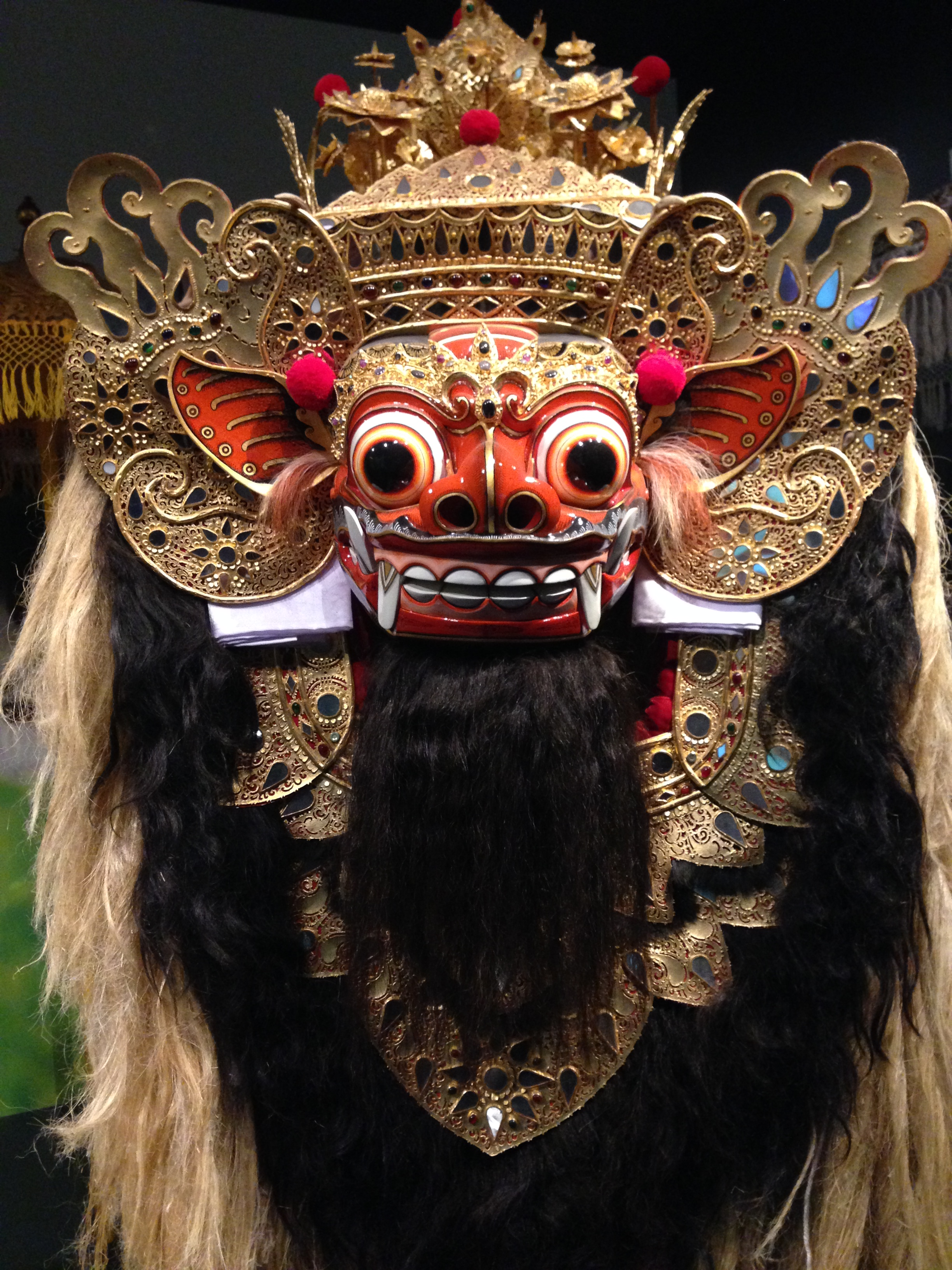
Barong, enemy of the Léyak in folklore

Barong - a central mythological figure representing protective, ordering power. Often depicted as a lion-like or composite creature, Barong is associated with village guardianship and ritual protection. In myth and performance, Barong does not destroy chaos but contains and counterbalances it.

Naga Besuki - emerges as a gigantic serpent whose meditation and movement participate in creation. Naga Basuki embodies cosmic balance and protective life force.

Twalen - a protective and mediating figure in Balinese mythology who appears as a wise clown-servant in wayang narratives. Though outwardly humble and comic, Twalen embodies ancestral wisdom and moral truth, often acting as a guide who reveals deeper cosmic realities and restores balance between gods, humans, and spirits.

=== Demonic figures and destructive forces ===
Balinese mythology recognises destructive beings not as embodiments of evil, but as necessary expressions of cosmic energy that become dangerous when left unmanaged. Examples include:

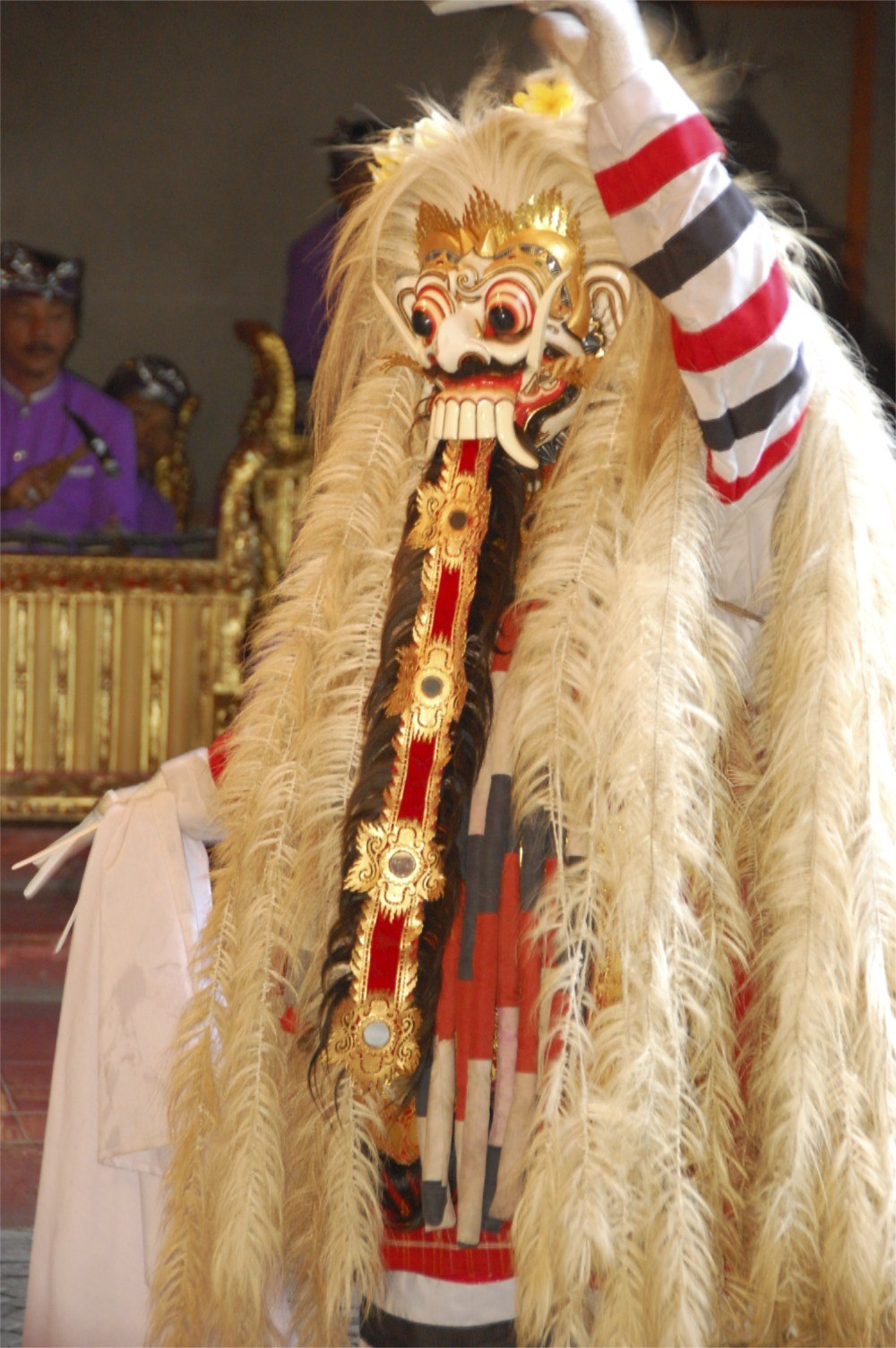
Rangda, queen of the leyaks

Rangda - the most prominent demonic figure in Balinese mythology. She represents destructive power, disease, and transgression, and is mythologically opposed to Barong.Their conflict symbolises the perpetual struggle between ordering and dissolving forces, a struggle that is never conclusively resolved.

Leyaks - malevolent beings associated with sorcery, night, and the manipulation of unseen forces. In Balinese mythology, leyaks are often humans who, through forbidden knowledge, operate in the niskala realm to cause illness, misfortune, and death in the sekala world. They are closely linked to Rangda, sometimes described as her followers or manifestations of her power, and represent the constant threat posed by uncontrolled spiritual energy.

Bhuta Kala - often appear as monstrous beings, symbolizing excess or ego, but they also serve as protectors when properly honored.

Kala Rau - a demonic being associated with eclipses and cosmic disruption. Mythologically, Kala Rau attempts to devour the sun or moon, symbolising moments when cosmic order temporarily breaks down before being restored.

== Aspects of Balinese mythology ==
- Antaboga
- Bedawang Nala
- Barong
- Bhoma - known as the Son of the Earth
- Rangda - a wicked witch and practitioner of black magic
- Setesuyara
- Batara Kala
- Semara
- Tjak
- Takshaka
- The Awan
- Perfumed Heaven
- Galungan
- Calon Arang
- Celuluk
- Leyak (or Leák)
- Vasuki - the serpent king that accompanies Shiva

== Creation myth ==
At the beginning of time, only Antaboga the world snake existed. Antaboga meditated and created the world turtle Bedawang. Two snakes lie on top of the world turtle, as does the Black Stone, which forms the lid of the underworld. The underworld is ruled by the goddess Setesuyara and the god Batara Kala, who created light and the earth. Above the earth lies a series of skies. Semara, god of love, lives in the floating sky, and above the sky lies the dark blue sky (space), home to the sun and moon. Next is the perfumed sky, which has many beautiful flowers and is inhabited by Tjak, a bird with a human face; the serpent Taksaka; and a group of snakes collectively known as the Awan, who appear as falling stars. The ancestors live in a flame-filled heaven above the perfumed heaven, and finally beyond that is the abode of the gods.

== See also ==
- Balinese Hinduism (Agama Hindu Dharma)
- Balinese people
