= Setesuyara =

Goddess in Balinese mythology

Setesuyara is the goddess of the underworld, along with Batara Kala, in traditional Balinese mythology.
