= Rohe (mythology) =

Moriori goddess

In a tradition of the Moriori people of the Chatham Islands, Rohe is married to the demi-god Māui. Beautiful Rohe was a sister of the sun, and her face shone. A quarrel arose after Rohe remarked that Māui's face was ugly. Māui then decided that they should change faces.

Afterwards Māui used magic to kill Rohe, but her spirit returned and destroyed Māui. Thus were black magic and death introduced into the world. After her death, Rohe ruled as the goddess of the pō (spirit world), where she gathered in the spirits of the dead. Evil influences were attributed to her.

== Cook Islands ==
In Mangaia, the name Ro'e appears in Te Aka-ia-Ro'e (the root of all existence) which, according to Tregear, is "a spirit in the form of a thick stem tapering to a point, and is situated at the bottom of the Universe, sustaining the Cosmos".

== Māori ==
The Māori knew little of Rohe. Tregear records the one myth associated with her, in which she is married to Māui. She was beautiful as he was ugly, and she refused his request to exchange faces. Māui, however, recited an incantation, and their faces were switched. In anger Rohe left him, and refused to live any longer in the world of light. She went to the underworld, and became a goddess of the pō (night or spirit world). Rohe is said sometimes to beat the spirits of deceased as they pass through her realm. Her home is in that division of the night world called Te Uranga-o-te-rā. Māui and Rohe had a son named Rangihore, the god of rocks and stones.

== Tahiti ==
In Tahiti, the 'Father of Famine' is called Rohe-upo'o-nui (Large-headed Rohe).

== Cited works ==
- Craig, R. D. (1989). Dictionary of Polynesian Mythology. New York: Greenwood Press. ISBN 9780313258909.
- Gill, W. W. (1876). Myths and Songs from the South Pacific. London: Henry S. King.
- Shand, A. (June 1894). "The Moriori People of the Chatham Islands: Their Traditions and History". The Journal of the Polynesian Society. Volume 3, no. 2. pp. 76–92. JSTOR 20701329.
- Tregear, E. R. (1891). Maori-Polynesian Comparative Dictionary. Lambton Quay, Wellington, NZ: Lyon and Blair.
