= Uranga-o-te-rā =

In Māori mythology, Te Uranga-o-te-rā is the fifth-lowest level of the underworld, ruled by Rohe, the wife of Māui, where "she kills all the spirits she can."
