= Ratumaibulu =

In the mythology of Fiji, Ratumaibulu is a god of great importance who presides over agriculture. In the month called Vula-i-Ratumaibulu, he comes from Bulu, the world of spirits, to make the breadfruit and other fruit trees blossom and yield fruit. He is said to be a snake god.

== See also ==
- Nabagatai
- Vatanitawake
