= Bulu (Fijian mythology) =

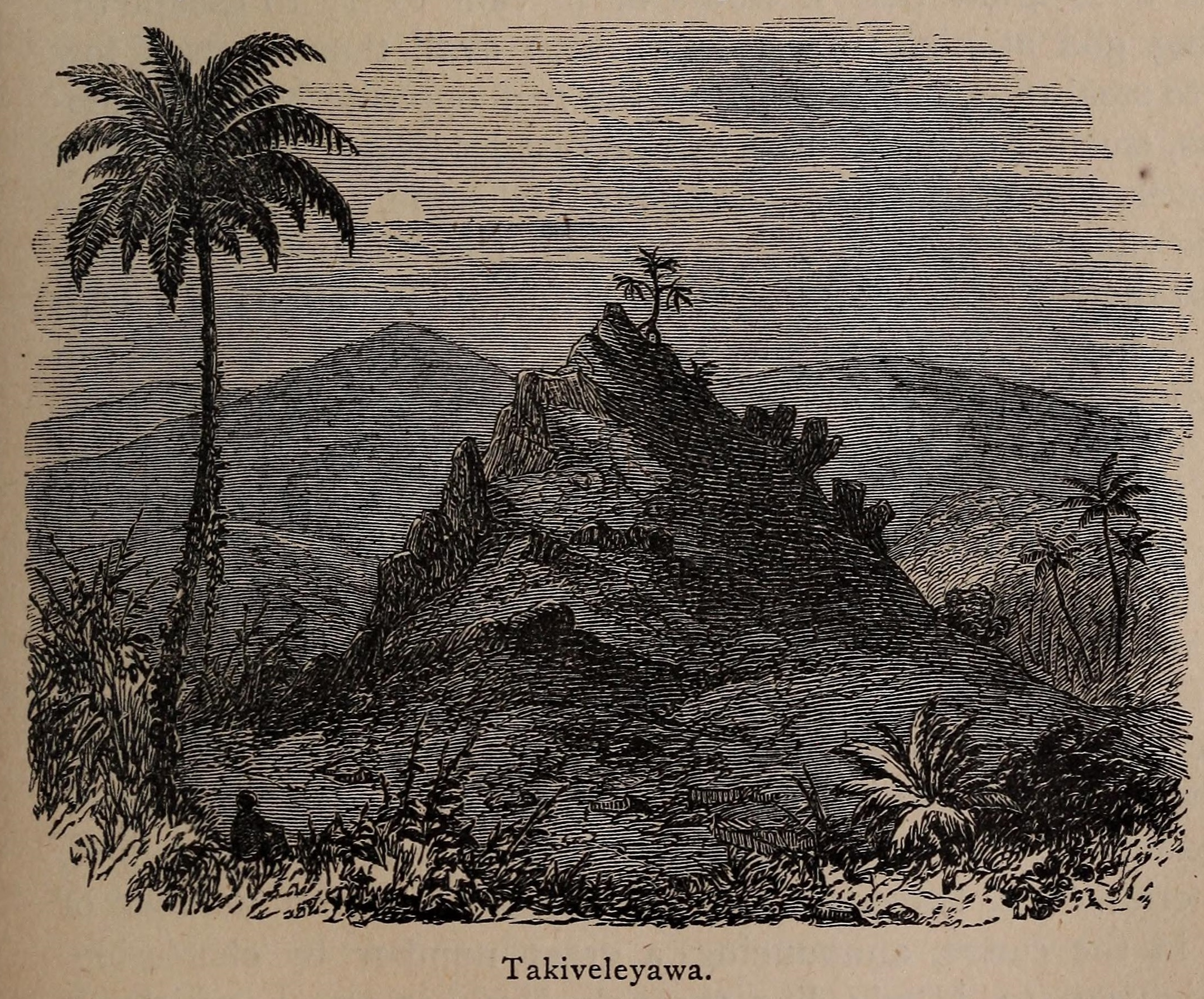
Takiveleyawa, a hill on the pathway of souls to Bulu

In Fijian mythology, Bulu (pronounced: Mbúlu) is a name for the 'world of spirits' (presumably the underworld). In the month called Vula-i-Ratumaibulu, the god Ratumaibulu comes from Bulu, the world of spirits, to make the breadfruit and other fruit trees blossom and yield fruit. Ratumaibulu is a god of great importance who presides over agriculture.

Another source refers to a "place called 'Nabagatai' on the road to 'Bulu', the separate state or land of souls".

The most westerly point of the island of Vanua Levu was the place from which the departed spirits started out for Bulu, the eternal abode of the blessedd (Freese 2005:70).

== See also ==
- Burotu
- Pulotu
