= Tuonela =

Realm of the dead in Finnish mythology

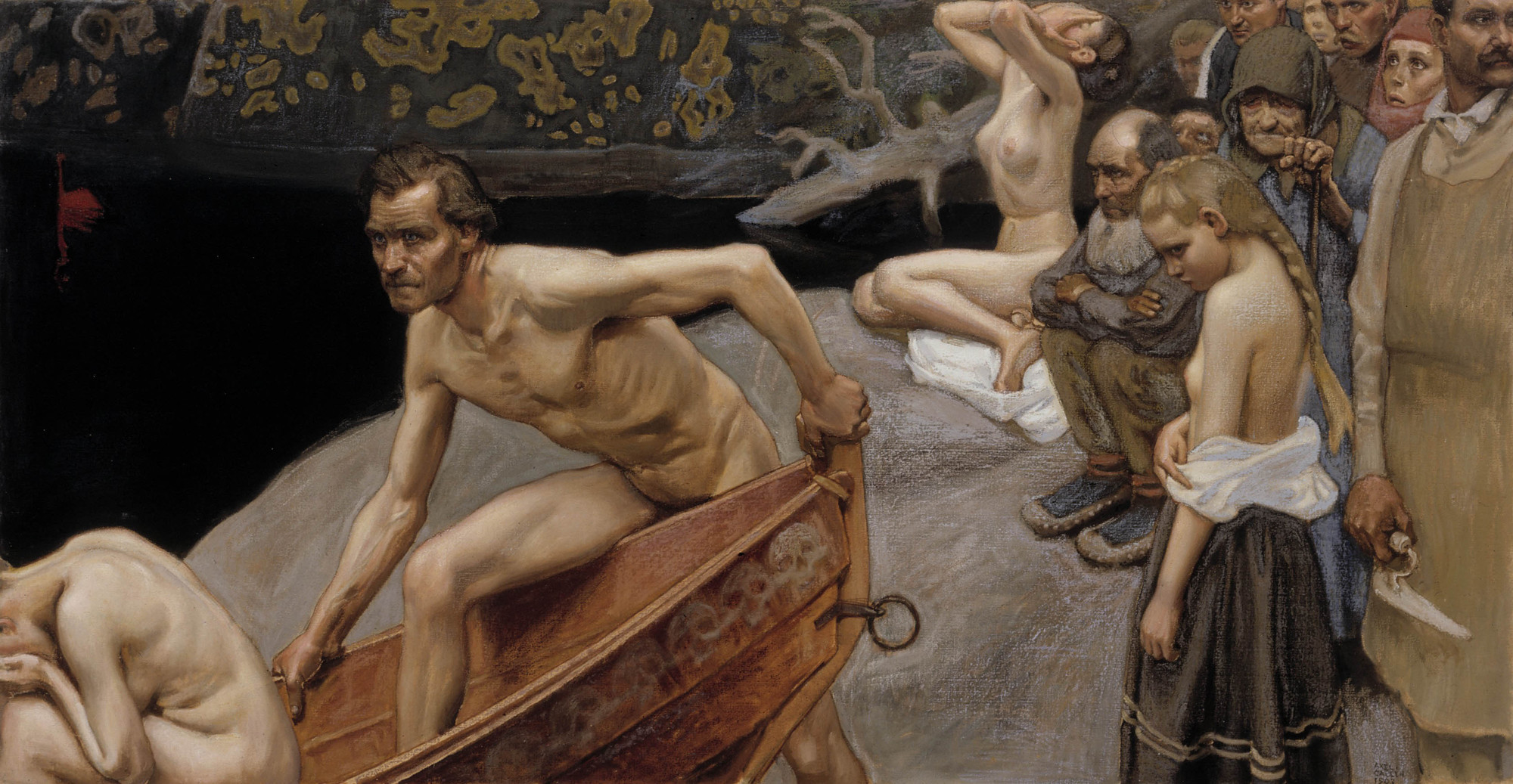
By the river of Tuonela (Tuonelan joella) by Akseli Gallen-Kallela, 1903

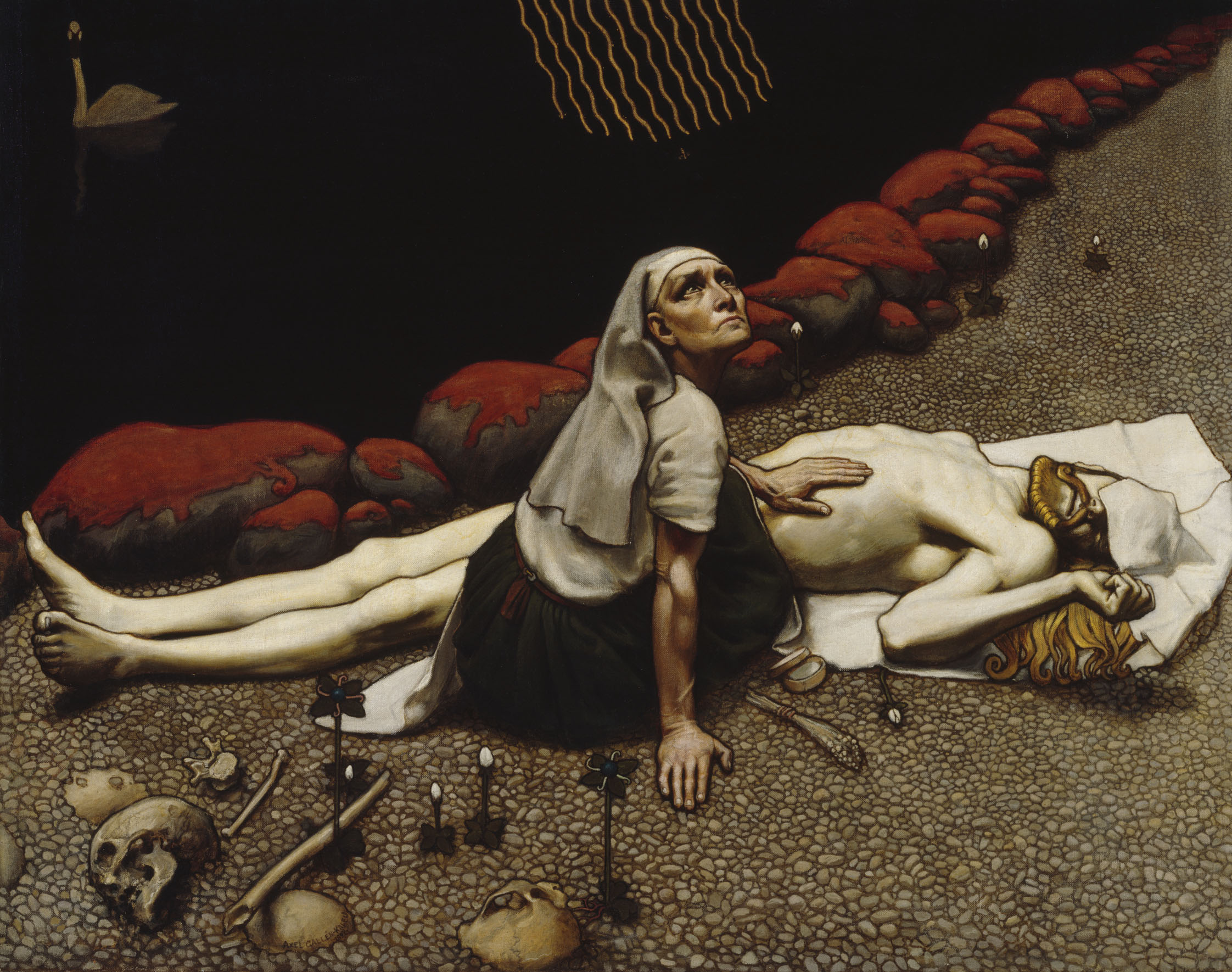
Lemminkäisen äiti by Akseli Gallen-Kallela. The mother of young Lemminkäinen has gone to the river of Tuoni to find the corpse of her dead son. One of the myths told in Kalevala.

Tuonela (Finnish: [ˈtuo̯nelɑ]; lit. 'Tuoni's abode') is the realm of the dead or the Underworld in Finnish mythology. Tuonela, Tuoni (pronounced [ˈtuo̯ni]), Manala (pronounced [ˈmɑnɑlɑ], 'Underworld'), Vainajala (pronounced [ˈvɑinɑjɑlɑ]) and Mana (pronounced [ˈmɑnɑ]) are used synonymously. Similar realms appear in most Finnic cultural traditions, including among Karelian, Ingrian, and Estonian beliefs. In Estonian mythology, the realm is called Toonela or Manala. Tuonela can also refer to a grave or a graveyard.

== Description ==
According to the Finnish pagan faith, the fate of good and bad people is the same and the dead wander the afterlife as shadow-like ghosts. In the Kalevala, Tuoni, god of the dead, and his wife Tuonetar are the rulers of Tuonela. Although physical descriptions of Tuonela vary between different versions of the myth, a general description emerges from most.

In runic songs, Pohjola is often synonymous with Tuonela, though Pohjola has also gained additional meanings in epic poetry over the ages. In this tradition, the ruler of the underworld is the icy Loviatar. Northern peoples, including Finns, had certain dualistic views of the cosmos: on the lower side is death, dark, north and cold, as opposed to the upper side: life, bright, south and warm.

According to scholars Felix Oinas and Juha Pentikäinen, Tuonela is described as being at the northernmost part of the world but is sectioned apart from the world of the living by a great divide. In the divide flows the dark river of Tuonela. The river is wild, and the dead can be seen trying to swim across it. The dead must cross the river, either by a thread bridge, swimming, or taking a boat piloted by the daughter of Tuoni. The river is guarded by a black swan that sings death spells.

At times living people visited Tuonela to gather information and spells. The journey required a trip through thorn thickets and dangerous woods, and the defeat of the monster Surma, a flesh-tearing monster that works for the goddess of decay, Kalma. Once in Tuonela, the living were not allowed to leave. They would be welcomed by Tuonetar, who would offer them a memory-erasing beer to erase their former lives. Shamans could visit Tuonela by falling into a trance and tricking the guards.

== Tuonela in other beliefs and myths ==
Tuonela is best known for its appearance in the Finnish national epic Kalevala, which is a collection of Finnish and Karelian mythology.

In the 19th song of Kalevala, Väinämöinen, a shamanistic hero, travels to Tuonela to seek the knowledge of the dead. On the journey, he meets the ferryman, a woman, Tuonen tytti / Tuonen tyttö (transl. Tuoni’s girl), or Tuonen piika (transl. Tuoni's maid), who takes him over the river of Tuoni. In paganism, this ferryman might be the same figure as Kivutar. On the isle of Tuoni, however, he is not given the spells that he was looking for and he barely manages to escape the place by turning into a snake. After his return, he curses anyone trying to enter the place alive.

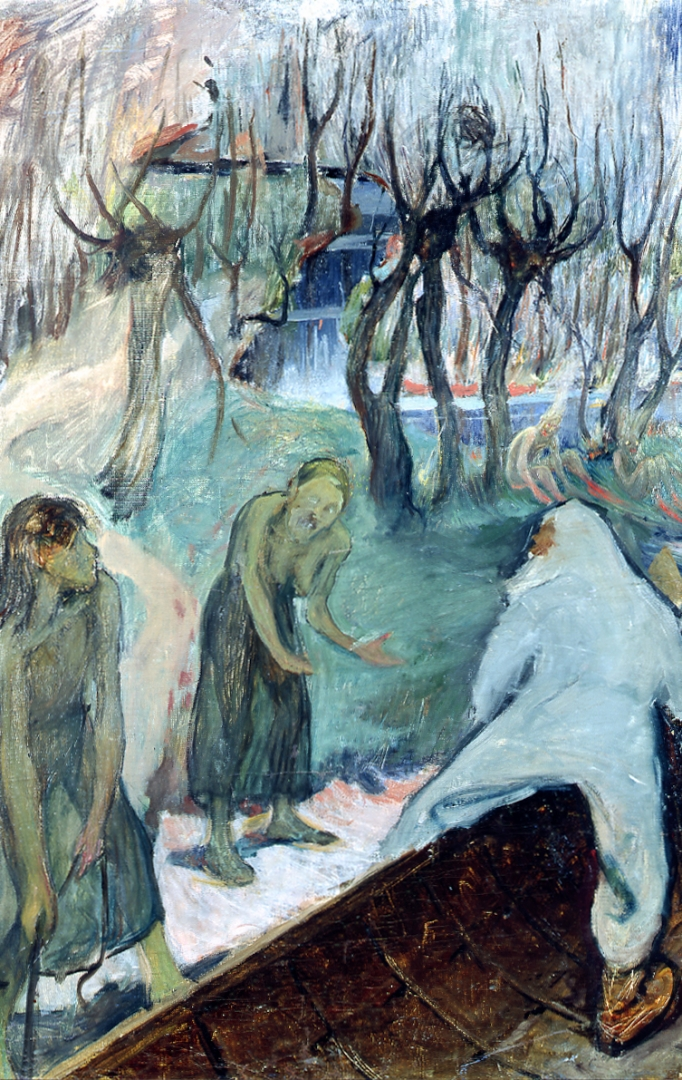
Väinämöinen in Tuonela (1890) by Pekka Halonen

Also in the Kalevala, the adventurer-shaman Lemminkäinen goes to Pohjola to woo the daughter of Louhi, a powerful old sorceress. Louhi gives Lemminkäinen three tasks he must complete to woo her daughter. While trying to complete the third task, killing the swan of Tuonela, Lemminkäinen is cut into pieces by a water snake and thrown into a whirlpool in the river of Tuonela. Lemminkäinen's mother is alerted of his death by a magical charm. She goes to the river, and rakes out the pieces of her son's body. With the help of a bee, Lemminkäinen's mother pieces together his body, and brings him back to life.

Tuonela is used as the translation for the Greek word ᾍδης (Hades) in Finnish translations of the Bible. In Finnish Christianity, Tuonela is often interpreted as the place of the dead before the Last Judgement.

== See also ==
- The Swan of Tuonela by Jean Sibelius
- Tuonela Planitia, a walled plain on Triton
