= Bhoma =

Carved grotesque decoration

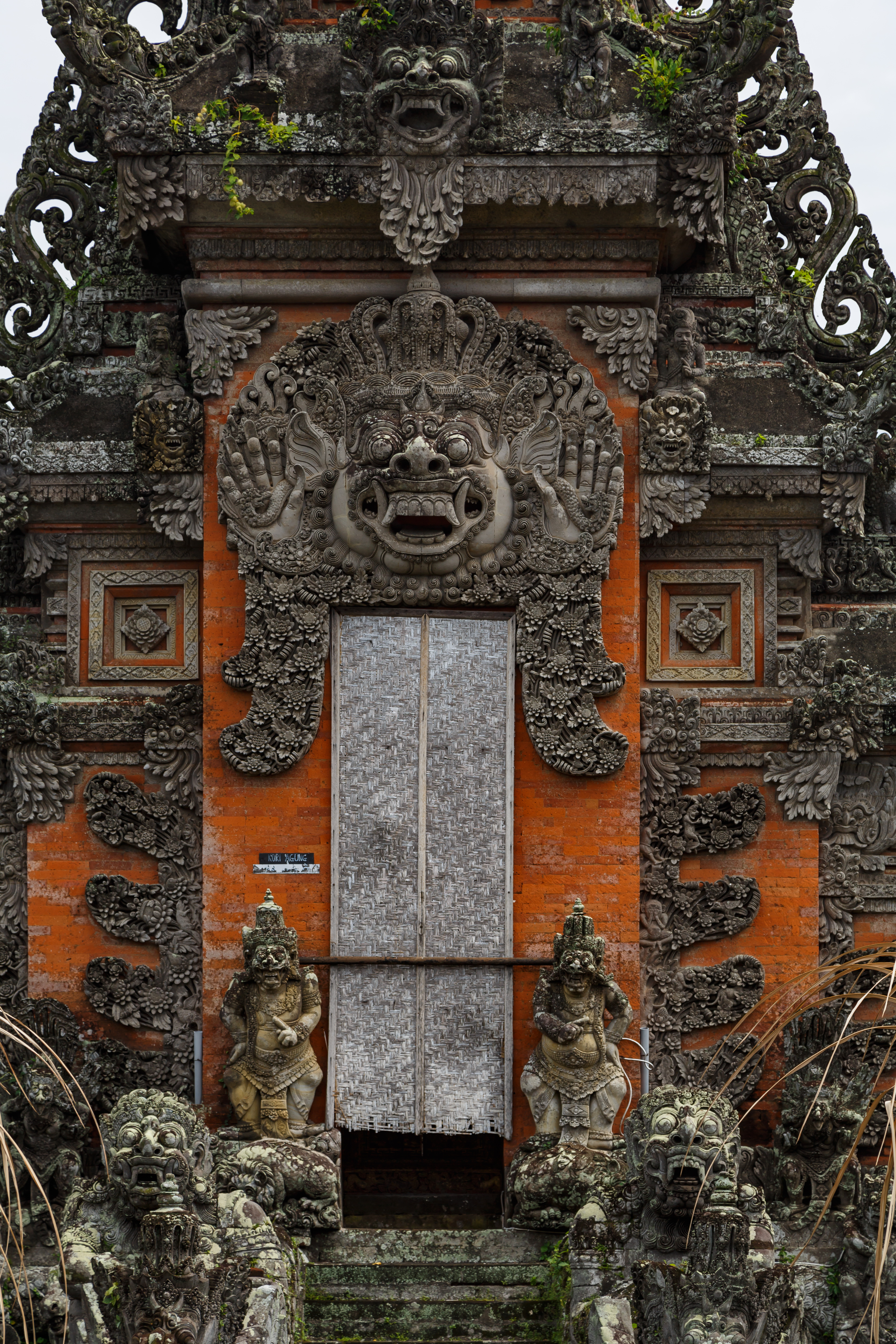
A representation of a Bhoma head guarding the top of the portal to a Balinese temple in Singapadu.

In Balinese mythology Bhoma is a primordial earth deity associated with fertility, vegetation, and the liminal space between wilderness and human settlement. The image of Bhoma is a carved or formed as grotesque face in Balinese architecture which decorates certain parts of the Balinese temple complex to ward off evil spirits.

== Mythology ==
According to legend in Balinese Hinduism, Bhoma was born from the union of Dewa Wisnu (Vishnu) and Dewi Pertiwi, the earth goddess. In one version of the myth, Dewa Brahma and Dewa Wisnu challenged one another’s powers and created an immense column of energy extending between heaven and earth. While Dewa Wisnu transformed himself into a boar to search for the base of the column, Dewa Brahma ascended to find its summit. During this cosmic event, Dewa Wisnu encountered Dewi Pertiwi, and from their union Bhoma was conceived.

Bhoma is said to have emerged from the earth itself, taking form in forests, trees, and vegetation—symbolising life arising where water meets land. The word Bhoma comes from the Sanskrit word bhaumá, which means something that grows or is born from earth or something related to the earth.

His face, often depicted above temple gates and entrances, represents the generative and protective power of nature. Depending on a viewer’s intention, Bhoma’s expression may appear benevolent or fearsome, reflecting the dual potential of the natural world to nurture or to destroy.

== Architecture ==
Depictions of Bhoma in Balinese architecture is similar to Indian kirtimukha motifs. In Balinese temple architecture, the Bhoma has the same function as the Javanese Kala who acts as the guardian spirit of the temple complex. The head of Bhoma can be found carved at the temple gate which marks the entrance to the holiest part of the shrine (paduraksa) and at the base of the padmasana, the holiest and most central shrine in the Balinese temple.

Bhoma may also be added as a feature on the padmasana shrine which is dedicated to the supreme god Sang Hyang Widhi Wasa. Like many religious constructions in Indonesia, the padmasana is divided into three sections, from the base to the top, the bhur (world of demons), bhuwah (world of men), and swah (world of gods). The head figure of Bhoma can be added above the base of the padmasana, above the Bedawang Nala (the world-supporting turtle) and the two dragons (Anantaboga and Basuki), a symbol of man's earthly needs. In this context, the head of Bhoma at the base of the padmasana symbolizes the forest which surrounds the foot of a mountain (batur pepalihan).

In some Balinese houses, the doorway to some enclosed pavilion (e.g. the bale meten) is decorated with ornaments to form a ventilation grill which is sometimes paneled. This is usually topped with a decorative frieze, which is sometimes carved in the form of the Bhoma's head.

The head of Bhoma is also seen in the Balinese cremation towers.

== See also ==
- Kirtimukha
- Batara Kala

== Cited works ==
- Davison, Julian; Granquist, Bruce (2012). Balinese Architecture. Tuttle Publishing. ISBN 9781462908684.
- Eiseman, Fred B. (2011). Bali - Sekala & Niskala: Essays on religion, ritual, and art. Tuttle Publishing. ISBN 9781462900923.
- Slattum, Judy (2003). Balinese Masks: Spirits of an Ancient Drama. Periplus. ISBN 9780794600754.
