= Burotu =

In the Melanesian mythology of Fiji, Burotu is the paradise-underworld. Newly dead souls are judged by Degei, and a few go to Burotu. The rest go to Murimuria.

== See also ==
- Bulu, said to be the name for the Fijian 'land of death'
- Pulotu, a similar concept in the Polynesian cultures of Tonga and Samoa
