= Batara Kala =

Javanese and Balinese god of the underworld

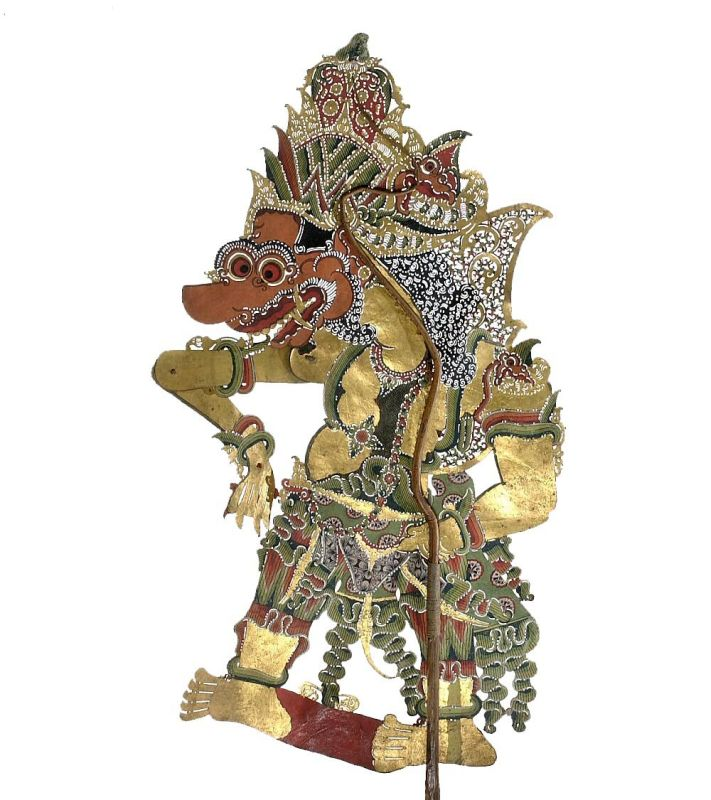
- A Wayang figure of Batara Kala.
- Grouping: Legendary creature
- Sub grouping: Undead
- Family: Child of Shiva, Durga
- Country: Indonesia
- Region: Java

Batara Kala is the god of death in traditional Javanese and Balinese mythology, ruling over it in a cave along with Setesuyara. Batara Kala is also named the creator of light and the earth. He is also the god of time, who devours unlucky people.

== Origin myth ==
According to legend, Batara Kala is the son of Batara Guru (the Javanese version of Shiva). Batara Guru has a very beautiful wife named Dewi Uma (Parvati). One day Batara Guru, in a fit of uncontrolled lust, forced himself on Dewi Uma. They had sexual intercourse on top of his vahana Nandi, a divine cow. This behavior ashamed Uma, who cursed both of them so they appeared as fearsome and ugly ogres. This fierce form of Dewi Uma is also known in Hinduism as Durga. From this relationship, Batara Kala was born with the appearance of an ogre.

Another origin story is that he was conceived when a drop of Shiva's semen was swallowed by a fish.

Batara Kala is described as having an insatiable appetite and being very rude. He was sent by the devas to Earth to punish humans for their evil habits. However, Batara Kala was interested only in devouring humans to satisfy his appetite. Alarmed, the devas then recalled Batara Kala from the Earth. He later became ruler of the underworld, together with the goddess Setesuyara.

Traditionally, Javanese people try to obtain his favor, as the god of time and destruction, to prevent misfortune, especially to children. Exorcism ceremonies, called ruwatan, are held for children born under "unlucky" circumstances, such as being born feet-first. This is to prevent such children from being devoured by Batara Kala. This ceremony usually includes a wayang (Javanese shadow puppets) performance and a selamatan feast.

== Symbolism ==
Simon Monbaron notes that Batara Kala symbolizes the negative effects of having sexual relations in a fit of passion. Batara Kala's negative aspects are described as a warning against the fate of all children born out of wedlock. Batara Kala's function, especially as a Kirtimukha, has been considered similar to Bhoma in Indian and Balinese Hinduism.
