= Degei =

Fijian god

In Fijian mythology, Degei (pronounced Ndengei), enshrined as a serpent, is the supreme god of Fiji. He is the creator of the (Fijian) world, fruits, and of men and is specially connected to Rakiraki District, Fiji. He judges newly dead souls after they pass through one of two caves: Cibaciba or Drakulu. A few he sends to paradise Burotu. Most others are thrown into a lake, where they will eventually sink to the bottom (Murimuria) to be appropriately rewarded or punished.

He is said to have at first moved about freely, but then in the form of a snake to have grown into the earth with his ringed tail. Since then he has become the god of earthquakes, storms and seasons. Whenever Degei shakes himself fertilising rain will fall, delicious fruits hang on the trees, and the yam fields yield an excellent crop.

Degei is also a god of wrath who declares himself in terrible fashion. He punishes and chastens his people by destroying the crops or by floods; he could indeed easily wipe out mankind from the earth, for since he has lived in the bowels of the earth he has been tormented with so insatiable hunger that he would like to take in and swallow the whole world.

Rokola is a name of the son of Degei.

== First human couple ==
Degei hatched an egg from which the first humans came to Earth.

== In popular culture ==
Friedrich Ratzel in The History of Mankind reported in 1896 a religious practice enjoined by Degei that involved tattooing women on the lower part of the body and the thigh, the corner of the mouth, and the finger.

R.A. Derrick (1957:11) says:

"In these traditions Degei figures not only as the origin of the people, but also as a huge snake, living in a cave near the summit of the mountain Uluda – the northernmost peak of the Nakauvandra Range. Earth tremors and thunder were ascribed as his uneasy turnings within the cave. He took no interest in his people’s affairs; his existence was no more than a round of eating and sleeping. By association with him, snakes were honoured as ‘the Offspring of the origin’. The snake cult was generally throughout the group."
