= Murimuria =

In pre-Christian Fijian mythology, Murimuria is part of the underworld. According to Fijian religion, after a man dies, his soul is brought over a stretch of water by a ferryman, and has to face many dangers on the other side by going through the Path of the Souls (Sala Ni Yalo). For unmarried men, there seems to be no chance of surviving this path, because even if they escape the Great Woman, they would be killed by the monster Nangganangga, since no one ever got away from it, while married men could survive, if they withstand the Pandanus tree and the armed giant Killer of Souls. The survivors are judged by the god called Degei. Those who had the favor of Degei (chiefs with great wealth and many wives, who were destroyers of many towns, killers of many enemies and rulers over a powerful people) are instructed not to try to cross the lake. These go to Burotu. The rest inevitably try cross the lake by a boat that always capsizes. They eventually sink to the bottom, Murimuria, and are rewarded and punished appropriately.

Murimuria is considered a place neither of happiness, nor of unhappiness. As such, residence in Murimuria is characterized by both punishment and peace. Some of the souls in Murimuria are punished for sins committed while alive. However, these sins do not necessarily correspond to Christian notions of sin. Those who did not kill an enemy in life are forced to pound muck with clubs, which is regarded as the most degrading punishment. Those who did not have their ears pierced are forced to carry upon their shoulders for ever logs of wood upon which tapa cloth is beaten out, jeered by all who see them. Women who were not tattooed are chased by ghosts who use sharp shells to tear at their skin or turn them into bread. Anyone who has done an act which displeases the gods are laid in rows on their faces and turned into taro beds.
