= Kalma (folklore) =

Personification of death in Finnish folklore

In Finnish folklore, Kalma is an abstraction or a personification of death or the grave. The word kalma means 'a grave, the smell of a corpse, a corpse'. It has cognates in other Uralic languages. In Samoyed languages kolmu or halmer means 'corpse' or 'the spirit of a dead person'. In Mordvinic languages, kalma or kalmo means 'grave'.

The word kalma occurs in the Kalevala a few times with the meaning 'graveyard', not referring to any personified deity. According to Matthias Castrén, there are other folk poems in which Kalma refers to an underground deity watching over the elves and other folk (väki) of the underworld Tuonela. This claim has been disputed by Kaarle Krohn, according to whom no such god exists in the Finnish folklore.

Other proper names associated with death in Finnish folklore are Tuoni and Mana. The latter is based on Manala, another name for the underworld, and seems to have been introduced by Elias Lönnrot, the compiler of the Kalevala. Kalma's daughter, Kalman impi (lit. 'maiden of Kalma'), is mentioned in Kalevala as an evil being who gave the snake its venomous fangs.
