= Tuoni =

Finnish deity

In Finnish mythology, Tuoni (Finnish pronunciation: [ˈtuo̯ni]) was the god of Tuonela (the world of the dead), and darkness personified. He was the husband of Tuonetar. Their children included Kipu-Tyttö, Tuonenpoika, and Loviatar, who were divinities of suffering. When in human form, he appears as an old man with three fingers on each hand and a hat of darkness.

== See also ==
- List of death deities
