= Fijian mythology =

Belief system of indigenous Fijians

Fijian mythology refers to the set of beliefs practiced by the indigenous people of the island of Fiji.

Their indigenous religion, like many others around the world, is based on cyclic existence where their ancestors and the environment exist in a dynamic cycle through experience, history and one with nature. Like a plant that bears seeds to exist, similar to humans, animals and all other life dependent of the reproductive cycle to maintain existence on earth. Fijians believe that humans exist with nature and sometimes are dominated by other species like sharks, snakes, octopuses, and more, where humans are the prey, rather than the predator.

Some primarily examples of their gods are Degei, a serpent who is the supreme god of Uluda Fiji. He is the creator of the (Fijian) world. He judges newly dead souls after they pass through one of two caves: Cibaciba or Drakulu. A few he sends to paradise Burotu or Burotukula. Most others are thrown into a lake, where they will eventually sink to the bottom (Murimuria) to be appropriately rewarded or punished.
