= List of Maya gods and supernatural beings =

This is a list of deities playing a role in the Classic (200–1000 CE), Post-Classic (1000–1539 CE) and Contact Period (1511–1697) of Maya religion. The names are mainly taken from the books of Chilam Balam, Lacandon ethnography, the Madrid Codex, the work of Diego de Landa, and the Popol Vuh. Depending on the source, most names are either Yucatec or Kʼicheʼ. The Classic Period names (belonging to the Classic Maya language) are only rarely known with certainty.

== Maya mythological beings ==
=== List Source keys ===
- CHB – Books of Chilam Balam
- LAC – Lacandon ethnography
- L – de Landa
- M — Madrid Codex
- PV – the Popol Vuh.

== A ==
=== Acan ===
The god of wine and intoxication, identified with the drink Balché.

=== Acat ===
The god of tattoos and tattooing.

=== Alom ===
The god of the sky and wood, a creator deity.

=== Ah-Muzen-Cab ===
The god of bees and honey.

=== Awilix ===
The goddess of the Moon and the night.

== B ==
=== Bacab ===
The old god of the interior of the earth and of thunder, sky-carrier, sometimes depicted as four Bacabs that each represent the directions.

=== Baalham ===
The jaguar god of the underworld. Also any of a group of jaguar gods who protected people and communities.

=== Bitol *PV* ===
A sky god. One of the creator and destroyer deities who participated in the last two attempts at creating humanity.

=== Bolontiku *CHB* ===
A group of nine underworld gods.

=== Bolon Yokteʼ ===
"Nine Strides", mentioned in the Books of Chilam Balam and in Classic inscriptions; functions unknown.

=== Buluc Chabtan [ God F ] ===
The god of war, violence, sacrifice, and gambling.

== C ==
=== Cabrakan ===
A god of mountains and earthquakes. He was a son of Vucub Caquix and Chimalmat.

=== Cacoch *LAC* ===
Also known as kacoch. Was a male creator god worshipped by the Lacandon people and associated with Acan the god of wine. He is said to have created the water lily that all other gods sprang from.

=== Camazotz *PV* ===
The god of bats, night, death, and sacrifice. He comes from a place called xibalba (the place of fright)

=== Can Tzicnal *L* ===
The Bacab of the north, associated with the color white, and the Muluc years. Son of Itzamna and Ixchel.

=== Chac *L* ===
God of rain, thunder, and lightning, wields an axe of lightning, brother to Kinich Ahau.

=== Chac Uayab Xoc *L* ===
A fish god and the patron deity of fishermen.

=== Chiccan ===
A group of four Chorti rain gods who live in lakes and make rain clouds from the water in them. As with the Bacabs, each of the rain gods was associated with a cardinal direction. Chiccan was also the name of a day in the Tzolkin cycle of the calendar.

=== Cit-Bolon-Tum ===
A god of medicine and healing

=== Chimalmat ===
A giant who was, by Vucub Caquix, the mother of Cabrakan and Zipacna.

=== Chin ===
The main god of relationships.

=== Cizin ===
A god of earthquakes and death who lived in Metnal.

=== Colel Cab ===
Goddess of the bees

=== Colop U Uichkin ===
An eclipse deity.

=== Coyopa ===
The god of thunder. Brother of Cakulha.

== E ==
=== Ek Chuaj *M* (God M) ===
Ek Chuaj, the "black war chief" was the patron god of warriors and merchants. He was depicted carrying a bag over his shoulder and wearing a Jaguar mantle. He was typically represented with a dangling lower lip, a long nose, sometimes a scorpion’s tail, and particularly in the Madrid codex he is painted all black.

== G ==
=== GI, GII, GIII ===
The three patron deities of the Palenque kingdom, made up of a sea deity with a shell ear, GII a baby lightning god (god K), and GIII the jaguar god of fire, also patron of the number seven.

== H ==
=== Hachäkʼyum *LAC* ===
Patron deity of the Lacandon.

=== Hobnil *L* ===
Bacab of the east.

=== Hozanek *L* ===
Bacab of the south.

=== Hun-Batz *PV* ===
"One Howler Monkey", one of two stepbrothers of the Hero Twins, one of the Howler Monkey Gods and patron of the arts.

=== Hun-Came *PV* ===
"One-Death", a lord of the underworld (Xibalba) who, along with Vucub-Came "Seven-Death", killed Hun Hunahpu. They were defeated by the latter's sons the Hero Twins.

=== Hun-Chowen *PV* ===
One of the two stepbrothers of the Hero Twins, one of the Howler Monkey Gods and patron of the arts.

=== Hun-Hunahpu *PV* ===
The father of the Maya Hero Twins Xbalanque and Hunahpu by a Xbaquiyalo. Defeated in Xibalba, by the co-rulers, Hun Came and Vucub Came (One Death and Seven Death).

=== Hunab Ku ===
"Sole God", identical with Itzamna as the highest Yucatec god; or a more abstract upper god.

=== Hunahpu *PV* ===
One of the Maya Hero Twins.

=== Hunahpu-Gutch *PV* ===
One of the thirteen creator gods who helped create humanity.

=== Hunahpu Utiu *PV* ===
One of the thirteen creator gods who helped to create humanity.

=== Hun-Ixim ===
"One-Maize", a reading of the name glyph of the Classic Period Tonsured Maize God

=== Hunraqan *PV* ===
"One-Leg", one of three lightning gods together called "Heart of the Sky", and acting as world creators. God of the weather, wind, storms, and fire

== I ==
=== Itzamna ===
The creator god.

=== Itzananohkʼu ===
A patron god of the Lacandon people.

=== Ixchel *L* [Goddess O] ===
Jaguar goddess of midwifery, medicine and the moon.

=== Ixik Kab/Sak Ixik *Dresden Codex* [Goddess I] ===
Goddess of the earth, fertility and weaving. Perhaps also a goddess of love, copulation and honey. May have a 16th century Popol Vuh parallel with the figure Xbaquiyalo.

=== Ixtab *L* ===
Goddess of suicide, represented with a rope around her neck.

== J ==
=== Jacawitz *PV* ===
Mountain god of the Postclassic Kʼicheʼ Maya

== K ==
=== Kʼawiil (Kawil, Kauil) ===
Assumed to have been the Classic name of God K (Bolon Dzacab). Title attested for Itzamna, Uaxac Yol, and Amaite Ku; family name; probably not meaning "food", but "powerful".

=== K'inich Ahau *L* ===
The solar deity, attested both in the 16th century by Landa as well as through iconographic consistencies in Classic Period art.

=== Kisin (Cisin) ===
The most commonly depicted god of death.

=== Kukulkan ===
"Sacred Feathered Serpent". A Pan-Mesoamerican deity figures similar to Kukulkan have his origins as early as the Olmec. The Aztec and he has been identified as the Postclassic version of the Vision Serpent of Classic Maya art. His Central Mexican counterpart was known as Quetzalcoatl. He was likely a deity of many domains, creation, wind, water, and humanity.

== M ==
=== Mam ===
A title of respect meaning "Grandfather" and applied to a number of different Maya deities including earth spirits, mountain spirits, and the four Bacabs.

=== Maximon ===
A god of travelers, merchants, medicine men/women, mischief and fertility, later conflated with Saint Simon and in modern times part of the celebrations surrounding Holy Week.

=== Moon Goddess ===
The goddess of the moon. Her primary identifying attributes are the lunar crescent and the rabbit. She appears most commonly on Classic Period ceramic vessels but can also be seen in the Dresden Codex and as a ceramic figure.

== N ==
=== Nakon ===
The god of war. A powerful god, claimed to be stronger than all the other gods of war in every other religion.

=== Nohochacyum ===
A creator-destroyer deity, the brother of the death god Kisin (or possibly another earthquake god also known as Kisin). He is the sworn enemy of the world serpent Hapikern and it is said that, in the end of days, he will destroy Hapikern by wrapping him around himself to smother him. In some versions, this will destroy life on Earth. He is related, in some stories, to Usukan, Uyitzin, Yantho and Hapikern, all of whom wish ill to human beings. Brother of Xamaniqinqu, the patron god of travelers and merchants.

== Q ==
=== Qaholom *PV* ===
One of the second set of creator gods.

=== Qʼuqʼumatz *PV* ===
Feathered Snake god and creator. The depiction of the feathered serpent deity is present in other cultures of Mesoamerica. Qʼuqʼumatz of the Kʼicheʼ Maya is closely related to the god Kukulkan of Yucatán and to Quetzalcoatl of the Aztecs.

== T ==
=== Tepeu *PV* ===
A sky god and one of the creator deities who participated in all three attempts at creating humanity.

=== Tohil *PV* ===
A patron god of the Kʼicheʼ, to whom a great temple was erected at the Kʼicheʼ capital Qʼumarkaj.

=== Tunkuruchu *PV* ===
An ancient owl, one who foretells death. At a party held by all birds, he was humiliated by some humans, and as revenge, he would visit them announcing their deaths.

== V ==
=== Vatanchu ===
"Straight God", a mountain god of the Postclassic Manche Chʼol.

=== Votan ===
Legendary ancestral deity, Chiapas.

=== Vucub-Caquix *PV* ===
A bird being, whose wife is Chimalmat and whose sons are the demonic giants Cabrakan and Zipacna.

== W ==
=== Water Lily Jaguar ===
One of the jaguar gods.

=== Wuk Sip ===
A hunting god of the Yucatec Maya arguably ears and antlers.

== X ==
=== Xaman Ek ===
The god of travelers and merchants, who gave offerings to him on the side of roads while traveling.

=== Xbalanque *PV* [god CH] ===
One of the Hero or War Twins and companion to Hunahpu.

=== Xbaquiyalo *PV* ===
First wife of Hun Hunahpu in the Popol Vuh, mother of the Monkey Twins.

=== Xcarruchan ===
A mountain god of the Postclassic Manche Chʼol.

=== Xmucane and Xpiyacoc *PV* ===
A creator god couple which helped create the first humans. They are also the parents of Hun Hunahpu and Vucub Hunahpu. They were called Grandmother of Day, Grandmother of Light and Bearer twice over, begetter twice over and given the titles midwife and matchmaker.

=== Xquic ===
She was the daughter of Cuchumaquic, one of the lords of the underworld, Xibalba. She is noted for being the mother of the Hero Twins, Hunahpu and Xbalanque and is sometimes considered to be the Maya goddess associated with the waning moon. She may have a parallel in the Classic Period Moon Goddess.

== Y ==
=== Yaluk ===
One of four Mopan "Grandfathers" of the earth and chief lightning god.

=== Yopaat ===
An important rain god at Copán and Quiriguá in the southern Maya area.

=== Yum Kaax ===
God of the woods, of wild nature, and of the hunt; invoked before carving out a maize field from the wilderness.

== Z ==
=== Zac Cimi *L* ===
The Bacab of the west.

=== Zipacna *PV* ===
A demonic personification of the earth crust.

== See also ==
- Maya death gods
- List of Aztec gods and supernatural beings
