= ACAT =

Acat or ACAT may refer to:

== Military ==
- "Avoid, Control, Accept, or Transfer", a catchphrase used in Risk Management as taught in the US Department of Defense
- Acquisition Category, a term from the US Department of Defense Instruction 5000.02 - Operation of the Defense Acquisition System; see Glossary of military modeling and simulation

== Science ==
- Acetyl-coenzyme A acetyltransferase, an enzyme
- Acyl-CoA:cholesterol acyltransferase, an intracellular protein involved in cholesterol metabolism
- ACAT1 mRNA, a messenger RNA molecule

== Psychotherapy ==
- Association for Cognitive Analytic Therapy in the UK
- International Cognitive Analytic Therapy Association
- CAT Scotland

== Other uses ==
- Acat (deity), a Mayan god of tattooing
- ACT Civil and Administrative Tribunal, Australian Capital Territory
- Asociación Continental Americana de Trabajadores, a Latin American trade union federation
- International A-class catamaran ("A-Cat"), a type of sailing craft
- Alberta Council on Admissions and Transfer, an educational organization
- Automated Customer Account Transfer Service, a financial securities transfer system
- Assistive context-aware toolkit, the open-source input method used by Stephen Hawking
