= ACATS =

ACATS may refer to:

- Ada Conformity Assessment Test Suite, the test suite used for Ada processor conformity testing
- Advisory Committee on Advanced Television Services of the US Federal Communications Commission
- Automated Customer Account Transfer Service, commonly known as ACATS, a system developed by the National Securities Clearing Corporation (NSCC) that executes the transfer of securities from a trading account at one financial institution to a trading account at another
