= Yopaat =

Maya storm god

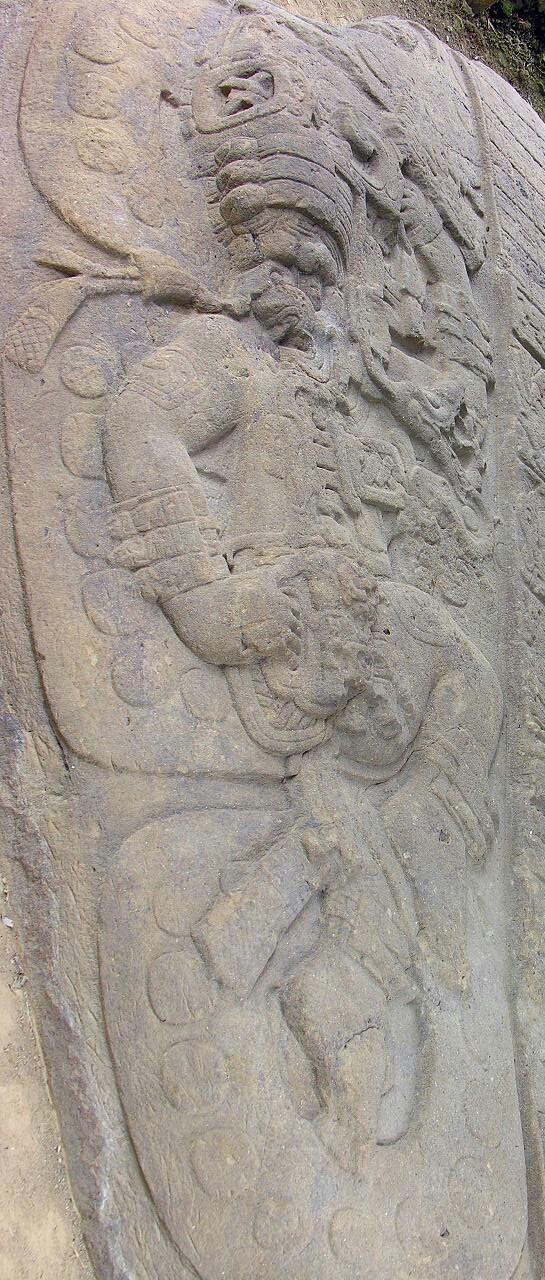
Sculpted image of Yopaat on Quirigua Altar O'

Yopaat was an important Maya storm god in the southern Maya area that included the cities of Copán and Quiriguá during the Classic period of Mesoamerican chronology (c. 250–900 AD). Yopaat was closely related to Chaac, the Maya rain god. Yopaat is depicted as bearing a flint weapon that represents a thunderbolt. Yopaat was held responsible for especially violent lightning storms, that were believed to cause earthquakes. He was often represented with a snake in place of one leg, demonstrating a close relationship with Kʼawiil, another Maya deity with similar attributes.

The deity was most important during the Late Classic period (c. 600–900 AD). Although his worship was concentrated in the Motagua Valley, glyphic inscriptions of the name occur as far away as Palenque, Yaxchilán and Toniná. Decipherment of a hieroglyphic text found at Palenque has resulted in the suggestion that Yopaat was associated with mist that forms before rainfall. The name of the deity was frequently used as a part of the names of the kings of the Quiriguá dynasty, and it is likely that Yopaat was the patron god of the city, which was subject to abundant rainfall and frequent floods.

== Etymology ==
The name Yopaat is formed from two elements – yop and aat, literally leaf-penis. This name has been tentatively linked to mythic imagery at San Bartolo, Petén, and with other deities in wider Mesoamerica that feature an oversized leaf hanging from their abdomens.

== Iconography ==
In Maya art, Yopaat is depicted using his thunderbolt weapon to crack the shell of the mythic turtle, an action that gives rise to the resurrection of the maize god. Representations of Yopaat are almost identical to representations of Chaac, except his weapon, and curved dotted elements on his head. These dotted elements may represent clouds or mist, or may be sparks. He also has stony markings on his body.
