= Ixtab =

Yucatec Maya goddess of suicide

- Goddess of suicide, possibly of hunting and snares
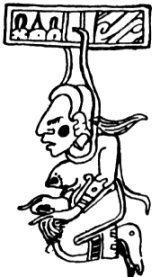
- Image from the Dresden Codex often ascribed to Ix Tab
- Symbols: Rope
- Age: Young deity
- Gender: Female

At the time of the Spanish conquest of Yucatán (1527–1546), Ix Tab or Ixtab ([iʃˈtaɓ]; "Rope Woman", "Hangwoman") was the indigenous Maya goddess of suicide by hanging. Playing the role of a psychopomp, she would accompany such suicides to heaven.

== Sources ==
The only description of the goddess occurs in the Relación of the 16th-century Spanish inquisitor Diego de Landa:

They said also and held it as absolutely certain that those who hanged themselves went to this heaven of theirs; and on this account, there were many persons who on slight occasions of sorrows, troubles or sickness, hanged themselves in order to escape these things and to go and rest in their heaven [gloria], where they said that the goddess of the gallows [la diosa de la horca], whom they called Ix Tab, would bring them.

Beyond this description, there is only a very brief and somewhat obscure mention of Ix Tab in the Book of Chilam Balam of Tizimin and in the Pérez Codex, in a context of chaos, suffering, and hangings: "They suspended Ix Tab from their hands", or, alternatively, "Ix Tab suspended them from her hands."

== Comparisons ==
Ix Tab is the female form of ah tab, "hangman". The function of Ix Tab as a benevolent "hangwoman" could derive from a basic association with snares. Landa (Tozzer 1941: 155) mentions the hunting deity [Ah] Tabay ("Ensnarer" or "Deceiver"), possibly a patron of hunting with snares, including such that hoist the prey into the air. Animals hoisted by such snares are found depicted in the Dresden and Madrid Codices, the Madrid Codex (MC45c) personifying one of those traps by a male hunting deity. Ix Tab could be understood as a specialized, female form of such a deity, luring the human quarry into the hanging rope personified by her. Suicides freely putting their heads into the "snare" (prompted perhaps by a dream) could then be seen to consecrate themselves to her. On the other hand, the Xtabay of contemporary folklore is a seductive female demon "ensnaring" or "deceiving" her male human preys to madden and destroy them.

== Dresden Codex ==
The Dresden Codex picture (DC53b) of a dead woman with a rope around the neck, suspended from a celestial bar, is often, and without further proof, taken to represent Ix Tab. However, since the picture occurs in a section devoted to eclipses of sun and moon, it may rather have been used to symbolize a lunar eclipse and its dire consequences for women or the Moon Goddess.

== As a possible fabrication ==
It has been claimed that the pre-Spanish Maya did not have a suicide goddess or a significant narrative of suicide by hanging. Originally, Ix Tab may only have been a hunting goddess (see above, Comparisons). Today, the sensationalist idea of a "cult of Ix Tab" appears to be invoked by popular Yucatecan media to portray suicide as an indigenous problem, given that Yucatán has a suicide rate more than twice that of Mexico at large. The inflammatory language goes as far back as Diego de Landa, whose account made it seem like seem like a rampant issue amongst the Maya population.

== See also ==
- Death deity
- Fakelore
- Religious views on suicide

== Bibliography ==
- Ciudad Real, Antonio de, Calepino maya de Motul. Edited by René Acuña. Plaza y Valdés 2001.
- Reyes-Foster, Beatriz M., and Rachael Kangas, “Unraveling Ix Tab: Revisiting the “Suicide Goddess” in Maya Archaeology”. Ethnohistory 63-1 (2016):1-27.
- J.E.S. Thompson, Maya History and Religion. University of Oklahoma Press, Norman 1970.
- J.E.S. Thompson, A Commentary on the Dresden Codex. American Philosophical Society, Philadelphia 1972.
- Alfred M. Tozzer, Landa's Relación de las cosas de Yucatán. A Translation. Peabody Museum, Cambridge MA 1941.
