= Ixik Kab/Sak Ixik =

Mayan deity

- Goddess of the Earth and weaving, possibly love, beauty, copulation
- Member of Creator deities
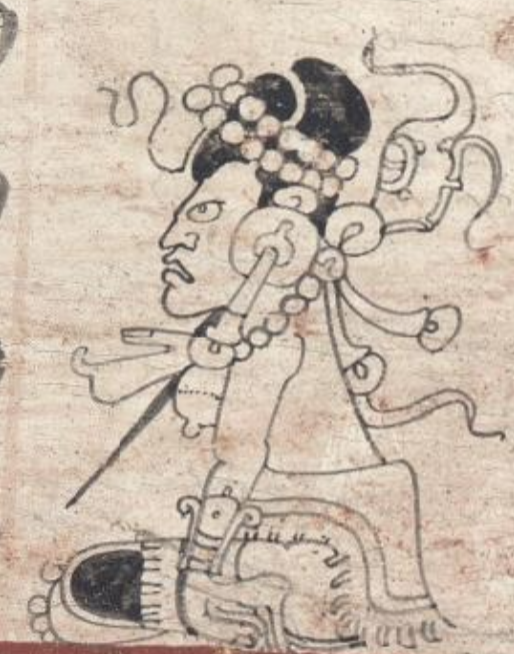
- Age: Young deity
- Gender: Female

Equivalents
- Aztec: Xochiquetzal?

Sak Ixik/Ixik Kab, also known as Goddess I in Taube's updated Schellhas-Zimmermann letter designation, was an important deity for the ancient Maya. She is mainly attested to in the Dresden Codex and represented as a youthful woman Based on her representation in codical almanacs, she is considered to represent vital functions of the fertile woman, and to preside over eroticism, human procreation, and marriage. Her aged form (also shown in the codex) is associated with weaving. In a general sense, her age and domain as a earth and perhaps as a honey goddess could relate her to Xochiquetzal, the beauty, love and flower goddess of the Aztecs.

== Name and attributive value ==
The hieroglyphical name of the goddess consists of a female head characterized by a hair-like curl (prefixed or infixed). The curl is not unimportant, since it is usually assumed to be the sign of the earth (kabʼ[an]) or the moon (Landa's u-sign), with the goddess being identified accordingly. However, the curl might, perhaps, better be viewed as the Postclassic rendition of the infix and hair curl characteristic of Classic glyphs for 'woman' (ixik). If taking the curl to be representative of kab the goddesses name could be read as Lady Earth or Lady Honey (as kab may mean either word). The other name she appears under is preceded by the glyph for 'white' (sak). This could allow for a possible translation of Sak Ixik as "White Woman". The figure of Ixik Kab/Sak Ixik shows a restricted set of variable attributes, amongst which is also the coiled snake headband of Ix Chel (Goddess O). Otherwise, her regal hair and instances of hair trailing behind her back speak to her position as young goddess.

== Functions in ancient almanacs ==
Goddess I is the subject of almanacs which take up several pages in the Post-Classic codices of Dresden (16–23) and Madrid (91–95). There, she is chiefly represented in the following ways:

- Carrying a bird on the shoulders:

The bird species have been argued to refer to the names of specific diseases mentioned in early-colonial medical treatises (especially the Ritual of the Bacabs). Sak Ixik/Ixik Kab thereby may function as a general goddess of disease or of omens.

- Carrying a deity or a symbol in a carrying-strap on her back:

The deity (e.g., the rain god, the death god) or the symbol (e.g., 'abundance') contains a general prognostication.

- Holding a deity as a child on her lap:

The deity so held may contain a prediction relative to the child's development.

- Seated opposite another deity or animal or on the lap of another deity:

The combinations with a deity or an animal (vulture, armadillo, deer, dog) seem to refer to the prospects of marriage, in the Madrid codex symbolized by the reed mat on which the couples have been placed. The deity or the animal may be indicative of certain qualities of the male partner in marriage, with the female partner representing the constant element. In some cases - involving a young deity as well as the old, lecherous God N - the coupling has unmistakably erotic overtones. Ixik Kab/Sak Ixik appears appears sitting on a deity's lap only once, and involves the aged God L. The prognostication may conceivably refer to the sort of husband that can be expected to take and marry the woman, or to the deity's influence on the female partner in marriage. Generally speaking Ixik Kab's proximity to male deities may indicate her place as a goddess of love and marriage or perhaps copulation specifically.

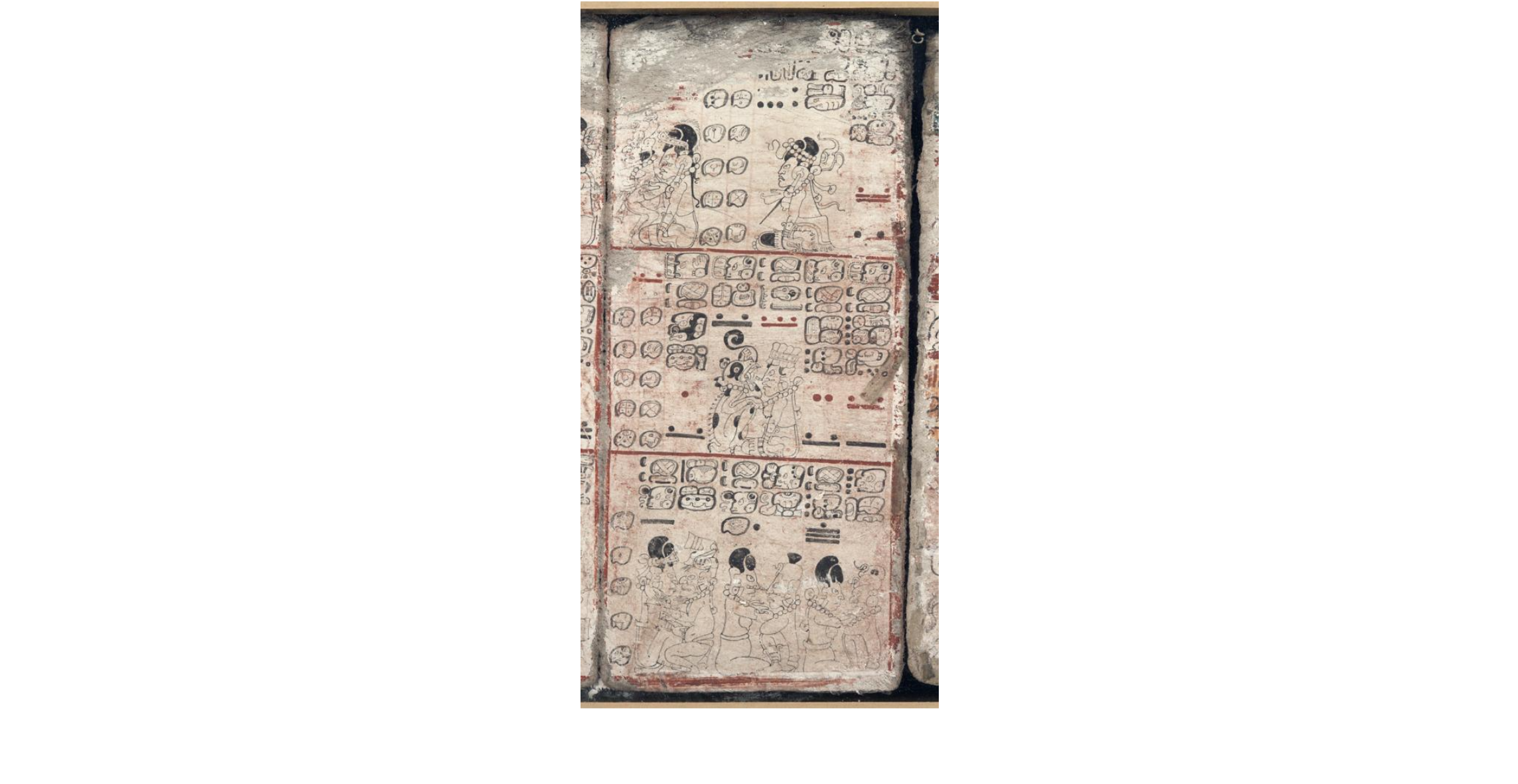
Sak Ixik/Ixik Kab shown performing her many duties on Dresden Codex 21.

== Mythological comparisons ==
Mythologically, she has been compared to the first wife of Hun Hunahpu, Xbaquiyalo, in the 16th century Popol Vuh, although this character only plays a small role in the narrative. This identification would imply that the Howler Monkey Gods, Hun B'atz and Hun Chouen are sons of the goddess. Bassie-Sweet has pointed out that other modern Maya myths, involving a supreme mountain deity— involve a young daughter of the goddess that may serve as a parallel. The themes of eroticism, fertility, and marriage strongly come to the fore in these narratives.

== See also ==
- List of Maya deities
- List of earth deities
- List of love and lust deities
