= Suicide by hanging =

Suicide method

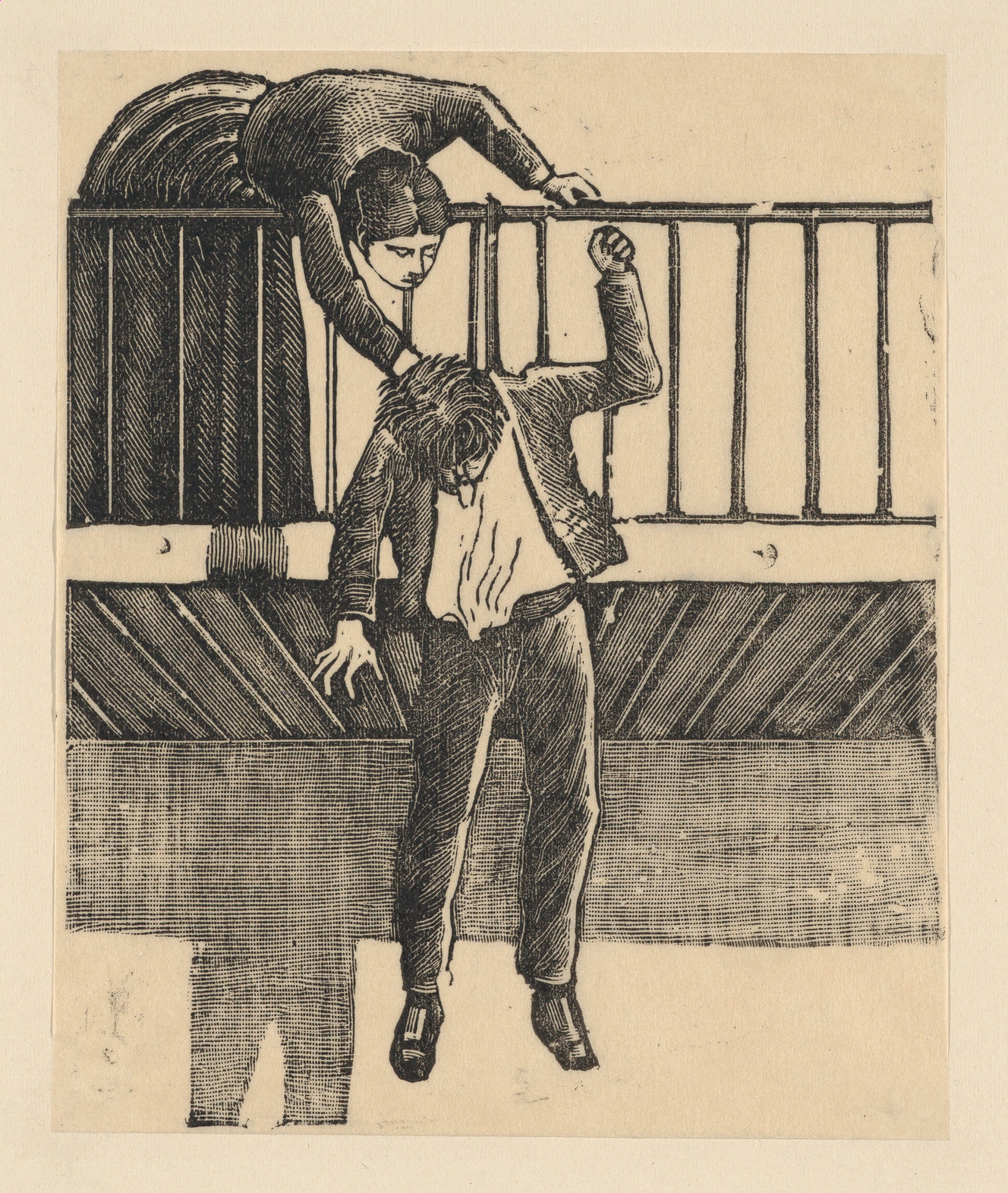
An early 20th century engraving depicting a woman discovering a suicide by hanging

Hanging is a common method of suicide in which a person strangles themselves with a rope or other material, which leads to asphyxiation and death. It is one of the most commonly used suicide methods and has a high mortality rate; Gunnell et al. gives a figure of at least 70 percent. The materials required are easily available, making it a difficult method to prevent. However, a study of people who attempted suicide by hanging and lived suggests that many people overestimate its simplicity and ease. In the International Statistical Classification of Diseases and Related Health Problems, suicides by hanging are classified under the code X70: "Intentional self-harm by hanging, strangulation, and suffocation."

Hanging is divided into suspension hanging and the much rarer drop hanging—the latter can kill in various ways. People who survive either because the cord or its anchor point of attachment breaks, or because they are discovered and cut down, can face a range of serious injuries, including cerebral anoxia (which can lead to permanent brain damage), laryngeal fracture, cervical fracture, tracheal fracture, pharyngeal laceration, and carotid artery injury. Ron M. Brown writes that hanging has a "fairly imperspicuous and complicated symbolic history". There are commentaries on hanging in antiquity, and it has various cultural interpretations. Throughout history, numerous famous people have died due to suicide by hanging.

== Medical effects and treatment ==
People who survive hanging report seeing flashing lights and hearing ringing sounds. The necks of people who are hanged are usually marked with furrows where the ligature had constricted the neck. An inverted V mark is also often seen. Because of the pressure on the jaw, the tongue is sometimes protruding, causing it to dry. Depending on the circumstances, petechiae may be present on the eyes, face, legs, and feet. Cervical fractures of the spine are rare unless the hanging is a drop hanging, which usually causes an injury known as hangman's fracture. Suspension hanging usually results in cerebral hypoxia and decreased muscle tone around the neck. According to Aufderheide et al., the most common cause of death of hangings is cerebral hypoxia.

Most people who are hanged die before they are found; the term "near hanging" refers to those who survive (at least for a while—for example, until they reach a hospital). Initial treatment of survivors follows the "usual priorities of airway, breathing, and circulation (ABC)". Treatment should be "directed at airway control with endotracheal intubation, ventilation using positive end expiratory pressure (PEEP), and hyperventilation with supplemental oxygen to control intracranial pressure". One study of people who experienced near-hanging who were treated appropriately at a hospital found that 77 percent of them survived.

== Prevalence ==
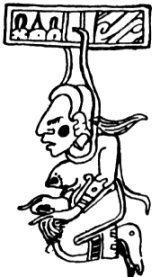
Ixtab (Rope Woman), the ancient Maya goddess of suicide by hanging. Under certain circumstances, suicide was considered an honorable way to die and Ixtab would act as a psychopomp for these individuals.

According to Anton J. L. van Hooff, hanging was the most common suicide method in primitive and pre-industrial societies. A 2008 review of 56 countries based on World Health Organization mortality data found that hanging was the most common method in most of the countries, accounting for 53 percent of the male suicides and 39 percent of the female suicides.

In England and Wales, hanging is the most commonly used method, and is particularly prevalent in the group of males aged 15–44, comprising almost half of the suicides in the group. It is the second most common method among women, behind poisoning. In 1981 hanging accounted for 23.5 percent of male suicides, and by 2001 the figure had risen to 44.2 percent. The proportion of hangings as suicides in 2005 among females aged 15–34 was 47.2 percent, having risen from 5.7 percent in 1968. In the United States it is the second most common method, behind firearms, and is by far the most common method for those in psychiatric wards and hospitals. Hanging accounts for a greater percentage of suicides among younger Americans than among older ones. Differences exist among ethnic groups; research suggests that hanging is the most common method among Chinese and Japanese Americans. Hanging is also a frequently used method for those in custody, in several countries.

== Related elements ==
Homicides may be disguised as a hanging suicide. Features that suggest that the death is a homicide include the ligature marks being under the larynx, scratch marks on the ligature, and the presence of significant injury on the skin of the neck.

== Cultural aspects ==
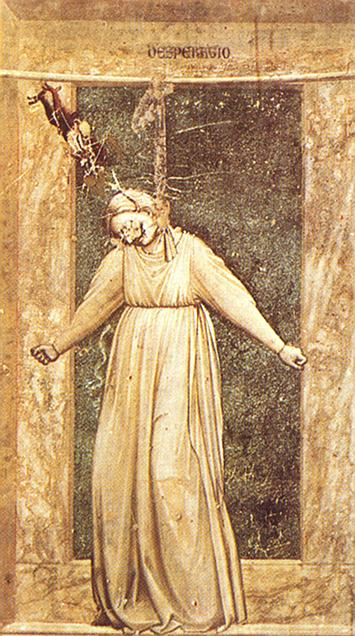
Painting by Giotto depicting a person committing the sin of desperatio, the rejection of God's mercy, because while choked they are unable to ask for repentance

Historically, countries that have had a recent history of using hanging as a method of capital punishment tend to have a low rate of hanging suicides, which may be because such suicides were regarded as shameful, according to Farmer and Rodhe. Hanging, with its connection to justice and injustice, is what the Department of Health and Aged Care of Australia calls a "particularly confronting display of resistance, defiance, individual control and accusatory blame"; it is "a rebuke and statement of uncaring relations, unmet needs, personal anguish, and emotional payback". A 2010 study by the British Journal of Psychiatry that investigated the motivations of people who had made a near-fatal suicide attempt found that those who had attempted a hanging considered it a painless, quick, simple, and clean method, while those who had opted for a different method held an opposing view.

=== China ===
There is a popular belief in Chinese culture that the spirits of those who killed themselves by hanging will haunt and torment the survivors, because they had died in rage and with feelings of hostility and anger. Angry and oppressed women would use this method as an act of revenge. Lee & Kleinman write that hanging, the most common method in traditional China, was the "final, but unequivocal, way of standing still against and above oppressive authorities, often with the suicide ceremonially dressed prior to the ultimate act".

=== Ancient Rome ===
In ancient Rome, death by hanging—suicide or otherwise—was regarded as particularly shameful, and those who had died by this method were refused a burial. Virgil's Aeneid, for example, refers to the noose as nodum informis leti ("the coil of unbecoming death"). Timothy Hill writes that there is no conclusive explanation of why the stigma existed; it has been suggested that hanging was a method of the poor. The Greeks considered hanging as a woman's death because many women had died by this method. A study found that, in literary sources, 1.5–10 percent and 30 percent of suicides in the Roman and Greek civilizations, respectively, were by hanging.

=== Australia ===
Suicide by hanging is particularly common among Indigenous Australians, who have a high suicide rate, especially among young men. Ernest Hunter and Desley Harvey suggest that hanging accounts for two-thirds of indigenous suicides. Hanging has deep symbolic meanings in Indigenous Australian culture, beyond those attached to the act generally. Hanging appears in indigenous art, film, music, and literature. There are reports of voices encouraging people to kill themselves, and of ghostly figures holding a noose, but saying nothing.

== See also ==
- Ixtab – Yucatec Maya goddess of suicide
- List of suicide crisis lines
- Suicide prevention – Efforts to reduce the risk of suicide
