= Huracan =

Maya deity of wind, storm and fire

Huracán (/ˈhʊrəkən, ˈhʊrəkɑːn/; Spanish: Huracán; Mayan languages: Hunraqan, "one legged"), often referred to as U Kʼux Kaj, the "Heart of Sky", is a Kʼicheʼ Maya god of wind, storm, fire and one of the creator deities who participated in all three attempts at creating humanity. He also caused the Great Flood after the second generation of humans angered the gods. He supposedly lived in the windy mists above the floodwaters and repeatedly invoked "earth" until land came up from the seas.

His name, understood as 'One-Leg', suggests god K of Postclassic and Classic Maya iconography, a deity of lightning with one human leg, and one leg shaped like a serpent. God K is commonly referred to as Bolon Tzacab or Kʼawiil and was a god associated with power, creation, and lightning. The name may ultimately derive from huracan, a Carib word, and the source of the words hurricane and orcan (European windstorm).

Related deities are Tohil in Kʼiche mythology, Bolon Tzacab in Yucatec mythology, Cocijo in Zapotec mythology, and Tezcatlipoca in Aztec mythology.

== See also ==
- Juracán
- Chaac
