= Chumayel Municipality =

Municipality in the Mexican state of Yucatán

Chumayel
- Municipality
- Region 7 Sur #024

- Location of the Municipality in Mexico Chumayel (Yucatán (state))
- Coordinates: 20°25′42″N 89°18′04″W
- Country: Mexico
- State: Yucatán
- Mexico Ind.: 1821
- Yucatán Est.: 1824

Government
  - Type: 2012–2015
  - Municipal President: Mariza Jazmín Itzá Briceño

Area
  - Total: 45.99 km^{2} (17.76 sq mi)
- Elevation: 25 m (82 ft)

Population (2010)
  - Total: 3,148
  - Density: 68.45/km^{2} (177.3/sq mi)
  - Demonym: Umanense
- Time zone: UTC-6 (Central Standard Time)
- INEGI Code: 024
- Major Airport: Merida (Manuel Crescencio Rejón) International Airport
- IATA Code: MID
- ICAO Code: MMMD

Chumayel Municipality (In the Yucatec Maya Language: “place of seeds") is a municipality in the Mexican state of Yucatán containing 45.99 km^{2} of land and is located roughly 80 km southeast of the city of Mérida.

== History ==
There is no accurate data on when the town was founded, though it existed before the conquest. At colonization, Chumayel became part of the encomienda system. The town's ancient history is important; one of the few remaining Mayan documents, the Codices of the Chilam Balam of Chumayel, originated here.

Yucatán declared its independence from the Spanish Crown in 1821, and in 1825 the area was assigned to the lower mountainous partition of Mama Municipality. In 1867 it was moved to the Tekax Municipality and in 1935 it was designated as its own municipality.

== Governance ==
The municipal president is elected for a three-year term. The town council has four councilpersons, who serve as Secretary and councilors of public security, public lighting and nomenclature.

The Municipal Council administers the business of the municipality. It is responsible for budgeting and expenditures and producing all required reports for all branches of the municipal administration. Annually it determines educational standards for schools.

The Police Commissioners ensure public order and safety. They are tasked with enforcing regulations, distributing materials and administering rulings of general compliance issued by the council.

== Communities ==
The head of the municipality is Chumayel, Yucatán. There are 5 populated areas of the municipality. The significant populations are shown below:

Community	Population
Entire Municipality (2010)	3,148
Chumayel	2924 in 2005

== Local festivals ==
Every year from 28 April to 3 May the traditional town feast, Holy Christ's Transfiguration, is celebrated.

== Tourist attractions ==
- Church of the Immaculate Conception built in the 16th century
- Hacienda Ucum
