= Ek Chuah =

Maya patron deity of cacao

- patron god of Cocoa, journeys, merchants, and travelers
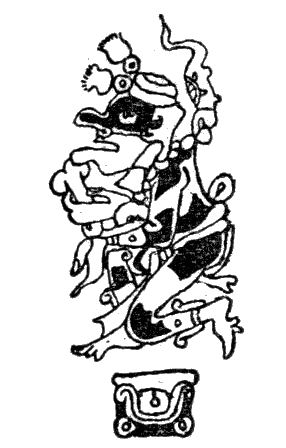
- Ek Chuah, patron deity of cacao, as depicted in the Dresden Codex
- Other names: Ek Chuaj, God M
- Gender: Male

Equivalents
- Christian: Saint Christopher
- Greek: Hermes
- Norse: Meili
- Roman: Mercury

Ek Chuah, also transliterated as Ek Chuaj and known as God M in the Schellhas-Zimmermann-Taube classification of codical gods, is a Postclassic Maya merchant deity and patron deity of cacao. Ek Chuah is part of a pantheon of Maya deities that have been depicted in hieroglyphs and artwork of various Maya sites and has been interpreted as a significant part of Maya religion.

== Description ==
Ek Chuah can either be depicted as black-and-white striped, as he is in the Dresden Codex, or entirely black, as he is in the Madrid Codex. Other distinguishing characteristics of Ek Chuah are his mouth, which is encircled by a red-brown border, his large lower lip, and the presence of two curved lines to the right of his eye. Other depictions of Ek Chuah show him as an old man with only a single tooth. This is the appearance he most regularly takes in the Madrid Codex. He has been depicted with a pack of goods commonly carried by merchants, and his carrying of a burden is also indicated by the rope or tumpline tied around his head. He may also carry a spear and, in some instances, a scorpion's tail.

== Significance ==
Ek Chuah holds various meanings depending upon the contexts in which he is depicted. His principal associations are with trade and cacao use.

=== As a merchant deity ===
Ek Chuah is often depicted carrying a pack and a spear, indicating transportation of goods as well as the dangerous life of a merchant. In this context, Ek Chuah is a patron deity of travelers and journeys. During journeys, travelers would stack three stones on top of each other and offer incense to Ek Chuah at night to ensure a safe journey home. It is possible that Ek Chuah and the "Guide of the Merchant," otherwise known as Polaris or the North Star, are related both symbolically and linguistically. "Ek" can be translated as either "black" or "star".

=== As a patron deity of cacao ===
Cacao was one of the most important products traded by Maya merchants, and it was often treated as currency. Because Ek Chuah is a patron of cacao, owners of cacao groves would hold ceremonies or special festivals in his honor. One of these was held during Muwan, a month in the haabʼ or Maya solar calendar. The presence of this ceremony suggests that Ek Chuah was an agriculturally symbolic deity within Maya society.

== Interactions with other deities ==
Ek Chuah is sometimes depicted in combat, most often with Buluk Chabtan (God F) the god of war, violence, and sacrifice. This interaction has been interpreted as representing the need for traveling merchants to have the ability to ward off hostile attacks. In the Madrid Codex, Ek Chuah and God L are closely related and sometimes nearly indistinguishable from one another. It appears that God L was a Classic Maya counterpart of Ek Chuah. As Ek Chuah gained influence and importance, he supplanted God L. In some cases, Ek Chuah seems have attributes of other deities. For example, in one instance he is depicted with the head of an old man, the spine of a death god, and the tail of a scorpion.

== Names ==
- Ek Chuah
- Ek Chuaj
- God M
- Black Scorpion (In Postclassic codices)
