= Chin (deity) =

Mayan god

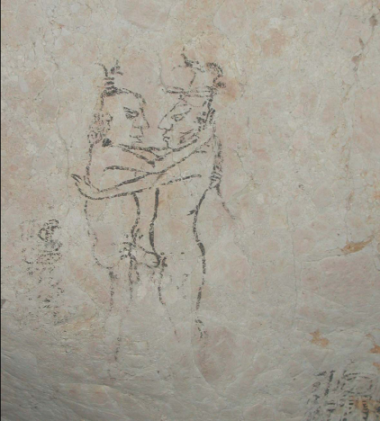
Ithyphallic creature embracing nobleman, Naj Tunich cave

Chin, together with Cu, Cavil (glossed as 'idol,' likely referring to K'awiil), and Maran, is mentioned as the name of the male deity said to have demonstrated sexual intercourse with other male deities and humans.

In describing the customs of the Mayas inhabiting the Verapaz province (including the Alta Verapaz and Baja Verapaz) of 16th-century Guatemala, Bishop Bartolomé de las Casas mentions sexual relationships, regulated by customary law, between unmarried young men and boys, as well as similar relations prevailing among adolescents receiving instruction in the temples. Chin is said to have demonstrated sexual intercourse with another 'demon', and thereby to have introduced such relationships. De las Casas writes "From that time on some fathers gave their sons a little boy to be used as a woman; and if someone else took the boy, they demanded pay as is done when someone violates another's wife." Institutionalized pederastic prostitution, including transvestism, is recorded in 17th-century Spanish reports of the Itzá Mayas living in the Petén.

Among the Classic Period scenes found in a cave of Naj Tunich is a depiction of a naked, sexually excited male embracing a nude Maya nobleman, possibly by way of initiation.
