= ACAT1 mRNA =

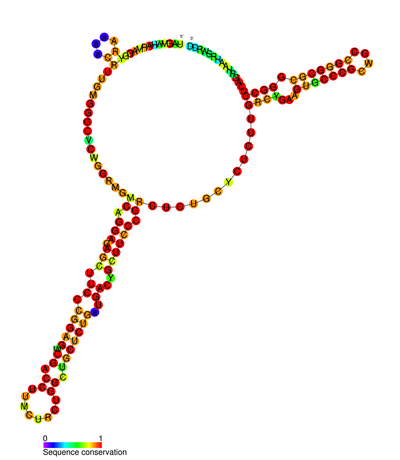
- Conserved secondary structure of ACAT1 mRNA

Identifiers
- Symbol: ACAT1
- Rfam: RF01495

Other data
- GO: 0006446
- SO: 0005836
- PDB structures: PDBe

Human acetyl-coA cholesterol acyltransferase (ACAT1) gene produces a chimeric mRNA through the interchromosomal processing of two discontinuous RNAs transcribed from chromosomes 1 and 7. This chimeric mRNA uses AUG as a translation initiation codon to produce the normal 50-kDa ACAT1 protein but used an alternative translation initiation codon, GGC, to produce the novel enzymatically active 56-kDa isoform.

Mutagenesis and mass spectrometry identified the alternative initiation codon as the start codon for the novel 56-kDa protein and its location was mapped to a region located upstream of the AUG initiation codon. Three stem loop structures have been predicted to surround the GCC initiation codon and are known as SL1 to SL3. Mutations that disrupted these stem-loop structures showed that SL1 and SL2 as required for translation initiation from the GGC codon but SL3 has no effect on translation efficiency. Translation initiation from the GGC codon was shown to be is mediated by an internal ribosome entry site (IRES) which requires SL1 located upstream of the IRES and SL2 located downstream. This study also showed that SL3 influences the choice of downstream AUG translation initiation codons that will produce the normal 50-KDa human ACAT1 protein.
