= Acat (deity) =

Mayan deity associated with tattooing

Acat was a deity in Maya mythology associated with the process of tattooing. The Maya placed great importance on the tattooing process, believing that tattoos in the image of a god would imbue a person with some of that god's power. Because of the importance and difficulty of this art form it was natural that this god would be prominent among the Maya. Acat was said to bless the ink, needles, and work spaces, and steady the hands of the artists for better results.

Acat was first mentioned by J. Eric S. Thompson, in his book "Tattooing and Scarification among the Maya." (Carnegie Institution of Washington Division of Historical Research, June 18th, 1946.) Thompson also added that Acat is a Nahuatl day name meaning "reed", while the pronunciation "Ah Cat" would be "He of the Storage Jar." Most likely because hollow reeds were thought to be used in the tattooing process.

In addition, Thompson writes (in relation to the designation of the deity's name) "Acat is translated as 'inkstand' in the Pio Perez dictionary; as a doctor's instrument case or a scribe's pen case in the Motul dictionary.” Loosely, Acat as a deity is also associated with the development of the fetus in the womb.
