= Chaac =

Maya god of rain, thunder, and lightning

- God of lightning, rain, and thunder
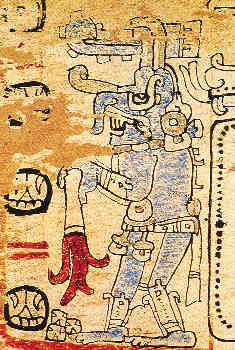
- Chaac represented in the Madrid Codex
- Other names: Chac, Chaahk
- Gender: Male
- Consort: Itzamna

Equivalents
- Aztec: Tlaloc

Chaac (also spelled Chac or, in Classic Mayan, Chaahk [t͡ʃaːhk]) is the name of the Maya god of rain and abundance. With his lightning axe, Chaac was believed to strike the clouds, causing them to produce thunder and rain. Chaac corresponds to Tlaloc among the Aztecs and Cocijo among the Zapotecs.

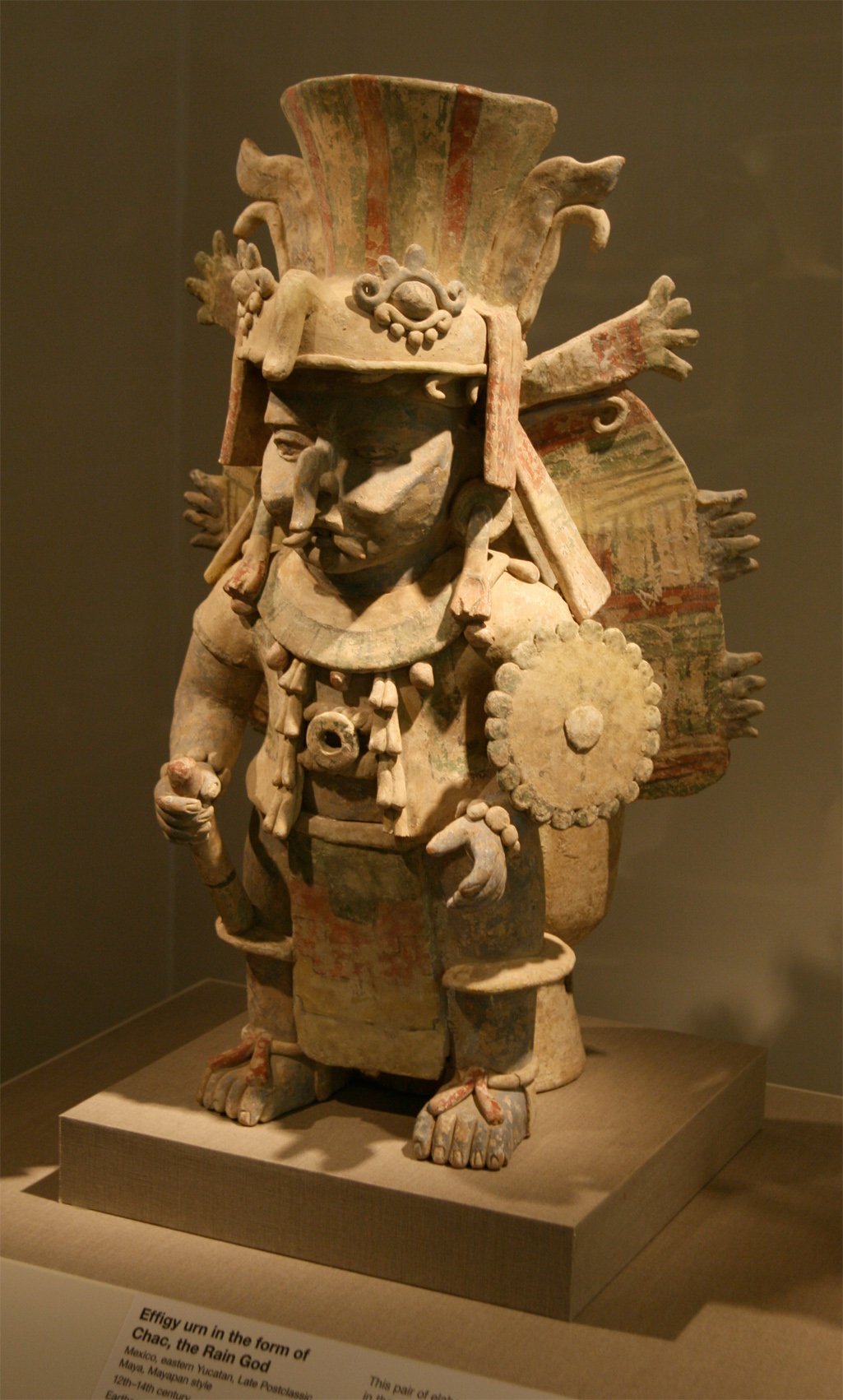
Earthenware effigy urn (an incense burner) of Chaac, 12th–14th century

== Rain deities and rain makers ==
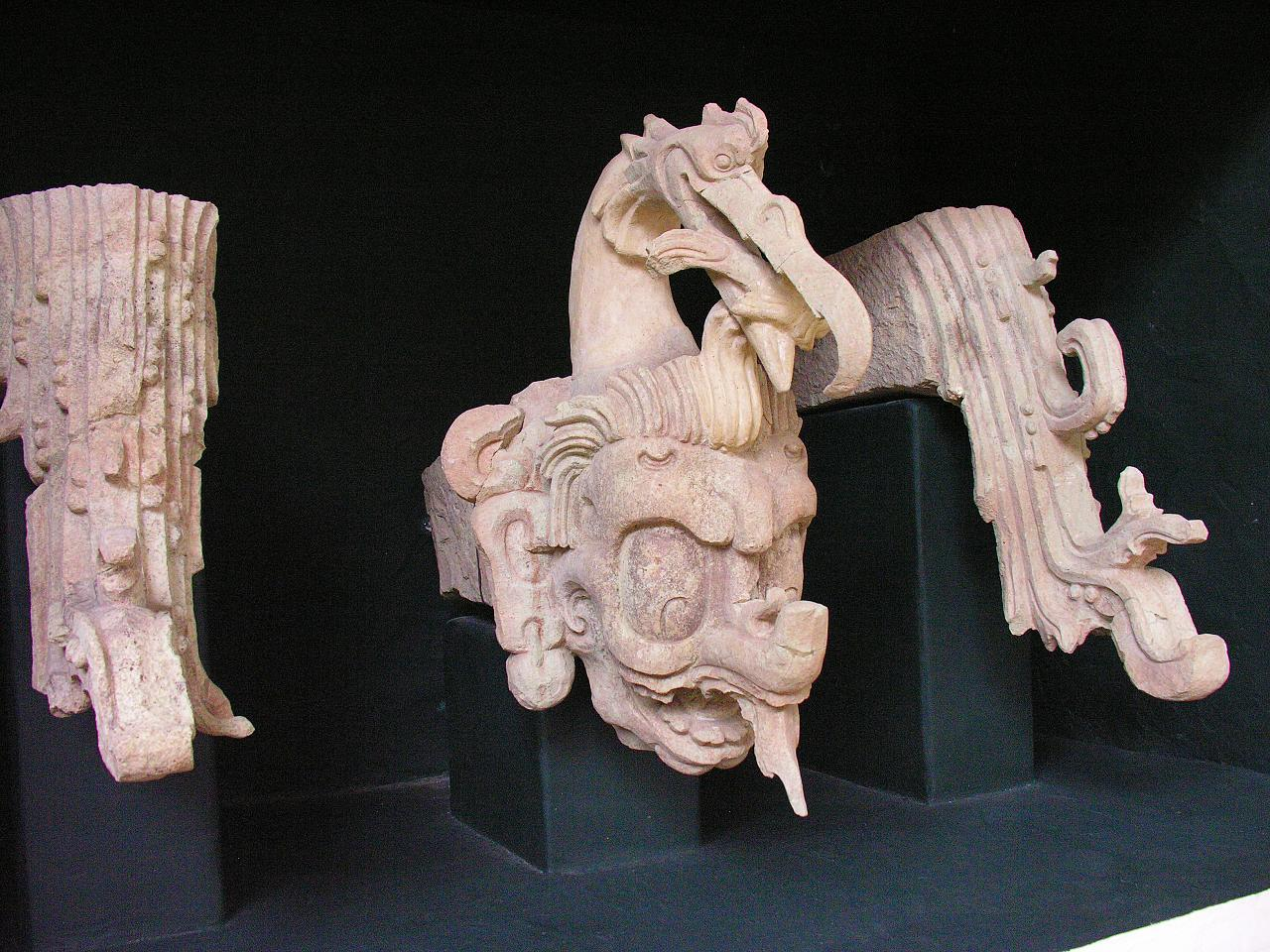
Chaac sculpture at the Maya Sculpture Museum, Honduras.

Like other Maya gods, Chaac is both one and manifold. Four Chaacs are based in the cardinal directions and wear the directional colors. East, where the sunrise is, is red, North, mid-day zenith, is represented by white, West is represented by black for the sunset, and South is represented by yellow. There is a fifth color which is associated with the center point, and that is green. In 16th-century Yucatán, the directional Chaac of the east was called Chac Xib Chaac 'Red Man Chaac', only the colors being varied for the three other ones.

Contemporary Yucatec Maya farmers distinguish many more aspects of the rainfall and the clouds and personify them as different, hierarchically-ordered rain deities. The Chorti Maya have preserved important folklore regarding the process of rain-making, which involved rain deities striking rain-carrying snakes with their axes.

The rain deities had their human counterparts. In the traditional Maya (and Mesoamerican) community, one of the most important functions was that of rainmaker, which presupposed an intimate acquaintance with (and thus, initiation by) the rain deities, and a knowledge of their places and movements. According to a Late-Postclassic Yucatec tradition, Chac Xib Chaac (the rain deity of the east) was the title of a king of Chichen Itza, and similar titles were bestowed upon Classic rulers as well (see below).

== Rain rituals ==
Among the rituals for the rain deities, the Yucatec Chʼa Cháak ceremony for asking rain centers on a ceremonial banquet for the rain deities. It includes four boys (one for each cardinal point) acting and chanting as frogs. Asking for rain and crops was also the purpose of 16th-century rituals at the cenotes, of Yucatán.

The ocellated turkey (yuum kuuts) is associated with the deity; one is yearly hunted and sacrificed to obtain its blood to be offered to fields in hopes of a good harvest.

== Mythology ==
The rain deity is a patron of agriculture. A well-known myth involving the Chaacs (or related rain and lightning deities) is about the opening of the mountain where the maize was hidden. In Tzotzil mythology, the rain deity also figures as the father of nubile women representing maize and vegetables. In some versions of the Qʼeqchiʼ myth of Sun and Moon, the rain deity Choc (or Chocl) 'Cloud' is the brother of Sun; together they defeat their aged adoptive mother and her lover. Later, Chaac commits adultery with his brother's wife and is duly punished; his tears of agony give origin to the rain. Versions of this myth show the rain deity Chac in his war-like fury, pursuing the fleeing Sun and Moon, and attacking them with his lightning bolts.

In some mythologies, it is believed that water and clouds are formed within the Earth in caves and cenotes and then carried into the sky by deities such as Chaac. Classic period Maya sources also suggest that Chaac was the god who opened the mountain containing maize, using his lightning axe, K'awiil.

== Iconography ==
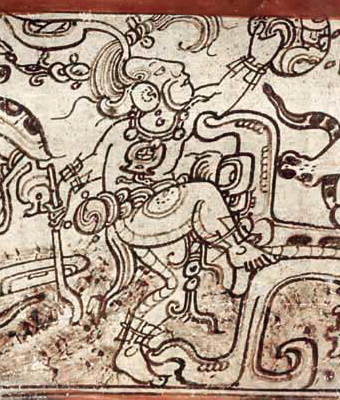
Rain deity impersonator, Classic period

Chaac is usually depicted with a human body showing reptilian or amphibian scales, and with a non-human head evincing fangs and a long, pendulous nose. In the Classic style, a shell serves as his ear ornament. He often carries a shield and a lightning axe, the axe being personified by a closely related deity, K'awiil, called Bolon Dzacab in Yucatec. The Classic Chaac sometimes shows features of the Central Mexican (Teotihuacan) precursor of Tlaloc.

=== Rain ===
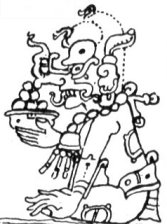
reconstructed image of Chac, from the Dresden Codex, Art by unidentified pre-Columbian Maya scribe before C.E.1500.

A large part of one of the four surviving Maya codices, the Dresden Codex, is dedicated to the Chaacs, their locations, and activities. It illustrates the intimate relationship existing between the Chaacs, the Bacabs, and the aged goddess, Ixchel. The main source on the 16th-century Yucatec Maya, Bishop Diego de Landa, combines the four Chaacs with the four Bacabs and Pauahtuns into one concept. The Bacabs were aged deities governing the subterranean sphere and its water supplies.

=== Warfare ===
In the Classic period, the king often impersonated the rain deity (or an associated rain serpent) while a portrait glyph of the rain deity can accompany the king's other names. This may have given expression to his role as a supreme rain-maker. Typically, however, it is the war-like fury of the rain deity that receives emphasis (as is also the case in the myth mentioned above). The king personifying the rain deity is then shown carrying war implements and making prisoners, while his actions seem to be equated with the violence of a thunderstorm.

=== Classic period narrative ===
About Chaahk's role in Classic period mythological narrative, little is known. He is present at the resurrection of the Maya maize god from the carapace of a turtle, possibly representing the earth. The so-called 'confrontation scenes' are of a more legendary nature. They show a young nobleman and his retinue wading through the waters and being approached by warriors. One of these warriors is a man personifying the rain deity. He probably represents an ancestral king, and seems to be referred to as Chak Xib [Chaahk]. Together with the skeletal Death God (God A), Chaahk also appears to preside over an initiate's ritual transformation into a jaguar.

== In modern times ==
Chaac continues to hold importance for some Maya groups in Mexico. In 2024, a statue of the Greek god Poseidon located in Progreso, Yucatán, caused controversy for locals who deemed it offensive to their beliefs in Chaac. Many locals organized with the goal of destroying the statue because it supposedly angered Chaac. While the movement originated as a joke, many took it seriously and attempted to vandalize the statue. Activist lawyers sought to have the statue removed, and some people in Mexico cited Tropical Storm Alberto and Hurricane Beryl as proof that Chaac was upset at Poseidon.

== See also ==
- Aktzin
- Chac: Dios de la lluvia (1975), a film made with Maya actors.
- Yopaat, a closely related southern Maya storm god
