= Kʼawiil =

Maya deity

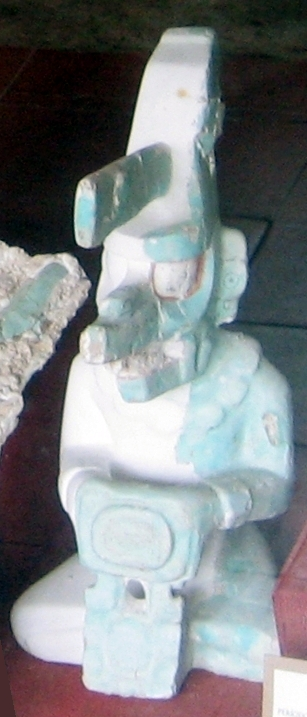
Kʼawiil effigy cast from Tikal

Kʼawiil, in the Post-Classic codices corresponding to God K, is a Maya deity identified with power, creation, and lightning. He is characterized by a zoomorphic head, with large eyes, long, upturned snout and attenuated serpent foot. As a creator god, K'awiil usually has a torch, stone celt, or cigar coming out of his forehead that symbolizes the spark of life. One of his legs does not end in a foot but in a snake with an open mouth, from which another being can emerge. As lightning and power personified, K'awiil is often carried like an axe by rain gods or as a scepter by Maya rulers.

== Names ==
From the correspondence between Landa's description of the New Year rituals and the depiction of these rituals in the Dresden Codex, it can be inferred that in 16th-century Yucatán, Kʼawiil was called Bolon Dzacab 'Innumerable (bolon 'nine, innumerable') maternal generations', probably a metaphor for fertility as well as the power of creation. God K's name in the Classic period may have been the same, or similar, since the numeral 'nine' is repeatedly found included in the deity's logogram.

However, based on epigraphic considerations, the Classic Maya God K is now most often referred to as Kʼawiil. Hieroglyphically, the head of God K can substitute for the syllable kʼa in kʼawiil, a word possibly meaning 'powerful one', and attested as a generic deity title in Yucatec documents. This substitution has given rise to the idea that, inversely, the title kʼawiil as a whole should be considered a name specifically referring to God K.

== Narratives and scenes ==
Lightning plays a crucial role in tales dealing with the creation of the world and its preparation for the advent of mankind. In the cosmogony of the Popol Vuh, three Lightning deities identified with the 'Heart of the Sky' (among whom Huraqan 'One-Leg') create the earth out of the primordial sea, and populate it with animals. Bolon Dzacab plays an important, if not very clear role in the cosmogonical myth related in the Book of Chilam Balam of Chumayel, where he is identified with wrapped-up seeds. Wielding lightning, the rain gods once opened up a sacred mountain, making the maize seeds therein available to mankind.

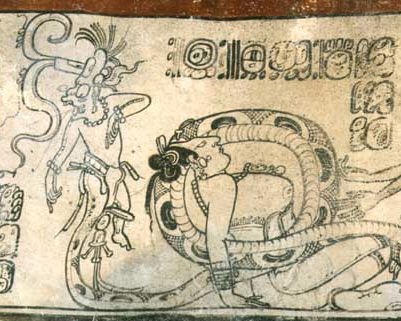
Woman entwined by the serpent leg of Kʼawiil

Kʼawiil also figures in an enigmatic Classic scene known only from ceramics (see fig.2), showing an aged ancestor or deity emerging from the serpentine foot of the lightning god, apparently to mate with a nude young woman of decidedly aristocratic allure entwined by the serpent. Not impossibly, the meaning of the scene is ritual, rather than mythological.

K'awiil also features prominently in the stucco reliefs of the Temple of the Inscriptions at Palenque in Chiapas, Mexico, where rulers and nobles hold infant forms of K'awiil. This infant form of the god (unen k'awiil) was also one of the three patron deities of Palenque (GII of the so-called Palenque Triad).

== Functions ==
The illustrated k'atun cycle of the Paris Codex suggests that the presentation of the head of Kʼawiil – perhaps holding the promise of 'Innumerable Generations' – was part of the king's ritual inauguration and accession to the throne. As lightning, k'awiil was also raw power and basic to creation as well as destruction. Holding k'awiil was a sign not only of the king's abilities in war and politics but also his power to bring agricultural abundance (particularly with regard to maize and cacao seeds). Therefore, k'awiil is often depicted with a sack of grains, sometimes accompanied by the expression hun yax(al) hun kʼan(al) 'abundance'.

== See also ==
- List of Maya gods and supernatural beings
- Jasaw Chan Kʼawiil I
- Maya religion

== Bibliography ==
- Coe, Michael; Mark van Stone (2001). Reading the Maya Glyphs (1st ed.). London: Thames and Hudson. ISBN 0500051100.
- Coe, Michael (2011). The Maya (8th ed.). Thames and Hudson.
- Fitzsimmons, James L. (2024-10-03). "Centuries ago, the Maya storm god Huracán taught that when we damage nature, we damage ourselves". The Conversation. Retrieved 2024-10-06.
- Foster, Lynn V. (2002). Handbook to Life in the Ancient Maya World. Oxford University Press.
- Houston, Stephen D.; David Stuart; Karl Taube (2006). The Memory of Bones: Body, Being, and Experience among the Classic Maya (First ed.). Austin: University of Texas Press.
- Looper, Matthew G. (2009). To be Like Gods: Dance in Ancient Maya Civilisation (Illustrated ed.). Austin: University of Texas Press.
- Miller, Mary Ellen; Karl Taube (1997). The Gods and Symbols of Ancient Mexico and the Maya: an Illustrated Dictionary (1st Paperback ed.). London: Thames and Hudson. ISBN 0500279284.
- Schele, Linda; David A. Freidel; Joy Parker (1993). Maya Cosmos: Three Thousand Years on the Shaman's Path. New York: William Morrow and Company Inc.
- Schele, Linda; David A. Freidel (1990). A Forest of Kings: the Untold Story of the Ancient Maya. New York: Morrow.
- Stone, Andrea; Mark M. Zender (2011). Reading Maya Art: A Hieroglyphic Guide to Ancient Maya Painting and Sculpture. London: Thames and Hudson.
- Taube, Karl A. (1985). "The Classic Maya Maize God: A Reappraisal". Fifth Palenque Round Table, Virginia M. Fields (ed). San Francisco, CA: The Pre-Columbian Art Research Institute. pp. 171–181.
- Taube, Karl A. (1989-01-01). "The Maize Tamale in Classic Maya Diet, Epigraphy, and Art". American Antiquity. 54 (1): 31–51. doi:10.2307/281330. ISSN 0002-7316. JSTOR 281330. S2CID 163274964.
- Thompson, John Eric Sidney (1970). Maya History and Religion. University of Oklahoma Press. ISBN 9780806122472.
