= Maya Moon Goddess =

Mesoamerican moon goddess

- Goddess of the moon and weaving
- Member of Creator deities
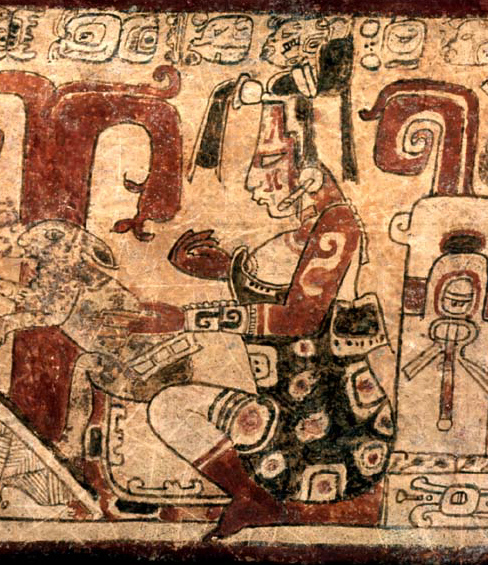
- Abode: Moon, Underworld(?)
- Planet: Moon
- Animals: Rabbit
- Symbol: Crescent moon and rabbit
- Age: Young deity
- Gender: Female

Equivalents
- Chinese: Chang'e
- Aztec: Coyolxauhqui

The Maya Moon Goddess was a major deity for the Classic Maya. She is consistently depicted as a young woman of Maya beauty standard and is often adorned with patterned clothing, jewelry and a floral headdress. She is often represented with the crescent moon and the lunar rabbit. Due to her almost complete absence from codical representation, she was never given a Schellhas lettered designation like Ixik Kab/Sak Ixik (Goddess I) and Ixchel (Goddess O). Like the other Maya goddess, the Moon Goddess also had a secondary default domain in weaving as well as her main office as the lunar deity.

== Name ==
The Moon Goddess' name has been a topic of confusion and lack of consensus in the Mesoamerican scholarly world. As the decipherment of the Mayan hieroglyphs advances, suggestions have been put forth on readings of the lunar goddess' name. One possible reading involves interpreting the head glyph in the goddess' name to mean the numerical value "one" and the moon suffix to simply be read as "moon", making the goddess' name, One Moon (Hun Uh for an untranslated reading using the Yucatec translation for moon). However in scholarship she largely continues to simply be referred to as the Moon Goddess.

== Attributes and representation ==
The Moon Goddess appears almost entirely on Classic Period polychrome ceramics, with some exceptions. The goddess possess a handful of attributes that she can be identified through, primarily the company of the lunar rabbit and the presence of some sort of lunar body, often a crescent. The goddess may also wear a netting skirt, although many representations simply have her adorned in decorated clothing instead.

== Connections with other deities ==
=== Maize God ===
The Maize God has been recorded with the attributes of the Moon Goddess. The Maize God sometimes appears with the "IL" markings on his face, a common convention for depicting Maya women and goddesses. Some confusion regarding the similarity of their depictions led to the theory that they may be representing the same deity or some sort of dual deity. However, their presence as discrete figures in the same ceramic clarified their individuality (see Kerr 5166 picture below).

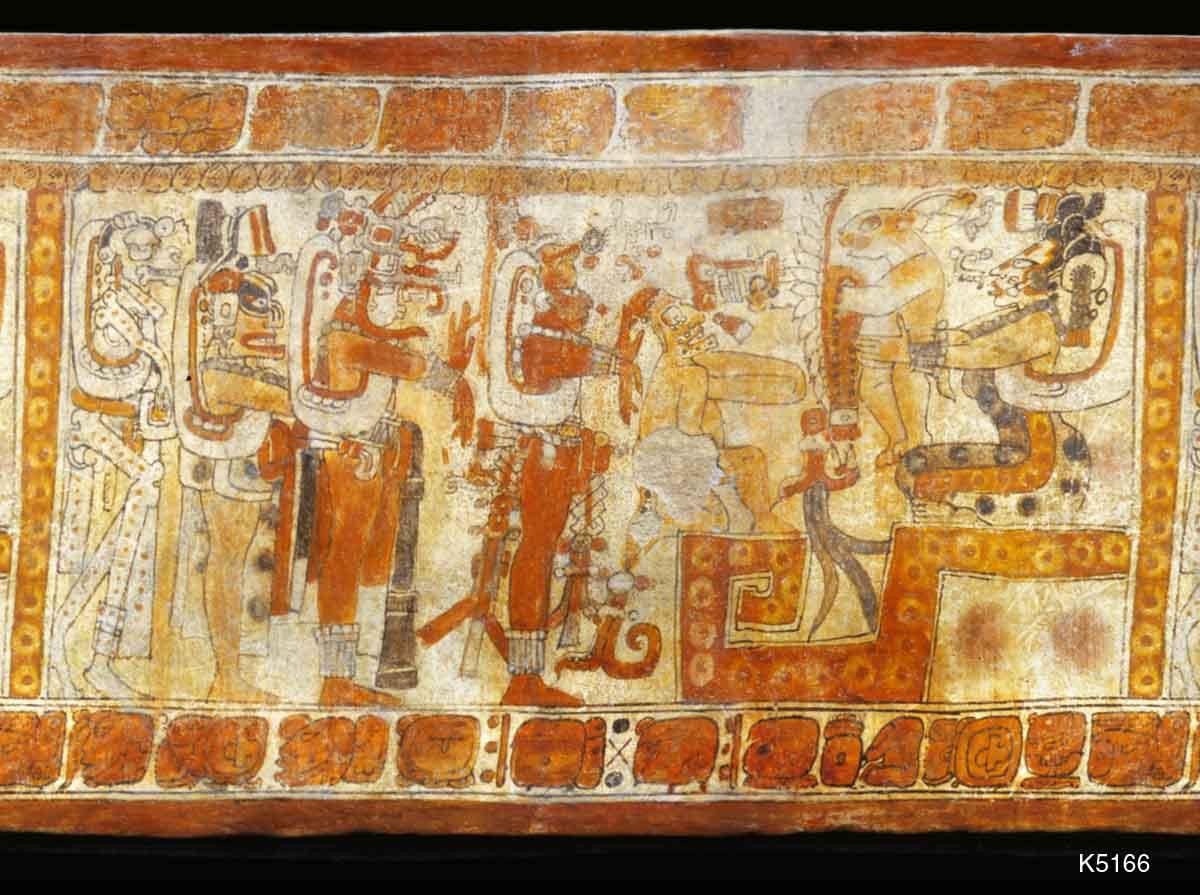
Court of the Moon Goddess. (Pictured from left to right) Skeletal/Death God, Underworld/Jaguar God, Water-Lily Serpent, Maize God, God L, Lunar Rabbit, Moon Goddess

=== Itzamna ===
A possible connection with Itzamna relies interpreting the ceramics such as Kerr 504 (and others like it) as the creator god Itzamna protecting or guarding the Moon Goddess in a fatherly manner, although this interpretation needs further evidence.

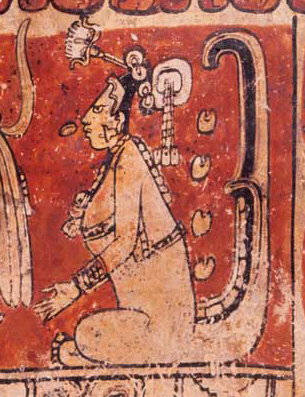
Moon Goddess as she appears in Kerr 504

== In mythology ==
The Moon Goddess and lunar rabbit are known to play a central role in a myth from the Classic period involving the theft of the regalia of God L, an underworld deity. This myth is pictured in scenes such as the one painted on Kerr 5166. The lunar rabbit may represent a trickster character, and the Moon Goddess, his custodian. There is a variant of this myth that instead involves the sun deity, K'inich Ahau, as is pictured on Kerr 1398.

== Calendrical functions ==
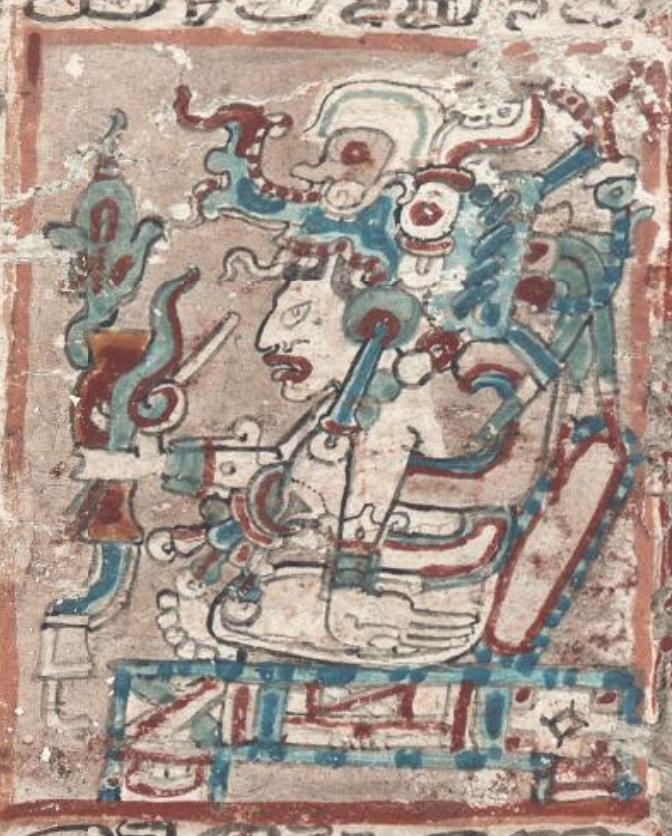
Moon Goddess as she appears in the Dresden Codex

The Maya paid special attention to the phases of the moon and even devoted a section of the "Long Count" to tracking the lunation. As the Moon Goddess governed this celestial body she also held calendrical importance. The Moon Goddess is said to have been patroness of the month of Chʼen 'Well'. ("Moon has gone to her well" is an expression referring to the new Moon.) She is also the patroness of one of the Venus 'years'. Her importance is reflected by the eclipse tables of the Dresden Codex and by the Lunar Series of the Long Count. Glyph C of the Lunar Series (indicating sequences of six lunations for purposes of eclipse prediction) connects her to other deities, such as the death god (God A), the Jaguar God of the Underworld, and perhaps, the Maize God.

== In popular culture ==
The Maya Moon Goddess made an appearance as a playable character under the name Awilix in the video game Smite.

== See also ==
- Awilix
- List of lunar deities

== Bibliography ==
- Karen Bassie-Sweet, Maya Sacred Geography and the Creator Deities. Norman: University of Oklahoma Press 2008.
- Oswaldo Chinchilla Mazariegos, Art and Myth of the Ancient Maya. New Haven: Yale University Press 2017.
- Matthew G. Looper, Ancient Maya Women (Women-Men (and Men-Women): Classic Maya Rulers and the Third Gender. 2002.
- Susan Milbrath, Star Gods of the Maya: Astronomy in Art, Folklore, and Calendars. Austin: University of Texas Press 1999.
- Karl Taube, The Major Gods of Ancient Yucatan. Dumbarton Oaks, Washington 1992.
- Karl Taube, An Illustrated Dictionary of the Gods and Symbols of Ancient Mexico and the Maya. Thames and Hudson 1997.
- J.E.S. Thompson, Maya History and Religion. Norman: University of Oklahoma Press 1970.
- J.E.S. Thompson, An Introduction to Maya Hieroglyphic Writing. Norman: University of Oklahoma Press 1960.
