= Automated Customer Account Transfer Service =

Financial software

Automated Customer Account Transfer Service (ACATS) is an almost entirely electronic system in the United States that executes the transfer of financial securities from a trading account at one institution to the trading account at another. ACATS was developed by the National Securities Clearing Corporation (NSCC), now a subsidiary of Depository Trust & Clearing Corporation (DTCC), a private holding company owned collectively by banks and financial institutions that handles the settlement of the vast majority of securities transactions in the United States.

In 2023, the Financial Industry Regulatory Authority (FINRA) issued new rules regarding ACATS because of concerns about an increase in ACATS fraud. In this type of fraud, the attacker steals a victim's identity, opens a new brokerage account in the victim's name, and issues an ACATS request to transfer securities from the victim's true brokerage account to the new one.

Senators Elizabeth Warren and Ron Wyden reported in 2026 that only a fraction of brokers provided customers with the strongest protections against ACATS transfer fraud. They called on FINRA to require brokers to notify account holders of ACATS transfer requests. Harry Sit provides tips to avoid being victimized by this crime.
