= Xbaquiyalo =

Mayan deity

Xbaquiyalo is a Mayan deity. She was the wife of Hun-Hunahpú, and mother to the Monkey Twins, Hun Batz and Hun Chouén.

It is hypothesized that she is descended from the Lord of Xibalbá.

== Etymology ==
‘Xbaquiyalo’ (pronounced ‘Shba-ki-ya-loo’) is thought to be derived from ‘X-bac-quic’, meaning ‘Little and Gory Bone’ or ‘Little and Gory Kernel’; ‘yaló’ is thought to be a suffix.
