= Ritual of the Bacabs =

Maya manuscript containing incantations

Ritual of the Bacabs is the name given to a manuscript from the Yucatán containing shamanistic incantations written in the Yucatec Maya language. The manuscript was given its name by Mayanist William E. Gates due to the frequent mentioning of the Maya deities known as the Bacabs. A printed indulgence on the last pages dates it to 1779.

== Background ==
The manuscript has been dated at the end of the 18th century, though this is not certain. The style of writing in the manuscript suggests that much of the information included was copied from older works. The work references many figures in Maya mythology who are for the most part unknown from other works.

The manuscript was discovered in the winter of 1914–1915 by Frederic J. Smith through unknown circumstances. William Gates acquired it soon after, and gave it the name by which it is known by today. Athlete Robert Garrett purchased it from Gates in 1930. In 1942, Garrett gave it to Princeton's Institute for Advanced Study. It would later join Garrett's other contributions to the Princeton University Library in 1949, where it remains today.

The text was first described by Alfred M. Tozzer in a publication from 1921. The first, and so far only, translation of the work was completed by Ralph L. Roys in 1965. Roys made his translation using photocopies provided by an employee of the Newberry Library of Chicago.

== Content ==
Ritual of the Bacabs includes some forty-two main incantations, with fragmentary supplements throughout. Most of the manuscript is written in the same hand. In his translation, Roys referred to this main writer as the "Bacabs hand."

There are intrusive passages written in a different hand on pages 20, 21, 62, and 63. Page 70 includes a medical prescription in a different hand. Of the last twenty-four pages, eighteen discuss medicine and plant lore (pp. 215–227, 229–230, and 236–237), three include fragmentary incantation (pp. 231, 233, and 235), and three are blank (pp. 228, 232, and 234). These final parts of the text and the first three pages have never been translated. It is unknown if these last twenty-four pages are written in the same hand as the bulk of the manuscript or in another. In translating the work, Roys wrote "I do not feel competent to comment on the handwriting."

The incantations make several references to Can Ahau, which is either the day 4 Ahau or an alternate spelling of Caan Ahau ("Sky Lord"). Other "proper names" may really be titles. The name Hun-pic-ti-ku ("Eight-Thousand Gods"), which appears in the eighth incantation, may be derived from the Tahdziu deity Hunpic Dziu ("Eight Thousand Cowbirds") or the Izamal deity Hunpic Tok ("Eight Thousand Flints"), or it may be a collective term for all Maya gods.

Diseases and the diseased are also personified in the incantations. In the seventeenth incantation, dealing with the "snake-pulsation-of-the abdomen," the affliction is described as the son of Ix Hun Tipplah Can ("Lady Unique Pulsating Sky").

There are multiple references to Christianity in the text. Almost every incantation ends with "Amen," and the thirty-ninth uses "Jesus Mary" (Jesuz Maria) as an exclamation.

Ritual of the Bacabs is filled with symbolism that has long since lost its significance and meaning. In his Maya History and Religion, J. Eric S. Thompson wrote: "The only parallel which comes to mind of the Book of Revelation. Many plants, birds, and insects, all clothed in symbolism and allusions to lost mythology, are important features...even in translation the incantations are very hard to comprehend."

== Literature ==
- Roys, Ralph L., Ritual of the Bacabs, University of Oklahoma Press
- Thompson, J. Eric S., Maya History and Religion, University of Oklahoma Press
