= Mesoamerican creation myths =

Creation myths from mesoamerican cultures

Mesoamerican creation myths are the collection of creation myths attributed to, or documented for, the various cultures and civilizations of pre-Columbian Mesoamerica and Mesoamerican literature.

== Creation ==
=== Maya ===
The Maya gods included Kukulkán (also known by the Kʼicheʼ name Gukumatz and the Aztec name Quetzalcoatl) and Tepeu. The two were referred to as the Creators, the Forefathers or the Makers. According to the Popol Vuh, the two gods decided to preserve their legacy by creating an Earth-bound species looking like them. The first attempt was man made from mud, but Tepeu and Kukulkán found that the mud crumbled. The two gods summoned the other gods, and together they decided to make man from wood. However, since these men had no soul and soon lost loyalty to the creators, the gods destroyed them by rain. Finally, man was constructed from maize, the Mayans' staple and sacred food. The deity Itzamna is credited as being the creator of the calendar along with creating writing.

=== Aztecs ===
The Aztec people had several versions of creation myths. One version of the myth includes four suns, each representing one of the four elements. In another version of the myth, the creator couple give birth to four sons, Red Tezcatlipoca, Black Tezcatlipoca, Quetzalcoatl, and Huitzilopotchli. In both versions, the suns, or sons, are attributed with the creation of the Earth and common destructions that would have been experienced by the Aztec people such as great floods and volcanic eruptions. Yet another version has Quetzalcoatl and Tezcatlipoca turn into snakes and destroy a great monster, ripping it in two where one half is cast down to become the Earth and one half is cast up to create the heavens.

=== Other ===
Other creation myths that are commonly known to natives of the Mesoamerican region include The Emergence of the Ancestors (Aztec), The Man of the Crops (Jicaque), Why the Earth Eats the Dead (Bribri), and Opossum Steals Fire (Mazatec).

== Ball game ==
One activity that was popular widely among Mesoamerican cultures is the ball game, similar to football, or soccer in the United States. Most societies played the game using their hips instead of feet, called Ullamalitzli. Evidence of the ball game has been found in nearly every Mesoamerican society, including the Olmec, Tlaloc, Aztec and more, and ball courts have also been found in Hispaniola and Puerto Rico, practised by the Taino people. The sacred origins of the ball game can be found in the Popol Vuh, which illustrates how two brothers defeated the gods of the underworld in a ball game and became celestials who became the creators. The ball game may also relate to the movement of the sun through the heavens. Thus it is believed that the ball game remained an important part of Mesoamerican culture as a way to honor the gods who brought about the creation of the Earth and the people.

== Ritual Application ==
During the Postclassic period, the establishment of new temples and political centers often involved foundation rituals that mirrored primordial acts of creation, effectively anchoring the community's history into a sacred, mythic timeline.</ref> Mesoamerican creation myths were physically manifested through architecture and rituals designed to re-create primordial time, as evidenced by Postclassic Maya codices [1.1, 1.2]. These rituals, including the dedication of sacred spaces and the placement of hearthstones, aligned communities with the established cosmic order [1.1]. For further insights on this topic, refer to the work of Vail and Hernández on the subject. In Mesoamerican tradition, creation myths were not merely oral histories but were actively "re-created" through physical rituals and architectural foundations. During the Postclassic period, the establishment of new temples and political centers often involved foundation rituals that mirrored primordial acts of creation, effectively anchoring the community's history into a sacred, mythic timeline.

== See also ==
- Mesoamerican literature
- Mesoamerican world tree
- Five Suns
- Fifth World
