= Qʼuqʼumatz =

Maya creator god of wind and rain

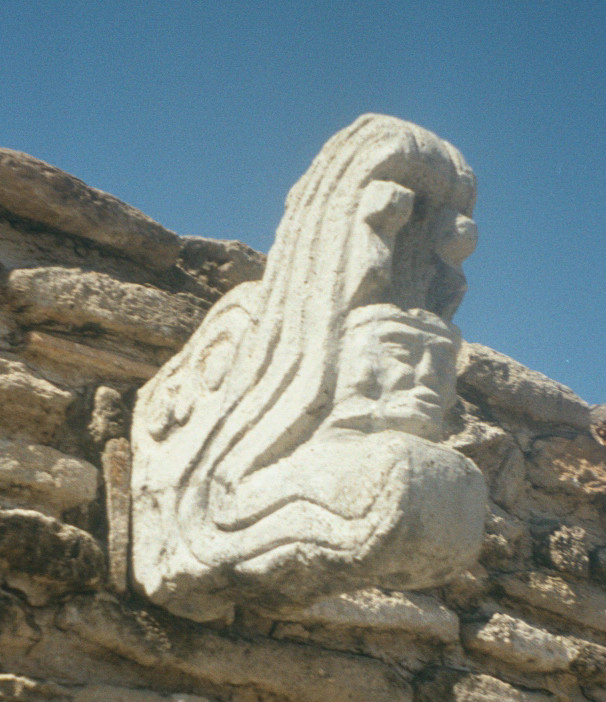
Ballcourt marker at Mixco Viejo, depicting Qʼuqʼumatz carrying Tohil across the sky in his jaws

Qʼuqʼumatz (Mayan: [qʼuːqʼuːˈmats]; alternatively Gukumatz) was a god of wind and rain of the Postclassic Kʼicheʼ Maya. It was the Feathered Serpent that according to the Popol Vuh created the world and humanity, together with the god Tepeu. It carried the sun across the sky and down into the underworld and acted as a mediator between the various powers in the Maya cosmos. It is considered to be the equivalent of the Aztec god Quetzalcoatl and of Kukulkan, of the Yucatec Maya.

Qʼuqʼumatz was also associated with water, clouds, and the sky. Together with Tepeu, god of lightning and fire, it was considered to be the mythical ancestor of the Kʼicheʼ nobility by direct male line.

Kotujaʼ, the Kʼicheʼ king who founded the city of Qʼumarkaj, bore the name of the deity as a title and was likely to have been a former priest of the god. The priests of Qʼuqʼumatz at Qʼumarkaj, the Kʼicheʼ capital, were drawn from the dominant Kaweq dynasty and acted as stewards in the city.

== Etymology ==
Qʼuqʼumatz (alternatively Qucumatz, Gukumatz, Gucumatz, Gugumatz, Kucumatz) translates literally as "quetzal serpent" although it is often rendered less accurately as "feathered serpent". The name derives from the Kʼicheʼ word qʼuq, referring to the Resplendent quetzal Pharomachrus mocinno, a brightly coloured bird of the cloud forests of southern Mesoamerica. This is combined with the word kumatz "snake". It is likely that the feathered serpent deity was borrowed from the Aztecs or the Maya and blended with other deities to provide the god Qʼuqʼumatz that the Kʼicheʼ worshipped. Qʼuqʼumatz may have had his origin in the Valley of Mexico; some scholars have equated the deity with the Aztec deity Ehecatl-Quetzalcoatl, who was also a creator god. Qʼuqʼumatz may originally have been the same god as Tohil, the Kʼicheʼ sun god who also had attributes of the feathered serpent, but they later diverged and each deity came to have a separate priesthood.

== Symbolism ==
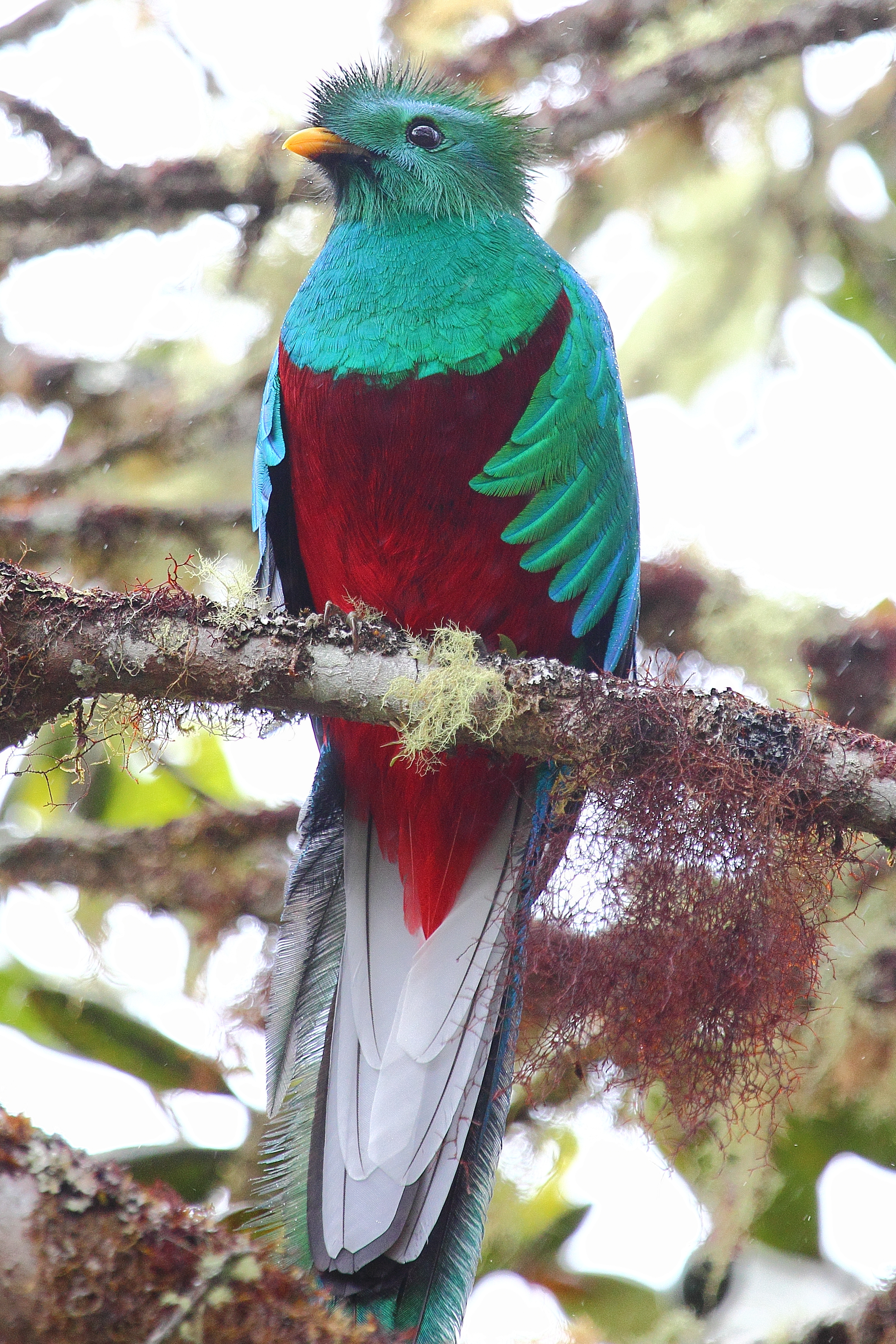
The qʼuq "resplendent quetzal" was strongly associated with Qʼuqʼumatz in Kʼicheʼ belief.

The male resplendent quetzal boasts iridescent blue-green tail feathers measuring up to 1 metre (3.3 ft) long that were prized by the Maya elite. The blue-green feathers symbolized vegetation and the sky, both symbols of life for the ancient Maya, while the bright red feathers of the bird's chest symbolized fire. Together, this combination gave a profound religious symbolism to the bird. The snake was a Maya symbol of rebirth due to its habit of shedding its skin to reveal a fresher one underneath. Qʼuqʼumatz thus combined the celestial characteristics of the quetzal with the serpentine underworld powers of the snake, giving him power over all levels of the Maya universe. These characteristics also indicated a sexual duality between his masculine feathered serpent aspect and his feminine association with water and wind. This duality enabled the god to serve as a mediator between the masculine sun god Tohil and the feminine moon goddess Awilix, a role that was symbolized with the Mesoamerican ballgame.

In ancient Maya highland texts Qʼuqʼumatz is strongly associated with water, which in turn is associated with the underworld. The Kʼicheʼ are reported to have believed that Qʼuqʼumatz was a feathered serpent that moved in the water. In the Annals of the Cakchiquels, it is related that a group of highland Maya referred to themselves as the Gucumatz because their only salvation was said to be in the water. The Kaqchikel Maya were closely linked to the Kʼicheʼ and one of their ancestors, Gagavitz, was said to have thrown himself into Lake Atitlán and transformed himself into the deity, thus raising a storm upon the water known today as Xocomil.

Among the Kʼicheʼ Qʼuqʼumatz not only appeared as a feathered serpent, he was also embodied as an eagle and a jaguar, he was also known to transform himself into a pool of blood. The deity was sometimes represented by a snail or conch shell and was associated with a flute made from bones. As well as being associated with water, Qʼuqʼumatz was also associated with clouds and the wind.

=== Sun and the ballgame ===
Qʼuqʼumatz was not directly equivalent to the Mexican Quetzalcoatl, he combined his attributes with those of the Classic Period Chontal Maya creator god Itzamna and was a two headed serpentine sky monster that carried the sun across the sky. Sculptures of a human face emerging between the jaws of a serpent were common from the end of the Classic Period through to the Late Postclassic and may represent Qʼuqʼumatz in the act of carrying Hunahpu, the youthful avatar of the sun god Tohil, across the sky. After midday, Qʼuqʼumatz continued into the west and descended towards the underworld bearing an older sun. Such sculptures were used as markers for the Mesoamerican ballgame. Since Qʼuqʼumatz acted as a mediator between Tohil and Awilix and their incarnations as the Maya Hero Twins Hunahpu and Ixbalanque, the positioning of such ballcourt markers on the east and west sides of north-south oriented ballcourts would represent Qʼuqʼumatz carrying the sun to the zenith with the east marker carrying Hunahpu/Tohil in its jaws, while the west marker would represent the descent of the sun into the underworld and would be carrying Ixbalanque/Awilix in its jaws.

No ballgame markers are known from the heart of the Kʼicheʼ kingdom and investigators such as Fox consider it significant that these images of Q'uq'umatz carrying the sun are found in the eastern periphery facing the underworld due to the use of the ballgame in mediating political conflict.

=== Modern belief ===
The various feathered serpent deities remained popular in Mesoamerican folk traditions after the Spanish conquest but by the 20th century Qʼuqʼumatz appeared only rarely among the Kʼicheʼ. A tradition was recorded by Juan de León that Qʼuqʼumatz assisted the sun god Tohil in his daily climb to the zenith. According to De León, who may have gathered the information from elders in Santa Cruz del Quiché, the feathered serpent gripped Tohil in his jaws to carry him safely up into the sky.

== Popol Vuh ==
In the beginning of the Popol Vuh, Qʼuqʼumatz is depicted as afloat in the primordial sea with Tepeu, wrapped in quetzal feathers. Nothing yet existed, only the sea at rest under the sky. Soon Qʼuqʼumatz and Tepeu discussed the creation of man and it was decided between them to raise the earth and create mankind. The gods spoke the word "Earth" and the earth was formed as if from a mist. They then called forth the mountains from the water and the mountains rose at their command. Forests of pine and cypress then sprung up among the newly formed mountains and valleys. Qʼuqʼumatz was pleased with their collaborative creation of the earth and thanked the other gods that were present. The gods created animals such as the deer, the birds, pumas, jaguars and different types of snakes. They instructed each animal where it should live. The gods then commanded that the animals should give them praise and worship them. However, the animals could not speak and simply squawked, chattered and roared in their own manner. Qʼuqʼumatz soon realized that their first attempt at the creation of beings was a failure as they could not give them praise and so they condemned the animals to live in the forests and ravines. Their animals were ordered to live in the wild and to let their flesh be eaten by the ones who will keep the days of the gods and show them praise.

They first formed men of mud, but in this form man could neither move nor speak and quickly dissolved into nothingness. Later, they created men of sculpted wood, which Huracan destroyed as the wooden manikins were imperfect, emotionless and showed no praise to the gods. The survivors were then transformed into monkeys, and sentenced to live in the wild. Qʼuqʼumatz and Tepeu were finally successful in their creation by constructing men out of maize. Here the first men were formed: Bʼalam Agab, Bʼalam Quitzé, Iqi Bʼalam, Mahucatah. Their sight was far and they understood all.

The Popol Vuh also mentions a historic ruler of the Kʼicheʼ who bore the name or title of the deity, probably because he drew some of his power from the god. This title of "Feathered Serpent", was an important title used for historical figures in other parts of Mesoamerica, the personal name of this king was likely to have been Kotujaʼ. This individual was likely to have been an Aj Qʼuqʼumatz, or priest of Qʼuqʼumatz, before he became the Aj pop (king). This king was said to have refounded the Kʼicheʼ capital at Qʼumarkaj.

== Temple and priesthood at Qʼumarkaj ==
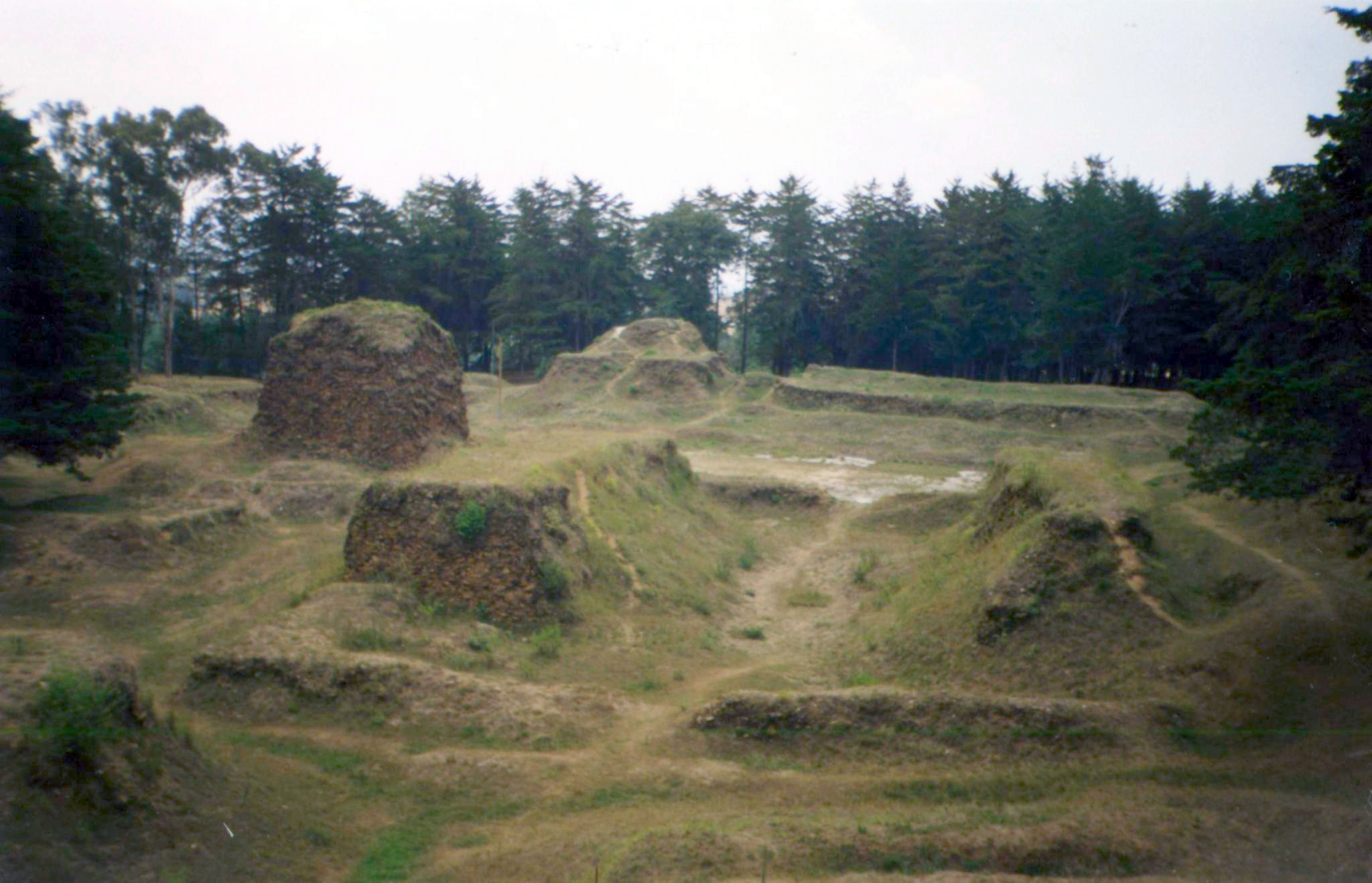
The ruins of Qʼumarkaj. The temple of Qʼuqʼumatz once stood between the Temple of Tohil (tower at middle left) and the Temple of Awilix (at back). The ballcourt is in the foreground.

In the Kʼicheʼ capital city Qʼumarkaj the temple of Qʼuqʼumatz consisted of a circular temple in honor of the deity together with a palace in honor of the Kawek lineage, the ruling dynasty of the city. The only trace of the temple now is a circular impression in the surface of the city's main plaza. The temple was located directly between the temples to the important Kʼicheʼ deities Tohil and Awilix, slightly north of the central axis of the temple of Tohil and slightly south of the axis of the temple of Awilix, replicating the role of Qʼuqʼumatz as mediator between the two deities. From the traces left in the plaza it is evident that the temple consisted of a circular wall measuring 6 metres (20 ft) across, running around a circular platform, with a 1-metre (3.3 ft) wide circular passage between the two. The whole structure probably once supported a roof and there were small stone platforms on the east and west sides of the temple, each about 1 metre (3.3 ft) wide. The temple of Qʼuqʼumatz must have been completely dismantled very soon after the Spanish Conquest since it is not mentioned by any of the Colonial era visitors, and early drawings of the site show only vegetation where the temple once stood. The tradition of circular temples dedicated to the Feathered Serpent deity was an ancient one in the Mesoamerican cultural region.

The priests of Qʼuqʼumatz were drawn from an important lineage among the ruling Kaweq dynasty and this was likely to have been a source of power and prestige for the Kaweq. The priests were known as Aj Qʼuqʼumatz, meaning "he of Qʼuqʼumatz". The priests of Qʼuqʼumatz and of Tepeu, his partner in the Kʼicheʼ creation myth (the Aj Qʼuqʼumatz and the Tepew Yaki), also served as stewards in Qʼumarkaj and were responsible for receiving and guarding any tribute payments and plunder that were returned to the city. Although Kʼicheʼ priests were generally of lower rank than secular officials, the priests of the Kaweq lineages were an exception, and this included the priests of Qʼuqʼumatz, Tepeu and Tohil.

== See also ==
- Cosmic Man
- Aztec mythology
- Jacawitz
