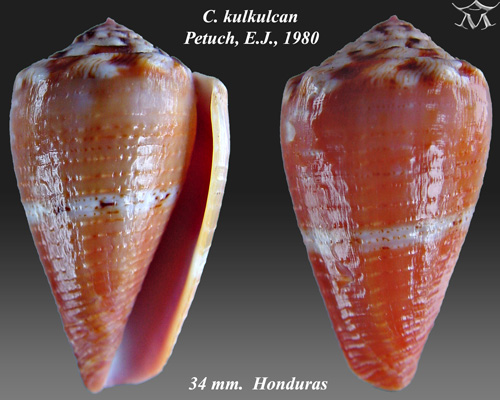
- Apertural and abapertural views of shell of Conus kulkulcan Petuch, E.J., 1980

Conservation status
- Least Concern (IUCN 3.1)

Scientific classification
- Kingdom: Animalia
- Phylum: Mollusca
- Class: Gastropoda
- Subclass: Caenogastropoda
- Order: Neogastropoda
- Superfamily: Conoidea
- Family: Conidae
- Genus: Conus
- Species: C. kulkulcan

Binomial name
- Conus kulkulcan Petuch, 1980

Synonyms
- Conus (Dauciconus) kulkulcan Petuch, 1980 · accepted, alternative representation; Purpuriconus kulkulcan (Petuch, 1980)

= Conus kulkulcan =

Species of sea snail

Conus kulkulcan is a species of predatory sea snail, a marine gastropod mollusk in the family Conidae, the cone snails or cone shells.

Like all species within the genus Conus, these snails are venomous and capable of stinging humans. Their name references Kukulkan, a Mayan deity. It can be found in shallow sandy substrates in the western Caribbean and is assessed as least concern by the IUCN.

== Description ==
The shell is cone-shaped (like other species in Conidae) with a short, pointed spire and reaches up to 36 mm in length. It typically exhibits a deep red coloration, often with a lighter band in the middle, and the mantle of live specimens is dark red. Some specimens are blue-gray as described by E.J. Petuch, the first to discover the species.

== Habitat ==
This marine species can be found in the western Caribbean Sea, with records from Belize, Honduras (notably Roatán Island), Cuba and Panama. It lives in shallow marine environments on sandy substrates beneath coral, at depths of 2-15 meters.
