= Qʼumarkaj =

Archeological site in Guatemala

- Utatlán
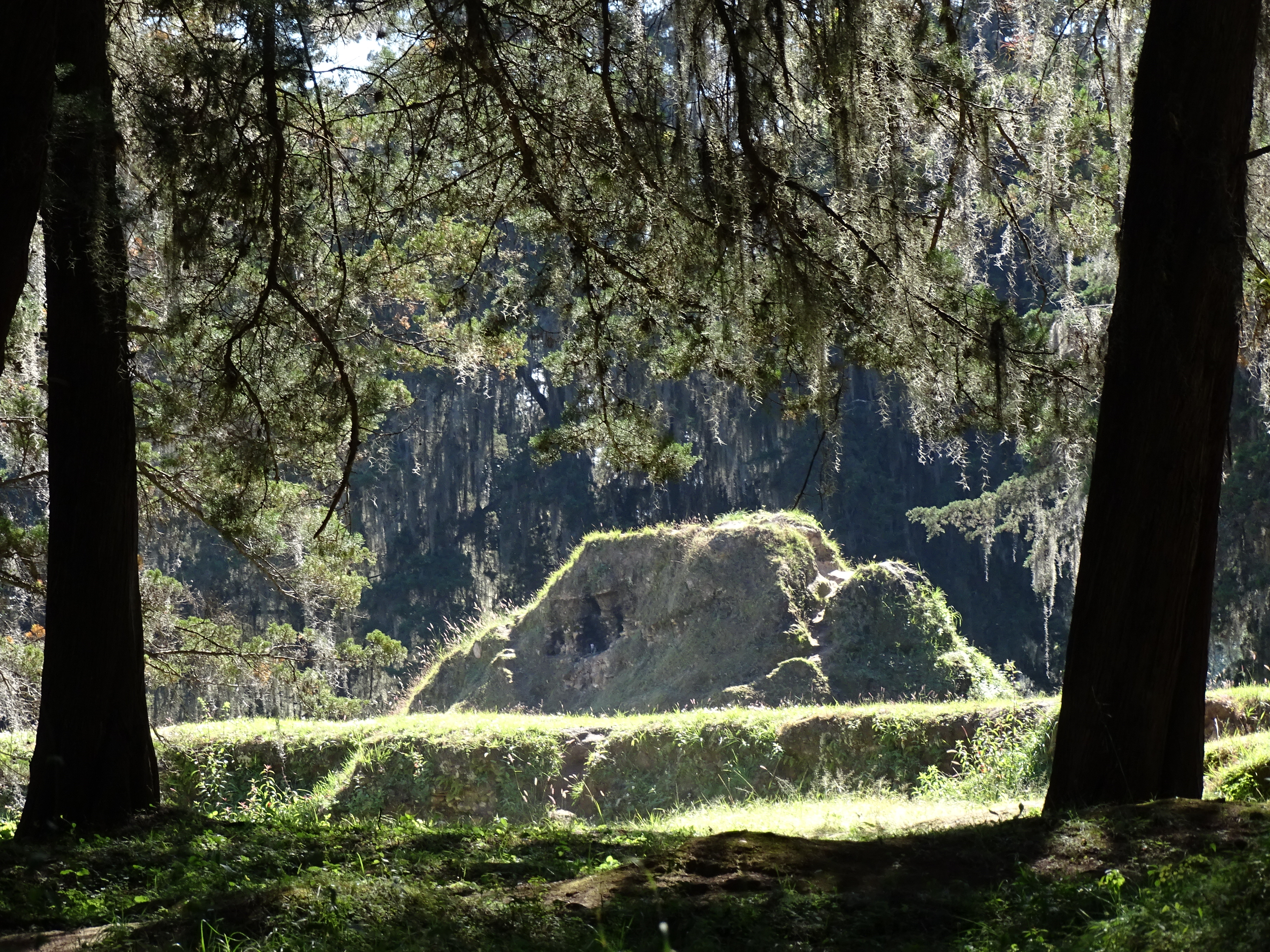

- Location of the site Qʼumarkaj (Guatemala)
- 15°1′24.7″N 91°10′19.16″W
- Type: Settlement
- Periods: Late Postclassic
- Cultures: Maya civilization
- Location: Santa Cruz del Quiché, Quiché Department, Guatemala

History
- Built: 1400
- Abandoned: 1524

Site notes
- Condition: In ruins

Qʼumarkaj (Kʼicheʼ: [qʼumarˈkaχ]) (sometimes rendered as Gumarkaaj, Gumarcaj, Cumarcaj or Kumarcaaj) is an archaeological site in the southwest of the El Quiché department of Guatemala. Qʼumarkaj is also known as Utatlán, the Nahuatl translation of the city's name. The name comes from Kʼicheʼ Qʼumarkah "Place of old reeds".

Qʼumarkaj was one of the most powerful Maya cities when the Spanish arrived in the region in the early 16th century. It was the capital of the Kʼicheʼ Maya in the Late Postclassic Period. At the time of the Spanish Conquest, Qʼumarkaj was a relatively new capital, with the capital of the Kʼicheʼ kingdom having originally been situated at Jakawitz (identified with the archaeological site Chitinamit) and then at Pismachiʼ. Qʼumarkaj was founded during the reign of king Qʼuqʼumatz ("Feathered Serpent" in Kʼicheʼ) in the early 15th century, immediately to the north of Pismachiʼ. In 1470 the city was seriously weakened by a rebellion among the nobility that resulted in the loss of key allies of the Kʼicheʼ.

Archaeologically and ethnohistorically, Qʼumarkaj is the best known of the Late Postclassic highland Maya capitals. The earliest reference to the site in Spanish occurs in Hernán Cortés' letters from Mexico. Although the site has been investigated, little reconstruction work has taken place. The surviving architecture, which includes a Mesoamerican ballcourt, temples and palaces, has been badly damaged by the looting of stone to build the nearby town of Santa Cruz del Quiché.

The major structures of Qʼumarkaj were laid out around a plaza. They included the temple of Tohil, a jaguar god who was patron of the city, the temple of Awilix, the patron goddess of one of the noble houses, the temple of Jakawitz, a mountain deity who was also a noble patron and the temple of Qʼuqʼumatz, the Feathered Serpent, the patron of the royal house. The main ballcourt was placed between the palaces of two of the principal noble houses. Palaces, or nimja, were spread throughout the city. There was also a platform that was used for gladiatorial sacrifice.

The area of Greater Qʼumarkaj was divided into four major political division, one for each of the most important ruling lineages, and also encompassed a number of smaller satellites sites, including Chisalin, Pismachiʼ, Atalaya and Pakaman. The site core is open to the public and includes basic infrastructure, including a small site museum.

== Etymology ==
Qʼumarkaj comes from the Kʼicheʼ Qʼumqaraqʼaj. While often translated as "place of old reeds" or "place of rotted cane", the name Qʼumaʼrkaʼaaj translates more precisely as "rotted reed houses" (qʼumaʼr = "rotten"; kaʼaaj = "house or shack built of cane and reeds"). It was translated as Tecpan Utatlan by the Nahuatl-speaking Tlaxcalan allies of the Spanish conquistadors, with Tecpan being added to distinguish the city as being a seat of rule, equivalent to the Tollan used in Mesoamerica in earlier times.

== Location ==
The ruins of the city are 2.5 kilometres (1.6 mi) to the west of the modern city of Santa Cruz del Quiché. Qʼumarkaj completely occupies 120,000 square metres (1,300,000 sq ft) of an easily defended plateau surrounded by ravines over 100 metres (330 ft) deep. The ravines are part of a drainage system feeding the Negro River, which flows into the Chixoy River and eventually into the Usumacinta River and the Gulf of Mexico. A natural causeway to the southeast of the site links the plateau with a wide plain to the east.

Qʼumarkaj is the largest in a group of five major sites tightly clustered in an area of 4 square kilometres (1.5 sq mi), with the area between the sites showing signs of also having been heavily occupied. Atalaya and Pakaman lie to the east, Pismachiʼ lies to the south and Chisalin is to the north.

== Plateau Geomorphology and Hydrogeology ==
The defensive layout of Qʼumarkaj was dictated by the structural geomorphology of the El Quiché plateau, where Late Cenozoic volcanic ash deposits overlie heavily weathered Cretaceous limestone strata. The 100-meter deep ravines encircling the plateau were carved by extreme fluvial incision into soft pumice tuff, creating isolated mesa topography within the upper Chixoy River catchment basin.

- Karst Ravine Drainage Network: The steep cliffs forming the boundary of the plateau direct all surface runoff into ephemeral gullies that feed the Río Negro, preventing standing water accumulation on the urban core while providing high natural escarpments for defensive fortifications.
- Subterranean Speleothems and Caves: The artificial and modified natural cave systems in the northern ravine walls cut through soft marl and volcanic ash layers, tapping into localized perched water tables that supplied ceremonial water during seasonal droughts in the Late Postclassic.
- Postclassic Soil Erosion Layers: Geoarchaeological core samples across the surrounding valley show heavy siltation beds corresponding to the 15th-century population peak, recording intensive hillside terracing, deforestation for lime plaster production, and altered local microclimates prior to the Spanish Conquest.

== Inhabitants ==
In the Late Postclassic, the greater Qʼumarkaj area is estimated to have had a population of around 15,000. The inhabitants of Qʼumarkaj were divided socially between the nobility and their vassals. The nobles were known as the ajaw, while the vassals were known as the al kʼajol. The nobility were the patrilineal descendants of the founding warlords who appear to have entered as conquerors from the Gulf coast around AD 1200 and who eventually lost their original language and adopted that of their subjects. The nobles were regarded as sacred and bore royal imagery. Their vassals served as foot-soldiers and were subject to the laws laid out by the nobility, although they could receive military titles as a result of their battlefield prowess. The social divisions were deep-seated and were equivalent to strictly observed castes. The merchants were a privileged class, although they had to make tributary payments to the nobility. In addition to these classes, the population included rural labourers and artisans. Slaves were also held and included both sentenced criminals and prisoners of war.

There were twenty-four important lineages, or nimja, in Qʼumarkaj, closely linked to the palaces in which the nobility attended to their duties; nimja means "big house" in Kʼicheʼ, after the palace complexes that the lineages occupied. Their duties included marriage negotiations and associated feasting and ceremonial lecturing. These lineages were strongly patrilineal and were grouped into four larger, more powerful nimja that chose the rulers of the city. At the time of the Conquest, the four ruling nimja were the Kaweq, the Nijaib, the Saqik and the Ajaw Kʼicheʼ. The Kaweq and the Nijaib included nine principal lineages each, the Ajaw Kʼicheʼ included four and the Saqik had two. As well as choosing the king and king elect, the ruling Kaweq dynasty also had a lineage that produced the powerful priests of Qʼuqʼumatz, who may have served as stewards of the city.

The Kʼicheʼ kingdom was ruled by a king, a king-elect and two captains, a four-way joint rule embodied in four leaders, one from each of the four most important lineages in the city of Qʼumarkaj. This form of rule was also known among the Maya of Yucatan. The ruling lineage was the Kaweq ("Rain") dynasty, that chose both the king and the king-elect. The king was known as the ajpop, "He of the Mat". The king-elect bore the title of ajpop kʼamha and assisted the king until he became king himself. The Nijaib and the Saqik noble houses chose the qʼalel (supreme judge) and the Ajaw Kʼicheʼ chose the atzij winaq (speaker).

== History ==
Ceramic remains from the site include pieces that date as far back as the Preclassic Period but the majority of finds date to the Late Postclassic and the height of the Kʼicheʼ kingdom.

=== Founding and expansion ===
Ruler's Name	Ruled
Qʼuqʼumatz	1400–1425
Kʼiqʼab	1425–1475
Vahxakʼ i-Kaam	1475–1500
Oxib-Keh	1500–1524
All dates are approximate.

The site was founded by king Qʼuqʼumatz around 1400 for its defensive position, however there is some disagreement as to whether he is a historical or a mythological figure. Qʼuqʼumatz is Kʼiche for feathered serpent, and feathered serpent is used as a title in other parts of Mesoamerica. It is probable that Qʼuqʼumatz was really the title of another ajpop mentioned in the sources, Kotujaʼ, and was actually the same individual. In the Título de los Señores de Totonicapán, an early Colonial era Kʼicheʼ document, he is listed as Qʼuqʼumatz Kotujaʼ. In the same title, his father is listed as Kotujaʼ Qʼuqʼumatz, and there is confusion in the Kʼicheʼ documents as to whether they were one and the same, or father and son with very similar names.

Kʼotuja Qʼuqʼumatz married Xlem, daughter of the king of the Tzʼutujils of Malaj, a precolumbian settlement near modern-day San Lucas Tolimán, on the shores of Lake Atitlán. Great magical powers were attributed to Qʼuqʼumatz and he was said to be able to transform himself into a snake, an eagle, a jaguar and blood. Qʼuqʼumatz had several children, one of whom (Kʼiqʼab) became king after him. Qʼuqʼumatz was killed in battle against the Kʼoja Maya.

Qʼuqʼumatz greatly expanded the Kʼicheʼ kingdom, first from Pismachiʼ and later from Qʼumarkaj. At this time, the Kʼicheʼs were closely allied with the Kaqchikels. Qʼuqʼumatz sent his daughter to marry the lord of the Kʼoja, a Maya people based in the Cuchumatan mountains, somewhere between Sacapulas and Huehuetenango. Instead of marrying her and submitting to the Kʼicheʼ-Kaqchikel alliance, Tekum Sikʼom, the Kʼoja king, killed the offered bride. This act initiated a war between the Kʼicheʼ-Kaqchikel of Qʼumarkaj and the Kʼoja. Qʼuqʼumatz died in the resulting battle against the Kʼoja.

With the death of his father in battle against the Kʼoja, his son and heir Kʼiqʼab swore vengeance, and two years later he led the Kʼicheʼ-Kaqchikel alliance against his enemies, together with the Ajpop Kʼamha (king-elect). The Kʼicheʼ-led army entered Kʼoja at first light, killed Tekum Sikʼom and captured his son. Kʼiqʼab recovered the bones of his father and returned to Qʼumarkaj with many prisoners and all the jade and metal that the Kʼoja possessed, after conquering various settlements in the Sacapulas area, and the Mam people near Zaculeu.

Kʼiqʼab was said to have had magical powers like his father. Kʼiqʼab was a particularly warlike king and during his reign he greatly expanded the kingdom to include Rabinal, Cobán and Quetzaltenango, and extended as far west as the Okos River, near the modern border between the Chiapas coast of Mexico and Guatemalan Pacific coast. With Kaqchikel help, the eastern frontier of the kingdom was pushed as far as the Motagua River and south as far as Escuintla. However, he also suffered a humiliating rebellion that eventually resulted in the loss of his key Kaqchikel allies. Kʼiqʼab died around 1475.

=== Internal strife ===
In 1470 a rebellion shook Qʼumarkaj during a great celebration that saw a large gathering that included representatives of all the most important highland peoples. Two sons of Kʼiqʼab together with some of his vassals rebelled against their king, killing many high ranking lords, Kaqchikel warriors and members of the Kaweq lineage. The rebels tried to kill Kʼiqʼab himself but he was defended by sons loyal to him in Pakaman, on the outskirts of the city. As a result of the rebellion, Kʼiqʼab was forced to make concessions to the rebelling Kʼicheʼ lords. The newly empowered Kʼicheʼ lords turned against their Kaqchikel allies, who were forced to flee Qʼumarkaj and found their own capital at Iximche.

After the death of king Kʼiqʼab in 1475 the Kʼicheʼ were engaged in warfare against both the Tzʼutujils and the Kaqchikels, perhaps in an attempt to recover the former power of Qʼumarkaj. A short time after the death of Kʼiqʼab, under the leadership of Tepepul, Qʼumarkaj attacked Iximche, the capital of the Kaqchikels, and suffered a disastrous defeat that greatly weakened the Kʼicheʼ. After this Qʼumarkaj never again directly challenged the Kaqchikels of Iximche. The next leader after Tepepul was Tekum, who was a son of Kʼiqʼab. who led the Kʼicheʼs against the Tzʼutujils and was killed in battle near the south shore of Lake Atitlan.

Late in the history of Qʼumarkaj, the Nijaib appear to have been challenging the ruling Kaweq house for supremacy.

=== Conquest and destruction ===
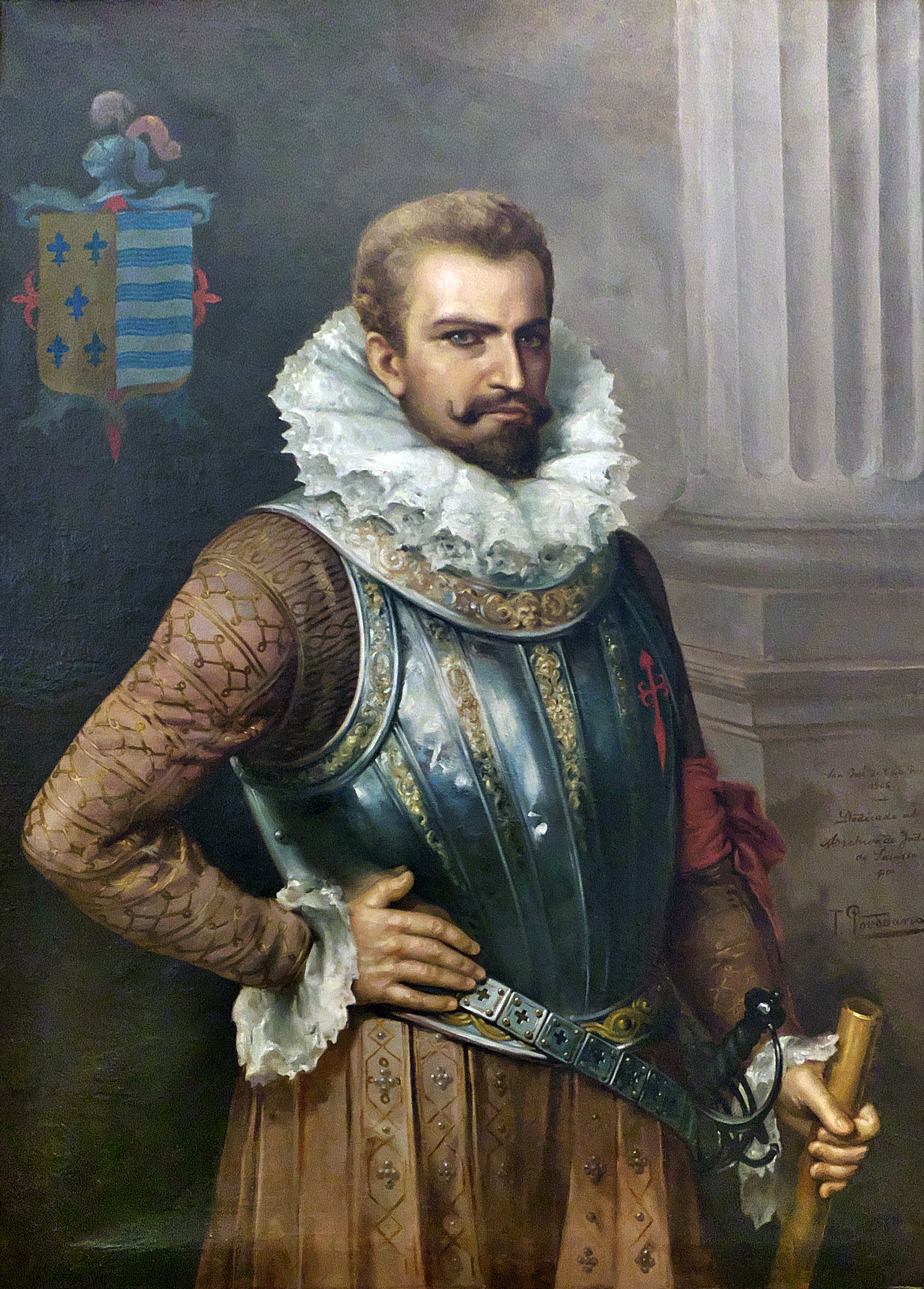
Pedro de Alvarado, the conquistador who razed Qʼumarkaj.

In March 1524, the Spanish conquistador Pedro de Alvarado entered Qʼumarkaj when invited by the remaining lords of the Kʼicheʼ, after he defeated the Kʼicheʼ army in the Quetzaltenango valley, in a battle that had resulted in the death of Tecun Uman, one of the four lords of the city. Alvarado feared that a trap had been laid for him by the Kʼicheʼ lords but entered the city anyway. However, he encamped on the plain outside the city rather than accepting lodgings inside. Fearing the great number of Kʼicheʼ warriors gathered outside the city and that his cavalry would not be able to manoeuvre in the narrow streets of Qʼumarkaj, he invited the highest lords of the city, Oxib-Keh (the ajpop) and Beleheb-Tzy (the ajpop kʼamha) to visit him in his camp. As soon as they did so, he seized them and kept them as prisoners in his camp. The Kʼicheʼ warriors, seeing their lords taken prisoner, attacked the Spaniards' indigenous allies and managed to kill one of the Spanish soldiers. At this point Alvarado decided to have the captured Kʼicheʼ lords burnt to death, he then proceeded to burn the entire city.

=== Modern history ===
The site was extensively documented in the colonial era. Francisco Ximénez, who first revealed the Kʼicheʼ epic Popul Vuh to the world, visited Qʼumarkaj in the final years of the 17th century. Miguel Rivera y Maestre wrote a report of the site for the government of Guatemala in 1834. In 1840 John Lloyd Stephens and Frederick Catherwood paid a brief visit to the site after reading Rivera y Maestre's report, and Catherwood mapped the site and produced a drawing of the Temple of Tohil. In 1865, the French architect Cesar Daly mapped the five clustered sites that include Qʼumarkaj, although the maps have since been lost. A more detailed survey of the site was made by Alfred P. Maudslay in 1887, being published between 1889 and 1902. Archeological excavations were carried out in the 1950s and the 1970s.

Jorge F. Guillemín cleared the ruins in 1956, mapped the surviving structures, as well as mapping the central Kʼicheʼ region and Qʼumarkaj's satellite sites. The State University of New York at Albany spent three seasons excavating the ruins in the early 1970s. Kenneth Brown of the University of Houston started major excavations at Qʼumarkaj in 1977.

In 2003, the Proyecto Etnoarqueológico Qʼumʼarkaj ("Qʼumarkaj Ethnoarchaeological Project") has worked to reconstruct the history and socio-political organisation of the city through archaeological studies combined with ethnohistorical investigations.

The archaeological site is still used for traditional Maya ceremonies, and is one of the most popular destinations in Guatemala for this kind of ritual activity, especially at the solstices and for the New Year.

== Site description ==
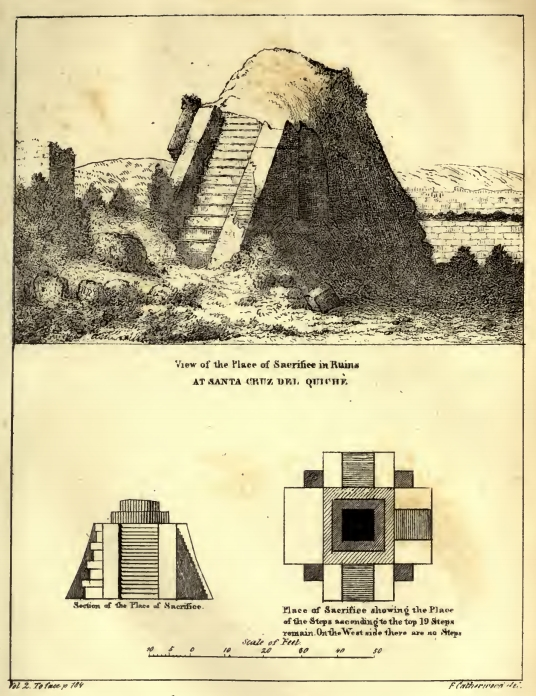
The Temple of Tohil as drawn by Frederick Catherwood in 1840

The site can be visited, although little restoration work has been done to it. Various temple pyramids, the remains of palaces (mostly reduced to mounds of rubble) and a court for playing the Mesoamerican ballgame can be seen in the site core. In the Greater Qʼumarkaj area there were four ballcourts, one in each of the four major political divisions of the city, testifying to the central role of the ballgame ritual in the sociopolitical organisation of the city.

Cut stone originally facing the buildings was taken to build the new buildings of Santa Cruz del Quiché; the ruins were still being mined for construction material through the late 19th century, doing extensive damage to the remains of the old buildings.

The major structures of Qʼumarkaj were laid out around a plaza, which had a plaster floor. The Kʼicheʼ colonnaded buildings at Qʼumarkaj appear to indicate ties with the distant city of Mayapan in the Yucatan Peninsula. The parallels also include skull imagery, effigy figure censers, squatting figures and the generous application of stucco. A combined aerial and surface analysis of the ruins has revealed a strongly patterned arrangement with repeating combinations of pyramids, long structures and multipatio residential complexes. These repeating combinations appear to be linked to the different nimja lineages. In addition there appears to be a larger division of the site, separating it into northwestern and southwestern halves. The dividing line runs from the west along a street to the central plaza, crosses the ballcourt and the plaza, then separates the northern and eastern branches of the site up to the rim of the canyon on the eastern side. This larger site division places six nimja complexes in the northern half and six in the south, although this larger division may not have been strictly along lineage lines, since Kaweq-linked structures are found in both halves of the site. The Kaweq and their allies dominated most of the site, with the Nijaib occupying the eastern portion, possibly as far as the satellite site of Atalaya.

=== Temple of Tohil ===
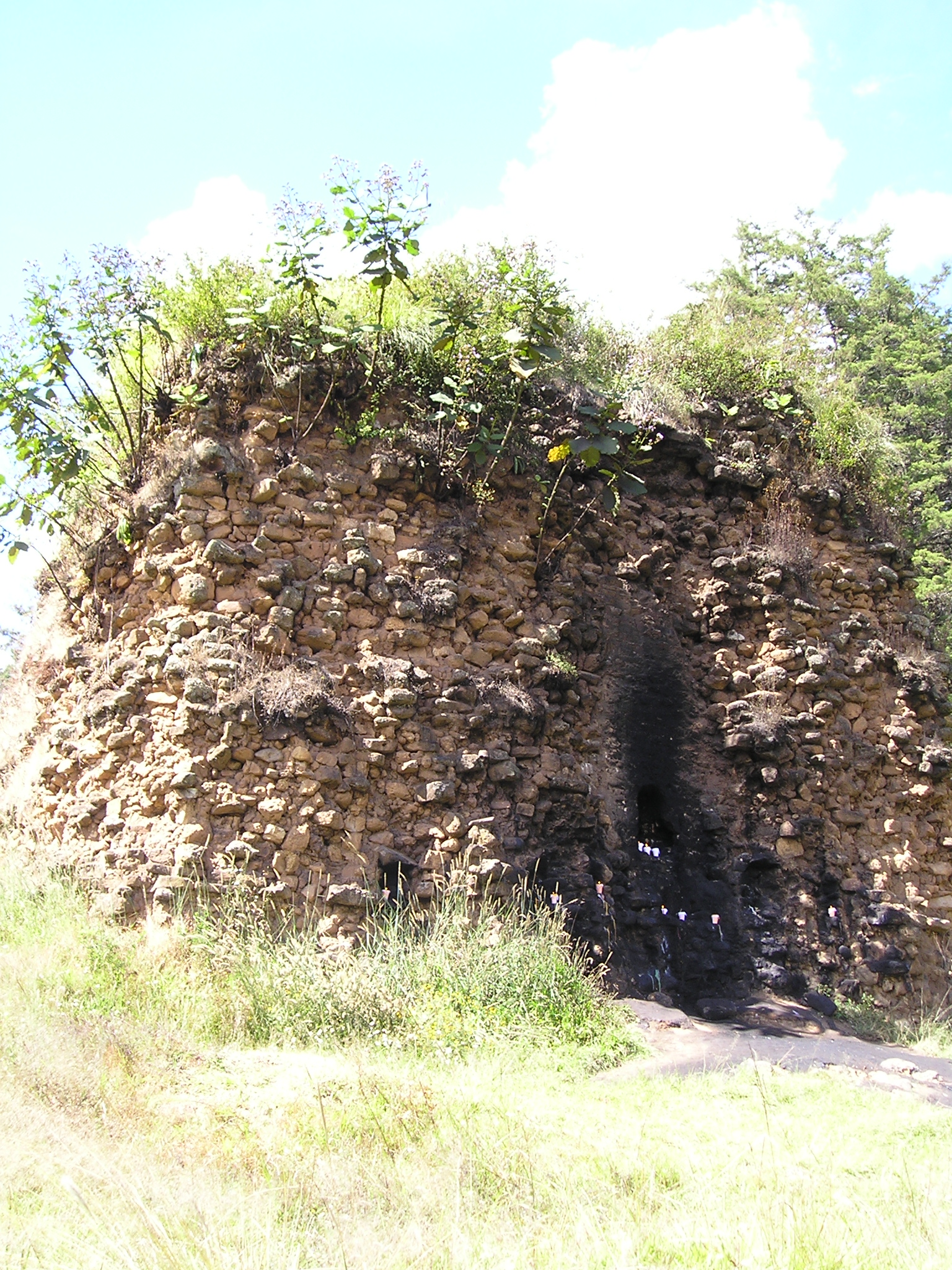
The remains of the temple of Tohil at Qʼumarkaj.

The plaza was dominated by the Temple of Tohil, who was a jaguar deity associated with the sun and with rain and was the patron deity of Qʼumarkaj. This temple lies on the western side of the main plaza. The standing remains are reduced to the rubble and mud core of the temple, with an opening where modern Maya still make offerings. As late as the middle of the 19th century, this temple was much better preserved and was described by John Lloyd Stephens. Originally the temple consisted of a steep pyramid with stairways on three sides, all except the west, and a temple building was on the summit. The base was 33 feet (10 m) on each side and the exterior of the building was covered in painted stucco. Catherwood's copy of Rivera y Maestre's drawing of the temple showed the body of the pyramid divided into four talud-tablero terraces and 19 steps in each of the three stairways, while Rivera y Maestra's drawing depicts 24 steps and six terraces. Francisco Ximénez, writing at the end of the 17th century, described the temple as the tallest building in Qʼumarkaj. The identity of the temple as that of Tohil was known during the lifetime of Ximénez, when 30 steps were visible in each stairway and the remains of the pillars that supported the temple roof were still standing. The building style of the Temple of Tohil is similar to that of the most important temples of Mayapan and Chichen Itza, far to the north in the Yucatan Peninsula. The pillars possibly once supported an elaborate masonry roof.

The Temple of Tohil was used for human sacrifice, the bodies of the sacrificial victims were probably hurled down the front stairway before being decapitated and the heads places on a skull rack. This tzumpan was likely to have been located immediately to the southeast of the temple, in an area that is now buried under rubble fallen from the temple itself.

An image of a jaguar was found painted onto the stucco of the temple, an animal that was a nahual of the ruling Kaweq dynasty.

=== Temple of Awilix ===
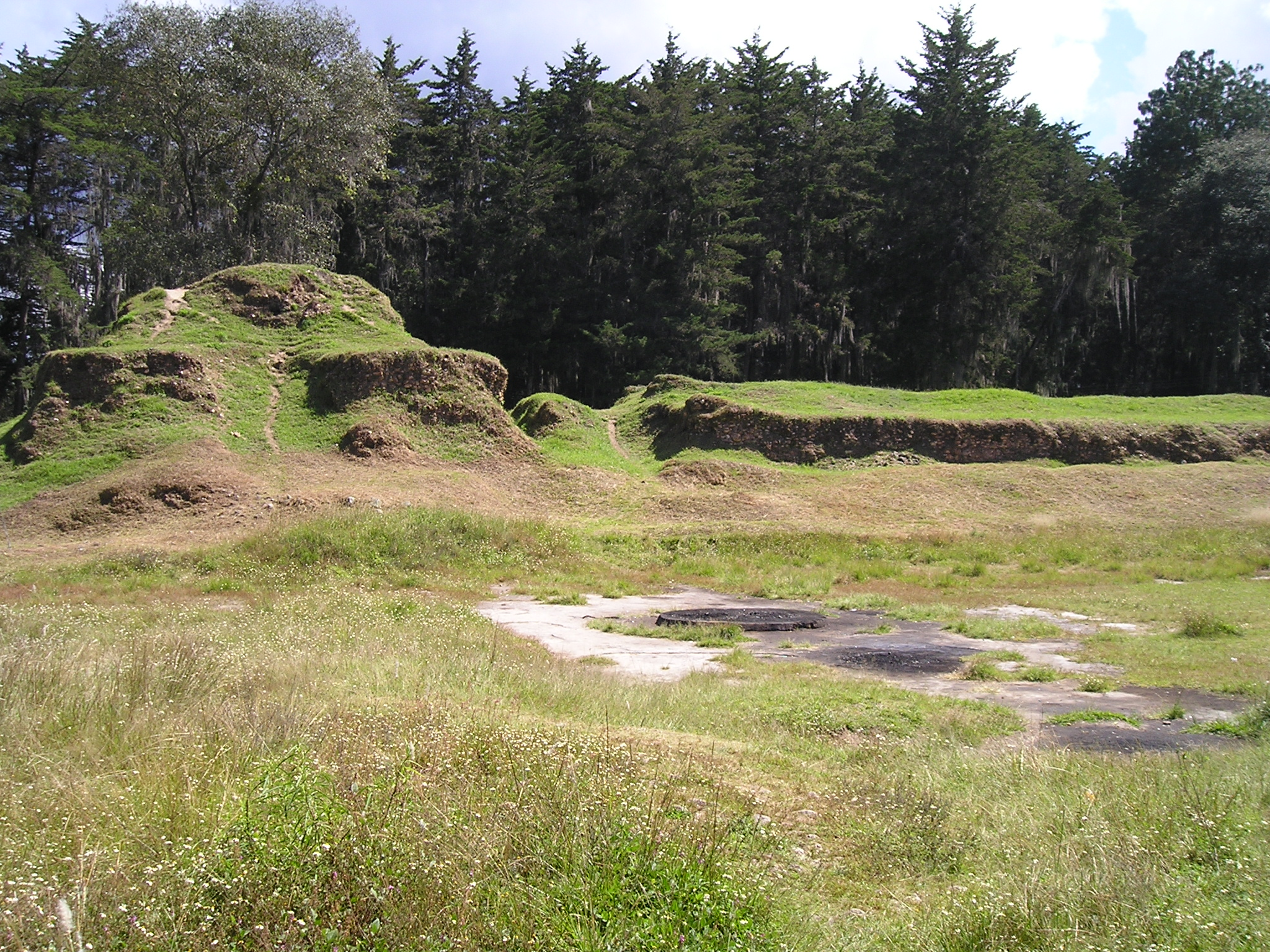
The Temple of Awilix.

The Temple of Awilix is on the east side of the plaza. Awilix was the patron goddess of the Nijaib lineage and is identified with Ixbalanque, one of the Hero Twins from the Popul Vuh. According to a drawing made by Rivera y Maestre, the temple of Awilix was not as tall as the temple of Tohil. This structure was apparently the second most important temple in Qʼumarkaj. Originally this temple was formed of a large rectangular platform supporting a smaller platform and a temple structure on the east side. A wide stairway climbed the west side of the temple, it was flanked on the lower level by two large talud-tablero panels. The exterior stonework of the building has been completely stripped away. The temple is similar in form to a temple mound on the west side of the first plaza in Iximche, the postclassic capital of the Kaqchikel Maya. There were four principal phases of construction and there is evidence that the temple had been repaired various times prior to the Conquest. The floor under the third phase of construction had been painted dark green. Archaeological investigations found fragments of incense burners underneath the first building phase.

=== Temple of Jakawitz ===
A large mound on the south side of the plaza was once the Temple of Jakawitz, a deity of the mountains and the patron of the Ajaw Kʼicheʼ lineage. Like the other structures of Qʼumarkaj, all the stone facing has been robbed, leaving only a rubble and mud core. This structure was part of a complex that consisted of a patio enclosed by the temple on the northern side, a palace on the southern side and a long building on the east. The Jakawitz complex has not been investigated archaeologically. Drawings by Rivera y Maestre suggest that the temple was a narrow building with four or five terraces.

=== Temple of Qʼuqʼumatz ===
The temple of Qʼuqʼumatz was a circular temple of the feathered serpent, and a palace in honour of the Kawek lineage, the ruling dynasty of the city. The temple is now only a circular impression in the surface of the main plaza. It is located directly between the temples of Tohil and Awilix, slightly north of the central axis of the Tohil temple and slightly south of the axis of the Awilix temple. From the traces left in the plaza it is evident that the temple consisted of a circular wall measuring 6 metres (20 ft) across, running around a circular platform, with a 1-metre (3.3 ft) wide circular passage between the two. The whole structure probably once supported a roof and there were small stone platforms on the east and west sides of the temple, each about 1 metre (3.3 ft) wide.

The priests of Qʼuqʼumatz were drawn from an important lineage among the ruling Kaweq dynasty and this was likely to have been a source of power and prestige for the Kaweq. The temple of Qʼuqʼumatz must have been completely dismantled very soon after the Spanish Conquest since it is not mentioned by any of the Colonial era visitors, and early drawings of the site show only vegetation where the temple once stood. The tradition of circular temples dedicated to the Feathered Serpent deity was an ancient one in the Mesoamerican cultural region.

=== Ballcourt ===
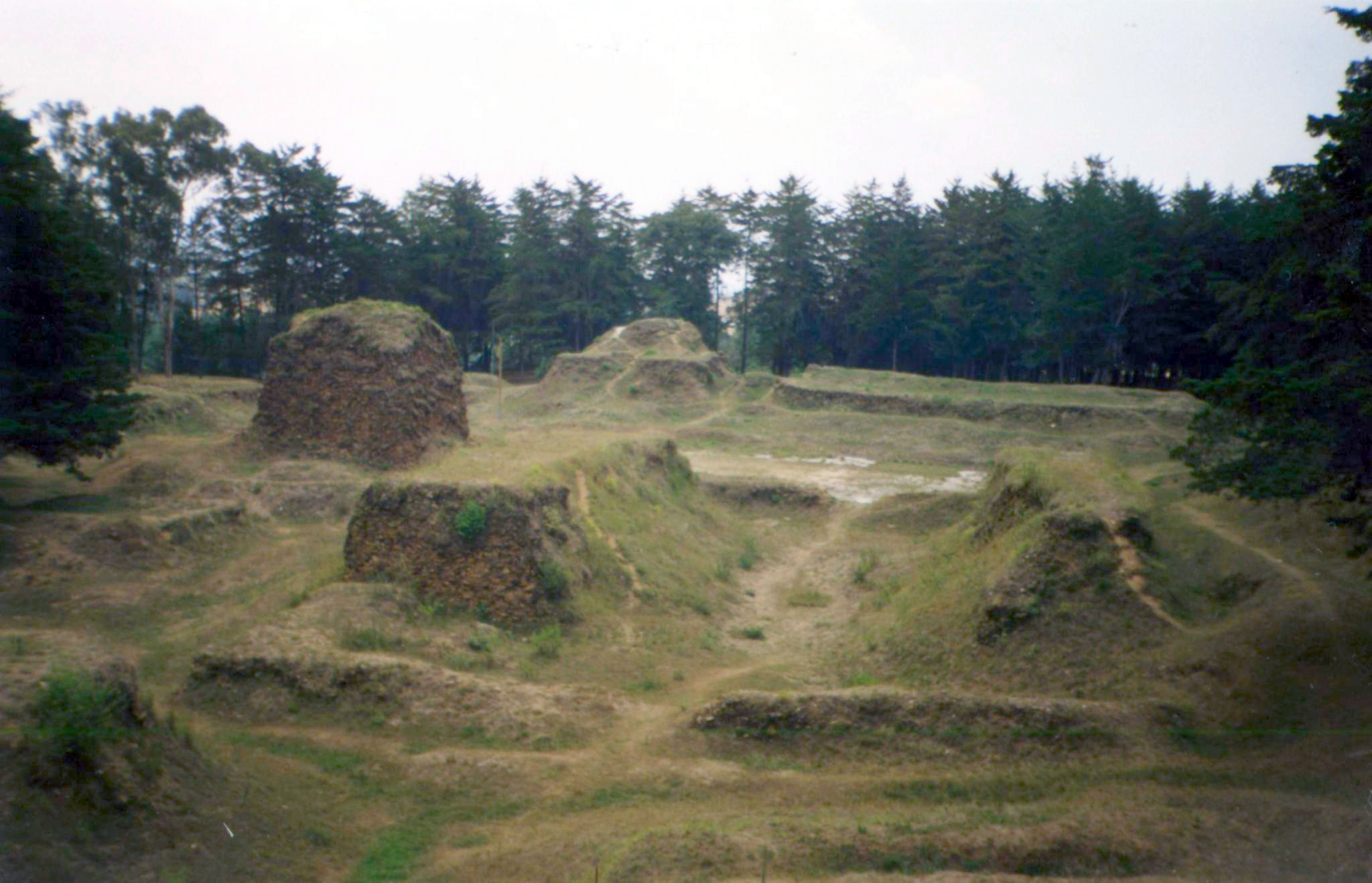
The central ballcourt of Qʼumarkaj.

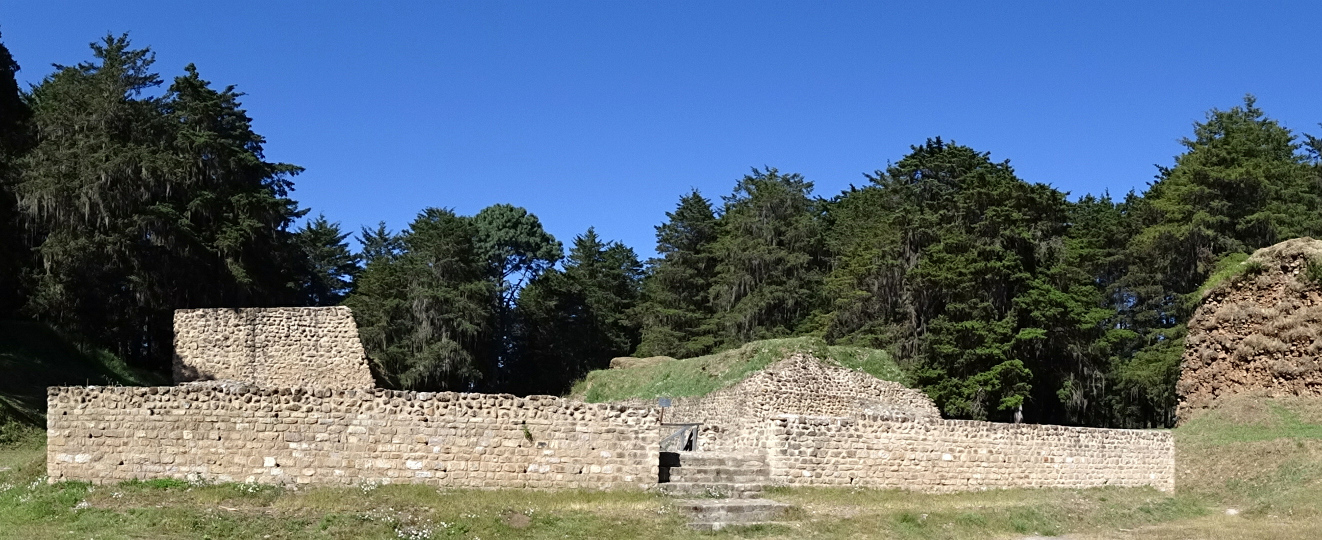
Restored central ballcourt of Qʼumarkaj, 2014

The Ballcourt lies close to, and just south of, the temple of Tohil, on the southwest side of the plaza. The ballcourt still retains its distinctive shape, although the structures have been robbed of their facing. The visible ballcourt was one of four in Qʼumarkaj and was administered by the Popol Winaq branch of the ruling Kaweq lineage. The ballcourt is aligned east–west with a length of 40 metres (130 ft). The ballcourt was located exactly between the palaces of the Kaweq and the Ajaw Kʼicheʼ, which were located 15 metres (49 ft) to the north and the south of the ballcourt. Correspondingly, the north range of the ballcourt appears to have been associated with the Kaweq lineage and the south range with the Ajaw Kʼicheʼ lineage.

=== Palaces ===
A small palace belonging to the Nijaib lineage was located directly behind the temple of Awilix. These lineage houses, nimja, are found throughout the city of Qʼumarkaj. As with the other buildings of the site, the outer stonework and plastering has been lost. The nimja are long rectangular structures located beside the plazas upon 1-metre (3.3 ft) high platforms. Upon these platforms, the palaces generally consisted of two levels, a lower roofed antechamber with a second, higher level supporting the main rooms of the structure. Some of the larger palaces had several stairways giving access to the antechamber, and multiple doors and pillars opening into the rooms of main building.

Another nimja palace structure lies to the southeast of the main plaza. Excavations in 1972 uncovered a simple superstructure consisting of a room with a bench at the back and an altar in the middle. Six funerary urns were found in the remains of the palace, one of which was found near the altar and contained rich offerings that included a gold necklace. There were traces of hearths at each extreme of the main chamber.

=== Other structures ===
In the central plaza there are traces of thirteen small platforms that once stood there. Three of these, each measuring 2.5 metres (8.2 ft) wide, were located to the north of the Temple of Kʼucumatz. A line of five similar structures was also located to the south of the same temple, with an alternating pattern of a circular platform, then a square platform, followed by another circular platform and so on. There was a sixth small platform nearby, which was square in shape. These platforms appear to have served as altars.

To the south of the line of platforms are the traces of two larger square platforms. One of these measured 10 metres (33 ft) on each side, the other measured 8 metres (26 ft) per side. A circular impression lies between these two platforms, which is all that remains of another platform, of a different type, that must have stood there. The larger platforms may also have served as auxiliary altars to those of the principle temples.

A large square platform in the northwest section of the central plaza, measuring 18 metres (59 ft) on each side, it is located immediately behind the Temple of Tohil and stands 2 metres (6.6 ft) high. Although, typically for the site, the outer stonework has been robbed, there are the remains of six layers of plaster on the floor of the platform's upper surface. This platform has been identified as the sokibʼal, the platform of gladiators described in early sources. This platform seems to have been closely linked to the military lineages of the Kaweq, such as the Nima Rajpop Achij.

Two large platforms lie in the southeastern section of the main plaza, their use remains unknown.

=== Caves ===
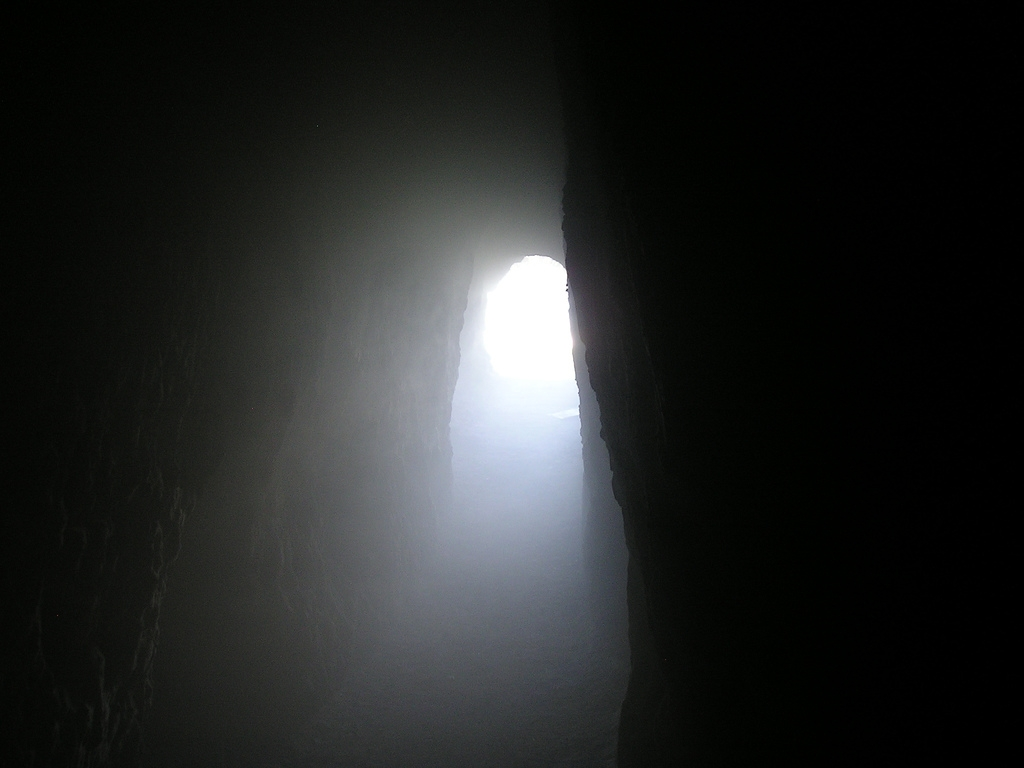
Smoke filled tunnel under the ruins of Qʼumarkaj.

In addition, a series of three caves tunnel straight into the limestone immediately to the north of the site. The first and most extensive cave is about 30 meters long with various altars carved into the rock inside. Some modern Quiché, although officially Roman Catholic, still burn candles and incense at the ruined temples. The caves may have represented Tulán Zuyuá, the "Place of Seven Caves" described in the Kʼicheʼ origin legend recounted in the Popul Vuh.

== Satellite sites ==
A number of other archaeological sites are included within the area of Greater Qʼumarkaj, usually referred to as 'Greater Utatlan'.

=== Chisalin ===
Chisalin is also known by the alternative names of Pilokabʼ and Muqwitz Pilokabʼ. Chisalin is located a few hundred meters north of Qʼumarkaj. The ruins are located on a narrow strip of land with an area of 110,000 square metres (1,200,000 sq ft) surrounded by steep ravines. On the northeast side the strip is connected to a plateau that forms a part of the plain to the east of Qʼumarkaj. Chisalin has a small, heavily eroded plaza, and the whole strip is occupied by ruins, with the exception of a small section.

=== Pismachiʼ ===
Pismachiʼ (sometimes referred to as Ismachiʼ) occupies a small plateau 600 metres (660 yd) south of the site core and is surrounded by steep ravines. The plateau is separated from the Qʼumarkaj plateau by the ravine containing the Ismachiʼ river. Pismachiʼ was the Kʼicheʼ capital before it was moved to nearby Qʼumarkaj, and was probably founded early in the 14th century. Its location was never forgotten by the local Kʼicheʼs, although it was from time to time lost by outside investigators. French missionary Charles Étienne Brasseur de Bourbourg located Pismachiʼ in the middle of the 19th century, it was then lost until it was relocated in 1956 by Jorge Guillemín, working in collaboration with the government of Guatemala, the location was reconfirmed by Robert Carmack in 1969. Although the Pismachiʼ plateau is twice the size of the Qʼumarkaj plateau, the ruins occupy a small area on the southeast portion of the hilltop. The ruins are still used for the rituals of modern Kʼicheʼ shamans.

=== Atalaya ===
Atalaya (Spanish for "watchtower") is located at a distance of 600 metres (660 yd) to the east of the site core. The site was built upon four terraces that dominated the approach to Qʼumarkaj, at the beginning of the eastern plain occupied by the modern town of Santa Cruz del Quiché. The site was very small, covering an area of 3,250 square metres (35,000 sq ft). A paved avenue (or sacbe) is said by locals to have passed the tower, which was closely linked to the Nijaib lineage. Between Qʼumarkaj and Atalaya there was a place where criminals were punished. Atalaya is used for modern Kʼicheʼ rituals and is the focus of local folklore, which relates that Tecún Umán is buried there and that it is haunted by tzitzimit spirits. Towards the end of the 20th century the majority of the land making up the site still belonged to the Rojas family, descendants of the kings of Qʼumarkaj.

=== Pakaman ===
Pakaman is located 1,000 metres (1,100 yd) east of Atalaya and 1.6 kilometres (1 mi) east of Qʼumarkaj. The same sakbe that passed the north side of Atalaya is said to pass south of Pakaman. The original name of Pakaman is likely to have been Panpetaq ("place of arrival") and was the first important outpost on the entry road to Qʼumarkaj.

== See also ==
- Cerro Quiac
- Chojolom
- Chutixtiox
