= WASP-22b =

Jovian size planet orbiting WASP-22

WASP-22b / Koyopaʼ
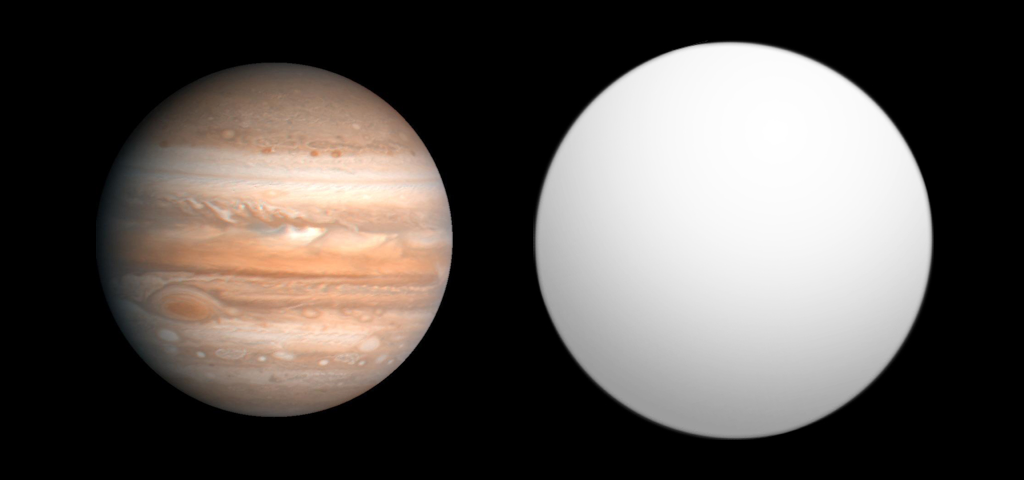
- A comparison between the sizes of WASP-22b (right) and Jupiter

Discovery
- Discovered by: Maxted, et al.
- Discovery site: South African Astronomical Observatory
- Discovery date: Published December 2010
- Detection method: Transit photometry

Orbital characteristics
- Epoch J2000
- Semi-major axis: 0.04698 (± 0.00037) AU
- Eccentricity: 0.0
- Orbital period (sidereal): 3.5327313 (± 5.8e-06) d
- Inclination: 88.26 (± 0.91)
- Star: WASP-22

Physical characteristics
- Mean radius: 1.199 R_{J}
- Mass: 0.617 M_{J}
- Temperature: 1298 K

WASP-22b, also named Koyopaʼ, is an extrasolar planet orbiting the Sun-like star WASP-22 320 parsecs (1,000 ly) in the constellation Eridanus. This hot Jupiter has an orbit of 3.53 days and a mass of 0.617 M_{J} and was detected by transit via SuperWASP. The system is a hierarchical triple system.

== Naming ==
In 2019 the IAU announced as part of NameExoWorlds that WASP-22 and its planet WASP-22b would be given official names chosen by school children from Guatemala. The star WASP-22 is named Tojil. Tojil is the name of one of the Mayan deities related to rain, storms, and fire. The planet WASP-22b is named Koyopaʼ. Koyopaʼ is the word associated with lightning in Kʼicheʼ (Quiché) Mayan language.

== Physical characteristics ==
The Rossiter-McLaughlin effect-based study in 2011 has determined the planetary orbit is slightly misaligned with the rotational axis of the parent star, with a reported angle of 22±16 degrees.
