= WASP-22 =

Star in the constellation Eridanus

Observation data Epoch J2000 Equinox ICRS
- Constellation: Eridanus
- Right ascension: 03^{h} 31^{m} 16.32671^{s}
- Declination: −23° 49′ 10.8406″
- Apparent magnitude (V): 11.99

Characteristics
- Evolutionary stage: main sequence
- Spectral type: G1V

Astrometry
Radial velocity (R_{v})	−5.67±0.50 km/s
Proper motion (μ)	RA: +2.012 mas/yr Dec.: −26.579 mas/yr
Parallax (π)	3.1532±0.0327 mas
Distance	1,030 ± 10 ly (317 ± 3 pc)

Details
Mass	1.109±0.026 M_{☉}
Radius	1.219+0.052 −0.033 R_{☉}
Surface gravity (log g)	4.310+0.020 −0.032 cgs
Temperature	5958±98 K
Metallicity [Fe/H]	+0.05±0.08 dex
Rotation	14±3 d
Rotational velocity (v sin i)	4.5±0.4 km/s
Age	4.3+1.6 −1.1 Gyr

Other designations
- Tojil, TOI-403, TIC 257567854, WASP-22, TYC 6446-326-1

Database references
SIMBAD	data
Exoplanet Archive	data

WASP-22, also named Tojil, is a G-type main-sequence star about 1,030 light-years (320 parsecs) away in the constellation Eridanus. With an apparent magnitude of 12, it is much too faint to be visible to the naked eye. The star is similar to the Sun, but slightly larger. It hosts two known exoplanets, WASP-22b and c.

== Nomenclature ==
The designation WASP-22 comes from the Wide Angle Search for Planets. This was one of the systems selected to be named in the 2019 NameExoWorlds campaign during the 100th anniversary of the IAU, which assigned each country a star and planet to be named. This system was assigned to Guatemala. The approved names were Tojil for the star, after a Mayan deity related to rain, storms and fire, and Koyopaʼ for planet b, the word for lightning in the Kʼicheʼ language.

== Planetary system ==
The planet WASP-22b, later named Koyopaʼ, is a hot Jupiter, about half the mass of Jupiter but with a larger radius, discovered in 2010 by the Wide Angle Search for Planets using the transit method. Its orbit is prograde but may be slightly misaligned with the star's equator.

A long-period trend in the star's radial velocity indicated a third body in the system; this was confirmed as a second planet, WASP-22c, in 2026. It is a super-Jupiter with an eccentric orbit.

The WASP-22 planetary system
Companion (in order from star)	Mass	Semimajor axis (AU)	Orbital period (days)	Eccentricity	Inclination (°)	Radius
b / Koyopaʼ	0.570+0.017 −0.016 M_{J}	0.04700+0.00036 −0.00037	3.5327313(58)	<0.021	88.26±0.91	1.158+0.061 −0.038 R_{J}
c	≥4.90+0.99 −0.86 M_{J}	3.76+0.40 −0.29	2541+37 −30	0.461+0.028 −0.032	—	—
