= Feathered Serpent =

Mesoamerican concept

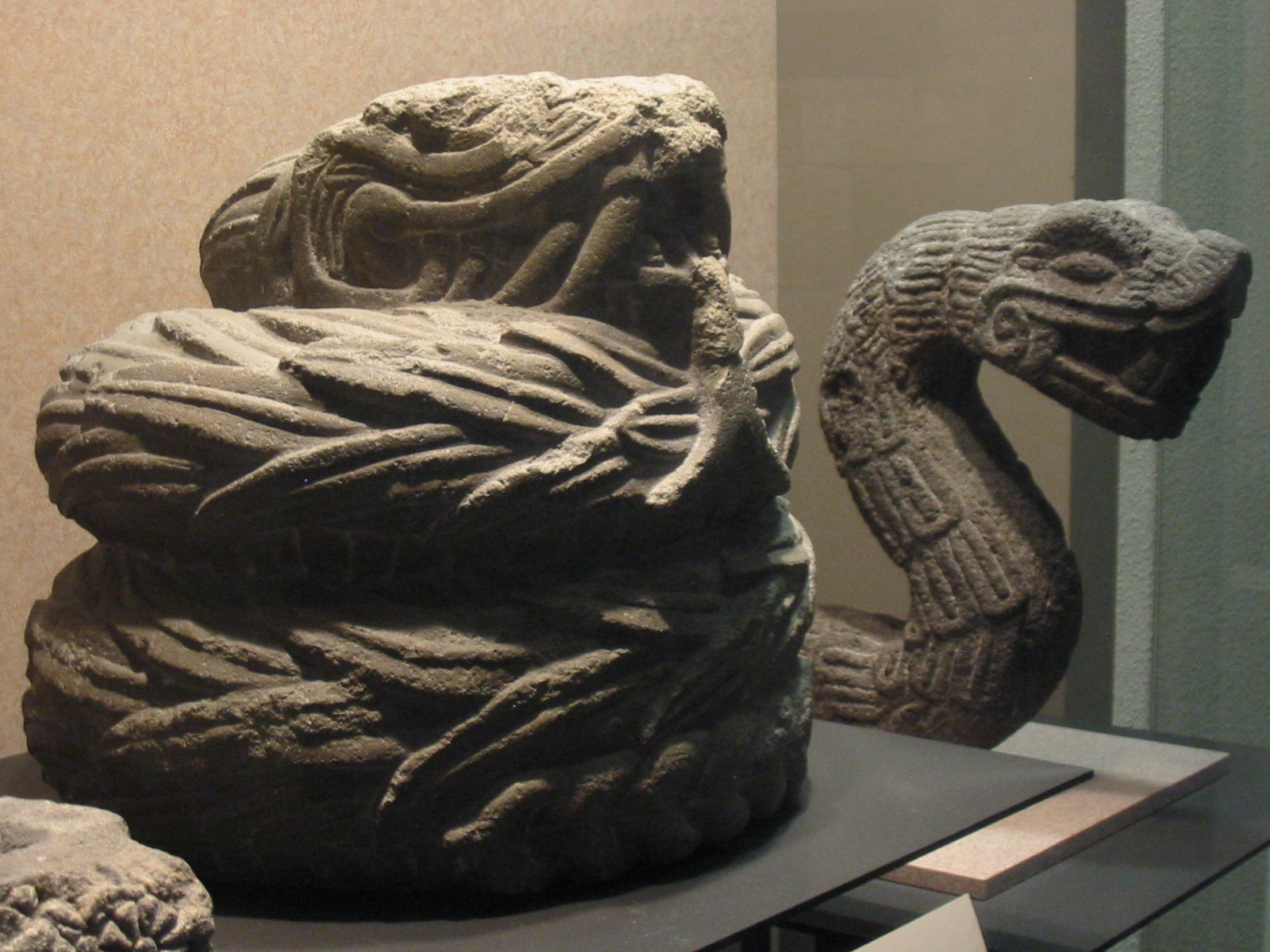
Aztec era stone sculptures of feathered serpents on display at the National Museum of Anthropology in Mexico City

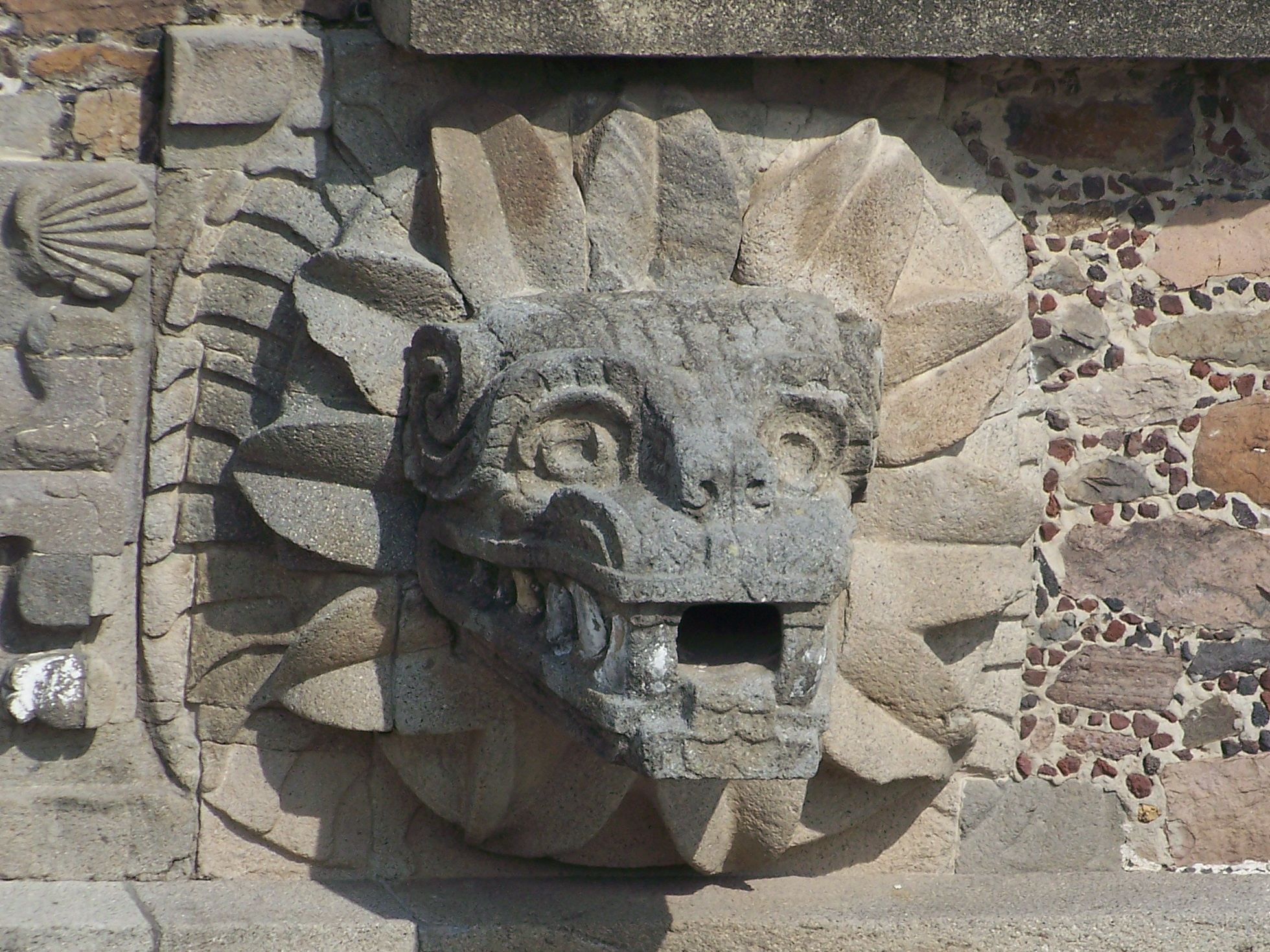
Feathered Serpent heads cover the Temple of the Feathered Serpent, Teotihuacan.

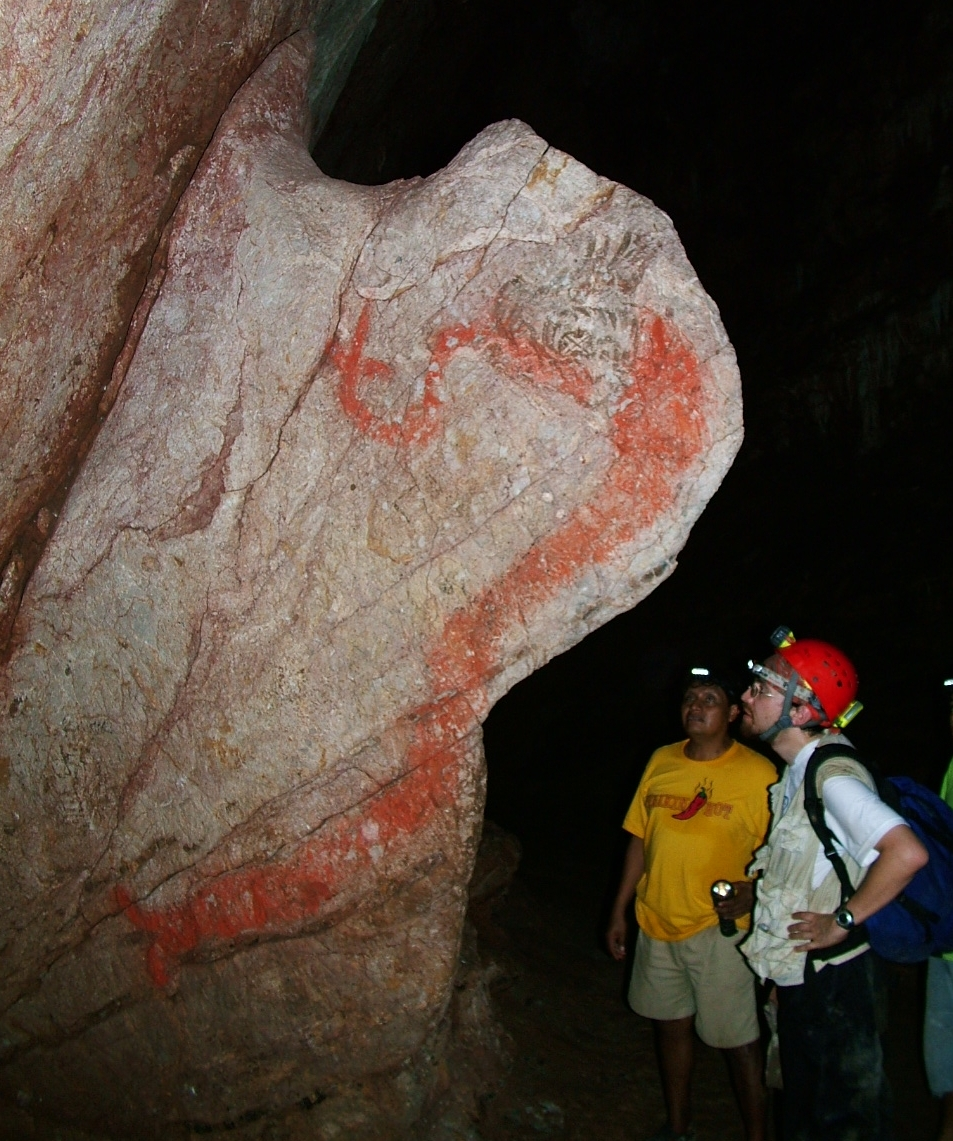
A Feathered Serpent deep in the Juxtlahuaca cave. Stylistically tied to the Olmec, this red Feathered Serpent has a crest of now-faded green feathers.

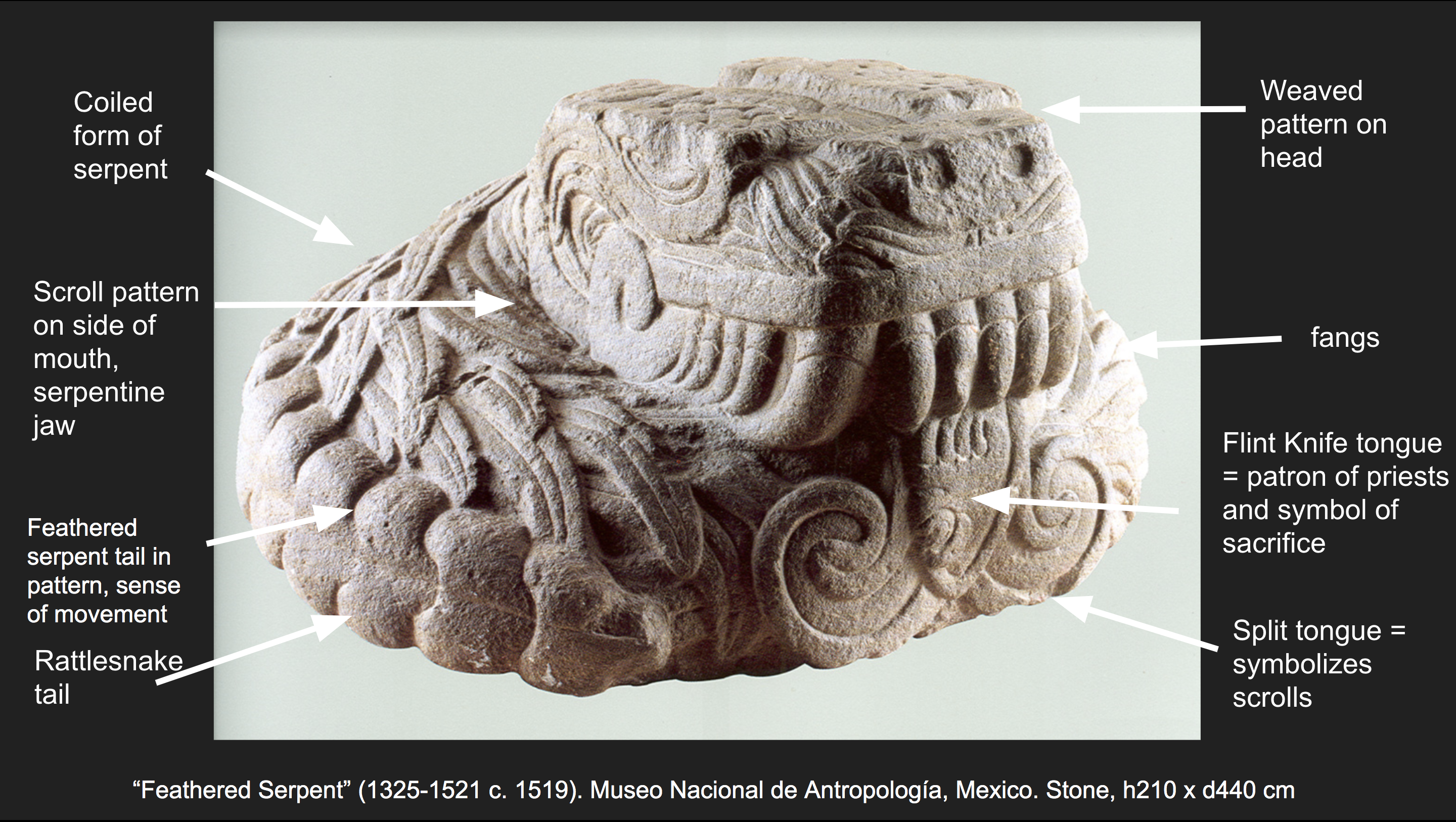

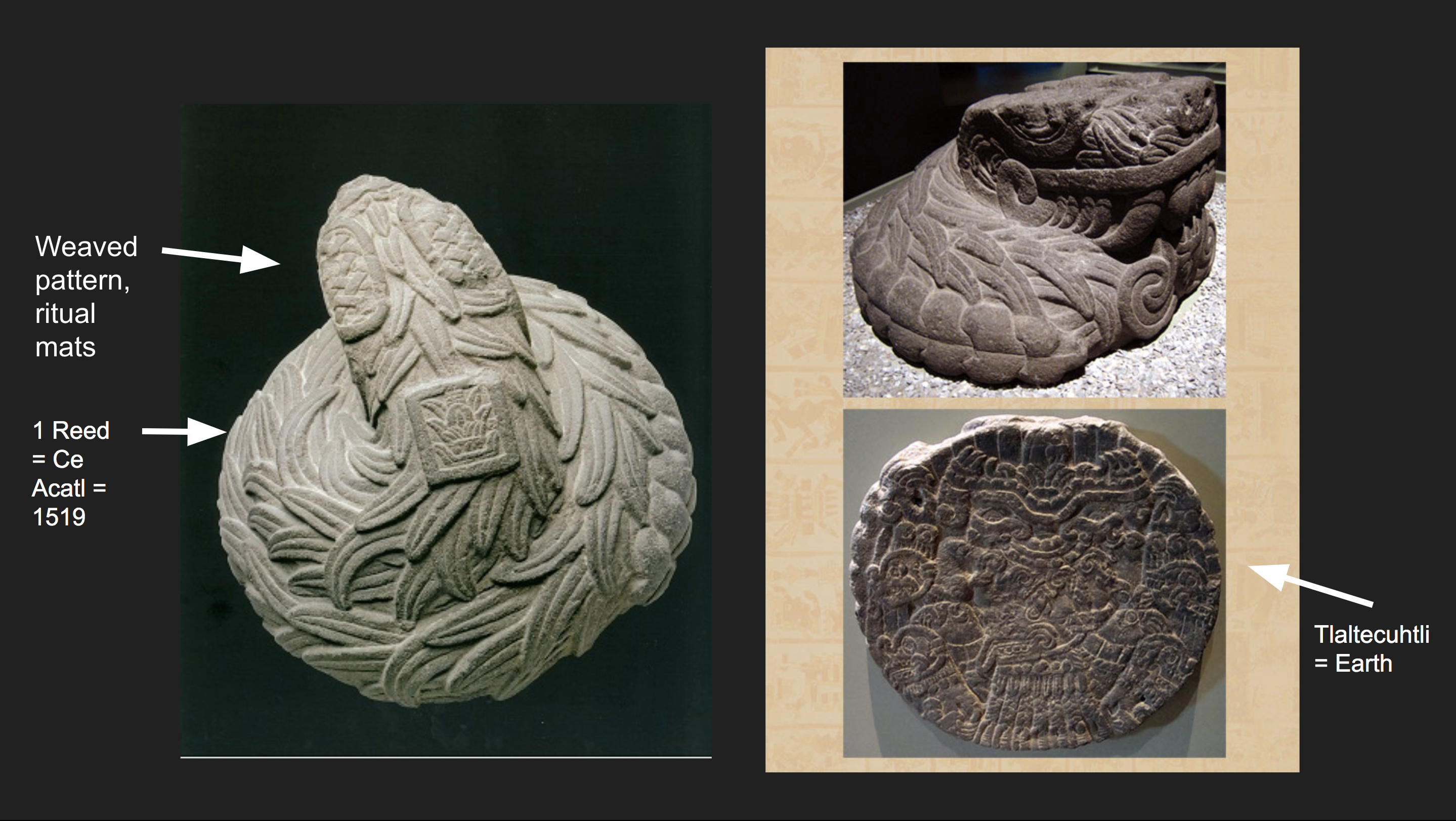
Annotated image of the Feathered Serpent or Plumed Serpent Sculpture from the top and bottom. It is currently on display at the National Museum of Anthropology in Mexico City.

The Feathered Serpent is a prominent supernatural entity or deity found in many Mesoamerican religions. It is called Quetzalcōātl among the Aztecs; Kukulkan among the Yucatec Maya; and Qʼuqʼumatz and Tohil among the Kʼicheʼ Maya.

The double symbolism used by the Feathered Serpent is considered allegorical to the dual nature of the deity: being feathered represents its divine nature or ability to fly to reach the skies, while being a serpent represents its human nature or ability to creep on the ground among other animals of the Earth, a dualism very common in Mesoamerican deities.

== Description ==
Representations of feathered serpents appear in the Olmec culture (c. 1400–400 BC). The Olmec culture predates the Maya and the Aztec. This cultural enclave extended from the Gulf of Mexico to Nicaragua. Most surviving representations in Olmec art, such as Monument 19 at La Venta, and a painting in the Juxtlahuaca cave (see below), show the Feathered Serpent as a crested rattlesnake, sometimes with feathers covering the body and legs, and often close to humans. It is believed that Olmec supernatural entities such as the feathered serpent were the forerunners of many later Mesoamerican deities, although experts disagree on the feathered serpent's religious importance to the Olmec. H.B. Nicholson notes that as early as the Middle Formative (Preclassic) in the Olmec tradition, images of serpents with avian characteristics were often represented in several types of artifacts and monuments. This composite creature, who has been denominated the “Avian Serpent” and “Olmec God VII,” appears to constitute an earlier form of the later full-fledged Feathered Serpent, the rattlesnake covered with feathers, probably with at least some of the same celestial and fertility connotations.

The pantheon of the people of Teotihuacan (200 BC – 700 AD) also featured a feathered serpent, shown most prominently on the Temple of the Feathered Serpent (dated 150–200 AD). The pyramid was built southeast of the intersection of the avenue of the dead and the east-end avenue. Several feathered serpent representations appear on the building, many of them including full-body profiles and feathered serpent heads. The sculptures utilize practices such as relief carving to create complex ornate compositions. Head carvings of the Feathered Serpent have been frequently found around the Pyramid of the Feathered Serpent.

While the feathered serpent has been a common theme in different Mesoamerican works, it is frequently and most commonly reflected in the architecture of Mesoamerican culture. Some common techniques used to incorporate imagery of the Feathered Serpent into this architecture is relief carving, which involves “a sculpture with figures that protrude from a background while still being attached to it” and normally combined with tenoned heads, which are large pieces of stone carved but have a peg of sorts to insert them into the wall area, adding more depth and details to the architecture. Other Mesoamerican structures, such as the ones in Tula, the capital of the later Toltecs (950–1150 AD), also featured profiles of feathered serpents.

The Aztec feathered serpent deity known as Quetzalcoatl is known from several Aztec codices, such as the Florentine codex, as well as from the records of the Spanish conquistadors. Quetzalcoatl was known as the deity of wind and rain, the bringer of knowledge, the inventor of books, and associated with the planet Venus.

Feathered serpent columns at the Temple of the Warriors in Chichen Itza. This style of column is associated with the Toltecs and is representative of the Central Mexican influence on the Maya city.

The corresponding Maya god Kukulkan was rare in the Classic era Maya civilization. However, in the Popol Vuh, the K'iche' feathered serpent god Tepeu Q'uq'umatz is the creator of the cosmos.

Along with the feathered serpent deity, several other serpent gods existed in the pantheon of Mesoamerican gods with similar traits, all of which had an important role in the cultural development of Mesoamerican cultures. The evidence of the importance of these deities to Mesoamerican culture lies in the architecture left from these civilizations and the rituals surrounding them.

== See also ==
- Awanyu
- Horned Serpent
- Serpent (symbolism)
- Loong
- Xiuhcoatl
- Amaru (mythology)
- Ketu
- Mbói Tu'ĩ
- Piuchén
