= Jacawitz =

Deity

Jacawitz ([χäkäˈwits]) (also spelt Jakawitz, Jakawits, Qʼaqʼawits and Hacavitz) was a mountain god of the Postclassic Kʼicheʼ Maya of highland Guatemala. He was the patron of the Ajaw Kʼicheʼ lineage and was a companion of the sun god Tohil. It is likely that he received human sacrifice. The word jacawitz means "mountain" in the lowland Maya language, and the word qʼaqʼawitz of the highland Maya means "fire mountain", which suggests that Jacawitz was mainly a fire deity, much like Tohil. In the Mam language, the similar word xqʼaqwitz means "yellow wasp" and the wasp was an important symbol of the deity and its associated lineage. In the Cholan languages, jacawitz means "first mountain", linking the god with the first mountain of creation.

In the Kʼicheʼ epic Popul Vuh, the first people gathered at the mythical place Tollan to receive their gods, and Mahucutah, one of the gathered Kʼicheʼ lords, received Jacawitz. The mid-9th century Stela 8 at the Terminal Classic lowland Maya site of Seibal describes a visitor to the city named Hakawitzil. This is an early spelling of Jacawitz and Mayanists Linda Schele and Peter Mathews have proposed that the event depicted on this stela gave rise to the foundation legends of the Kʼicheʼ. As well as being mentioned frequently in the Popul Vuh, Jacawitz is also mentioned in the Kʼicheʼ document Título de los Señores de Totonicapán.

Jacawitz was one of a triad of Kʼicheʼ deities, the other two being Tohil and the goddess Awilix, all three were sometimes collectively referred to as Tohil, the principal member of the triad. The concept of a trinity of deities was an ancient one in Maya culture, dating back to the Preclassic period.

== Temple of Jacawitz ==
The Ahaw Kʼicheʼ were the founding lineage of the Kʼicheʼ Maya, although they later lost power to the Kaweq lineage; as they lost status within the kingdom, so did their patron god. The temple of Jacawitz at the Kʼicheʼ capital of Qʼumarkaj was one of the three tallest buildings in the city, although it faced away from the main plaza. The temple is a large mound south of the plaza, its stonework has been stripped away making its original form uncertain, although a 19th-century plan of the city recorded it as a pyramid. This pyramid temple was part of a complex that consisted of a patio enclosed by the temple on the northern side, a palace on the south side and a long building on the east. The Jakawitz temple complex has not yet been investigated archaeologically. The 19th century drawings by Miguel Rivera y Maestre suggest that the temple was a narrow building with four or five terraces.
