= Tohil =

Deity

Tohil (IPA: [toˈχil], also spelled Tojil) is the Maya god of fire. He is a deity of the Kʼicheʼ Maya in the Late Postclassic period of Mesoamerica.

At the time of the Spanish Conquest, Tohil was the patron god of the Kʼicheʼ. He was included in the Tolteca pantheon that was influenced in the highlands Maya culture in the Postclassic Period. Tohil's principal function was that of a fire deity and he was also both a war god, sun god and the god of rain. Tohil was also associated with mountains and he was a god of war, sacrifice and sustenance. In the Kʼicheʼ epic Popul Vuh, after the first people were created, they gathered at the mythical Tollan or Tula, the Place of the Seven Caves, to receive their language and their gods. The Kʼicheʼ, and others, there received Tohil. Tohil demanded blood sacrifice from the Kʼicheʼ and so they offered their own blood and also that of sacrificed captives taken in battle. In the Popul Vuh this consumption of blood by Tohil is likened to the suckling of an infant by its mother.

Tohil was originally part of the Tolteca pantheon and was introduced in Postclassic Maya culture. He has been compared to the same god Qʼuqʼumatz, and shared attributes of the feathered serpent with that deity, but they later diverged and each deity came to have a separate priesthood. Sculptures of a human face emerging between the jaws of a serpent were common from the end of the Classic Period through to the Late Postclassic and may represent Qʼuqʼumatz in the act of carrying Hunahpu, the youthful avatar of the sun god Tohil, across the sky. The god's association with human sacrifice meant that Tohil was one of the first deities that the Spanish clergy tried to eradicate after the conquest of Guatemala.

Indeed, it's known that the Kaqchikel tribe was against the human sacrifice demanded by Tohil to bring them fire. For this reason they stole the fire from the deity — Kaqchikel means “fire thieves.” This is the principal cause of enmity between the K'iche and Kaqchikel peoples.

== Attributes ==
Tohil's deriving from the word toh ("rain") and as meaning "tribute" or "payment". Tohil was one of a trinity of gods worshipped by the Kʼicheʼ elite, together with Awilix and Jacawitz. The concept of a triad of deities was ancient in Maya religion, dating as far back as the Late Preclassic. The triad of Kʼicheʼ gods were sometimes referred to collectively as Tohil. Tohil has been equated with the Classic Period God K. The deity also possesses attributes that suggest a link with Mixcoatl, a hunting god of the Aztecs.

Tohil was the patron deity of the Kaweq lineage of the Kʼicheʼ. He was associated with a sacred deerskin bundle that was said to embody him, and one of his titles was Qajawal Kej ("Our Lord Deer"). The deity was associated with thunder, lightning and the sunrise.

== Worship ==
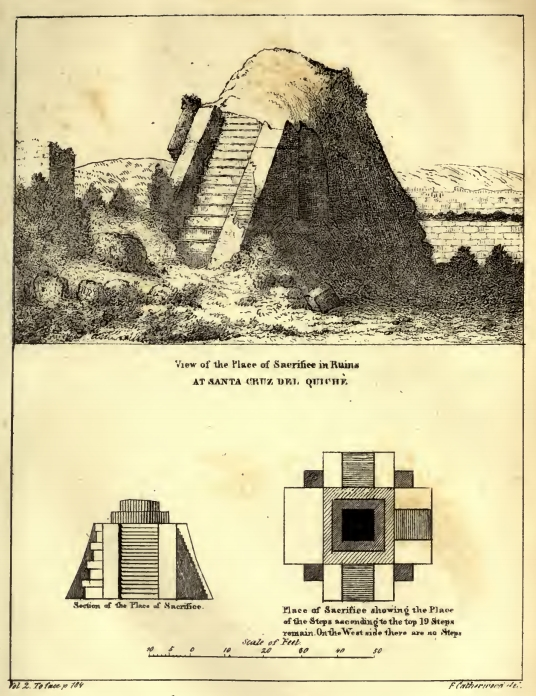
Drawing of the Temple of Tohil at the former Kʼicheʼ capital of Qʼumarkaj, by Frederick Catherwood, published in 1841

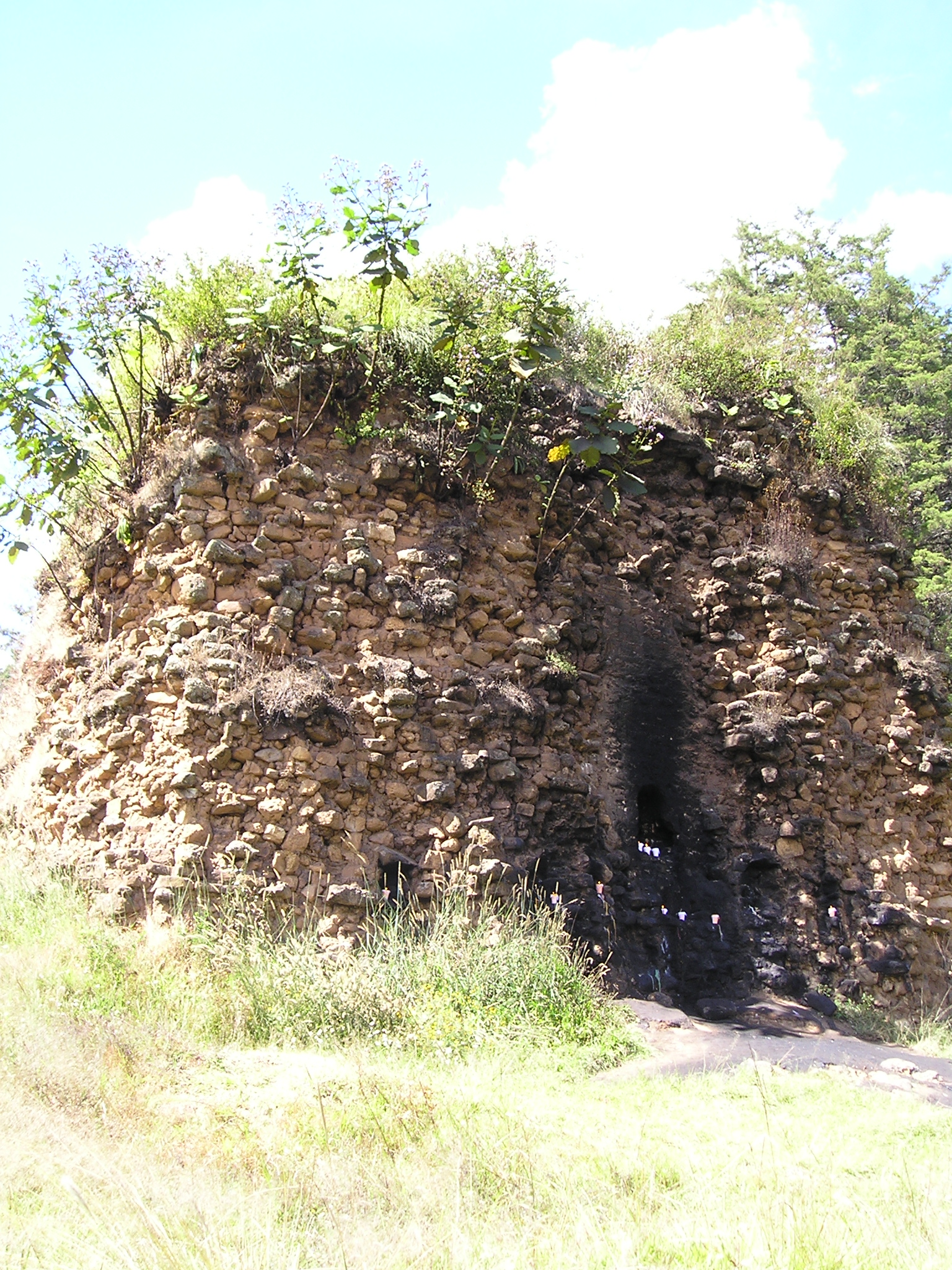
The ruins of the Temple of Tohil as they appeared in 2006.

The Kaweq lineage of the Kʼicheʼ built a temple to Tohil at their first capital Jacawitz, identified as the archaeological site of Chitinamit. Jacawitz was overlooked by a shrine to the god placed on a neighbouring peak, this shrine was known as Pa Tohil. Later the Kʼicheʼ built their main temple to Tohil at Qʼumarkaj, their new capital. They made him offerings on the day Toh, one of the days of their 20-day calendar cycle. The Kʼicheʼ performed the Great Dance of Tohil in honour of the deity in the month of Tzʼikin Qʼij, prior to the maize harvest (which takes place in November). This dance took place at Qʼumarkaj and involved a gathering of all the principal lineages subject to the Kʼicheʼ Kingdom of Qʼumarkaj, and as is described in the Kʼicheʼ chronicle Título de Totonicapán, they were expected to bring tribute, slaves and sacrifices.

The priests of Tohil were known as Aj Tohil and were selected from the ruling Kaweq lineage of Qʼumarkaj. During their ceremonies to Tohil, the Kʼicheʼ would offer quetzal feathers to the god. Writing at the end of the 17th century, Francisco Ximénez described the tradition that upon the temple human sacrifices were tied before the representation of Tohil, where the priest would open the victim's chest and cut out his heart. After sacrifice, the victim's body was probably hurled down the front stairway of the temple where his head would be severed to be placed on a skull rack that was located in front of the temple.

Equivalents to Tohil were worshipped by other groups closely related to the Kʼicheʼ. These included Belehe Toh of the Kaqchikels and Hun Toh of the Rabinal, this last name meaning "One Rain", a calendrical date. The Kaqchikel and the Rabinal did not merely think their own patrons were equivalent to Tohil, they claimed that they were the same deity under a different name. The Kʼicheʼ themselves claimed in the Popul Vuh that their patron Tohil was the same as Quetzalcoatl of the Aztecs.

=== Temple of Tohil ===
The Temple of Tohil at Qʼumarkaj was the tallest structure in the city. The rubble core of the building still stands but the stone facing has been looted. The temple was originally a pyramid with stairways on all four sides, the summit shrine faced towards the rising sun in the east. This form of radial pyramid temple was built by the Maya since the Late Preclassic with examples at many archaeological sites such as Tikal, Copán and Chichen Itza, among others. According to John Lloyd Stephens, who visited the site in the 1830s, the temple base measured 66 feet (20 m) square and it stood 33 feet (10 m) high. At that time the radial stairways were more-or-less intact. The temple was originally covered in painted stucco, with the decoration including the painted image of a jaguar.

== Modern worship ==
Deerskins, the symbol of Tohil, are to this day venerated in many highland Maya communities and are used in dances. In the modern village of Santiago Atitlán in the Guatemalan highlands, a traditional Maya priesthood performs rites to a powerful deity addressed as "King Martin, Lord of the Three Levels, Lord of Rain, Lord of Maize, and Lord of all the Mountains". This priest blesses deerskins prior them being worn, with head and antlers attached, during the Dance of Martin on November 11 prior to the maize harvest. King Martin is probably a blend of Tohil and his deerskin bundle with the Roman Catholic St Martin of Tours, whose feast falls on the same day. In Rabinal, Tohil was merged with St Paul while still retaining many of his characteristics.

== See also ==
- Kinich Ahau
- Fire god
- Xiuhtecuhtli Mayan equivalent
