= Tepeu =

Tepeu is a word of the Kʼicheʼ Maya language meaning "sovereign" (also "one who conquers" or "one who is victorious"). The title is associated with the god Qʼuqʼumatz of the Kʼicheʼ-Maya, one of the creation gods of the Popol Vuh; his whole name translating as "Sovereign Plumed Serpent". The title has also been used by numerous Kʼicheʼ rulers such as Tepepul.

The word originated from the Nahuatl Tepeuh.
