= Kukulkan =

Serpent deity in Mesoamerican mythology

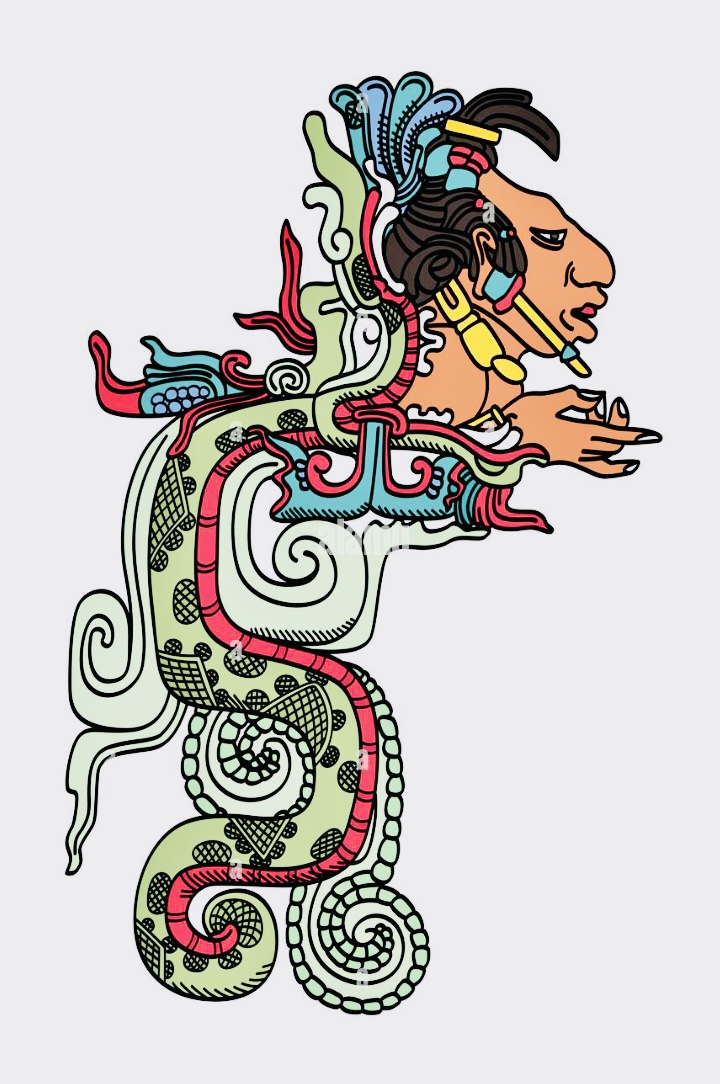
- Reconstructed 2D-portrait of Kukulkan
- Major cult center: Chichen Itza
- Symbol: Serpent

Equivalents
- Aztec: Quetzalcoatl
- Inca: Viracocha
- Lenca: Managuara

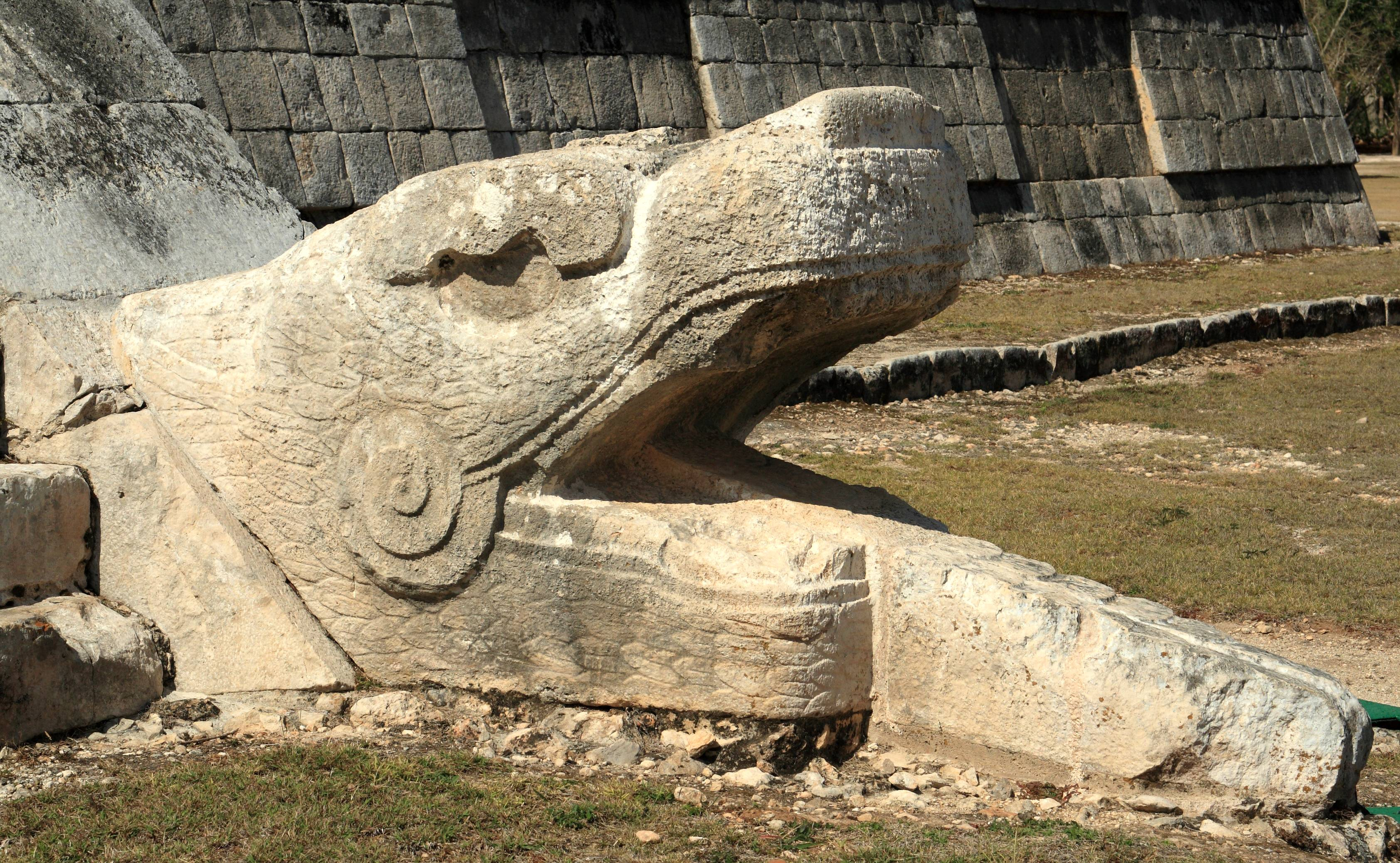
Kukulkan at the base of the west face of the northern stairway of El Castillo, Chichen Itza

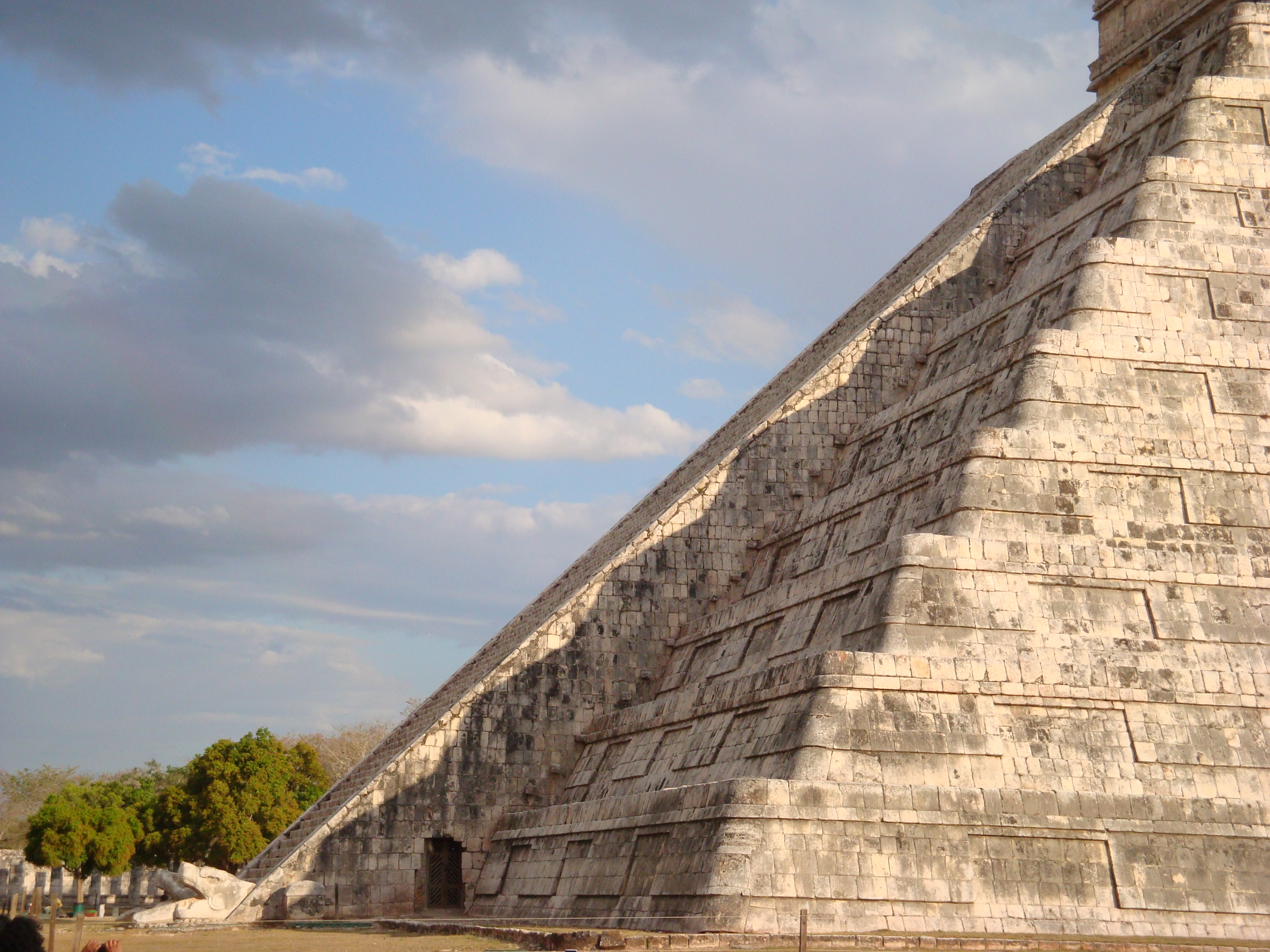
Kukulkan at Chichen Itza during the Equinox

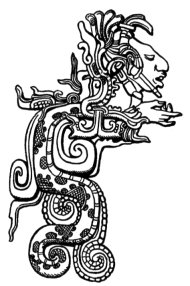
The Classic Maya vision serpent, as depicted at Yaxchilan

Kukulkan, also spelled K’uk’ulkan (/kuːkʊlˈkɑːn/; lit. 'Plumed Serpent', 'Amazing Serpent'), is the serpent deity of Maya mythology. It is closely related to the deity Qʼuqʼumatz of the Kʼicheʼ people and to Quetzalcoatl of Aztec mythology. Prominent temples to Kukulkan are found at archaeological sites in the Yucatán Peninsula, such as Chichen Itza, Uxmal and Mayapan.

The depiction of the Feathered Serpent is present in other cultures of Mesoamerica. Although heavily Mexicanised, Kukulkan has its origins among the Maya of the Classic Period. Little is known of the mythology of this Pre-Columbian era deity.

== Etymology ==
In the Yucatec Maya language, the name is spelt Kʼukʼulkan (/kʼuː kʼuːlˈkän/) and in Tzotzil it is Kʼukʼul-chon (/kʼuːˈkʼuːl tʃʰon/). The Yucatec form of the name is formed from the word kuk "feather" with the adjectival suffix -ul, giving kukul "feathered", combined with kan "snake" (Tzotzil chon), giving a literal meaning of "feathered snake". In the Chol-Ch'orti'-Tzeltal family of languages, Kukulcan is Kukulchon. In Ch'orti', Kukulchon is kuk k'ur chon.

Kukulkan has its origins among the Maya of the Classic Period, when it was known as Waxaklahun Ubah Kan (/waʃaklaˈχuːn uːˈɓaχ kän/), the War Serpent. It has been identified also as the Postclassic version of the Vision Serpent of Classic Maya art.

== History ==
The cult of Kukulkan/Quetzalcoatl was the first Mesoamerican religion to transcend the old Classic Period linguistic and ethnic divisions. This cult facilitated communication and peaceful trade among peoples of many different social and ethnic backgrounds. Although the cult was originally centred on the ancient city of Chichen Itza in the modern Mexican state of Yucatán, it spread as far as the Guatemalan Highlands and northern Belize.

In Yucatán, references to the deity Kukulkan are confused by references to a historical individual who bore the name of the god. Because of this, the distinction between the two has become blurred. This individual appears to have been a ruler or priest at Chichen Itza who first appeared around the 10th century. Although Kukulkan was mentioned as a historical person by Maya writers of the 16th century, the earlier 9th-century texts at Chichen Itza never identified him as human and artistic representations depicted him as a Vision Serpent entwined around the figures of nobles. At Chichen Itza, Kukulkan is also depicted presiding over sacrifice scenes.

=== Kukulkan and the Itza ===
Kukulkan was a deity closely associated with the Itza state in the northern Yucatán Peninsula, where the religion formed the core of the Territorial religion. Although the worship of Kukulkan had its origins in earlier Maya traditions, the Itza worship of Kukulkan was heavily influenced by the Quetzalcoatl religion of central Mexico. This influence probably arrived via Putún Maya merchants from the Gulf Coast of Mexico. These Chontal merchants probably actively promoted the feathered serpent worshipers throughout Mesoamerica. Kukulkan headed a pantheon of deities of mixed Maya and non-Maya provenance, used to promote the Itza political and commercial agenda. It also eased the passage of Itza merchants into central Mexico and other non-Maya areas, promoting the Itza economy.

At Chichen Itza, Kukulkan ceased to be the Vision Serpent that served as a messenger between the king and the gods and came instead to symbolise the divinity of the territory.

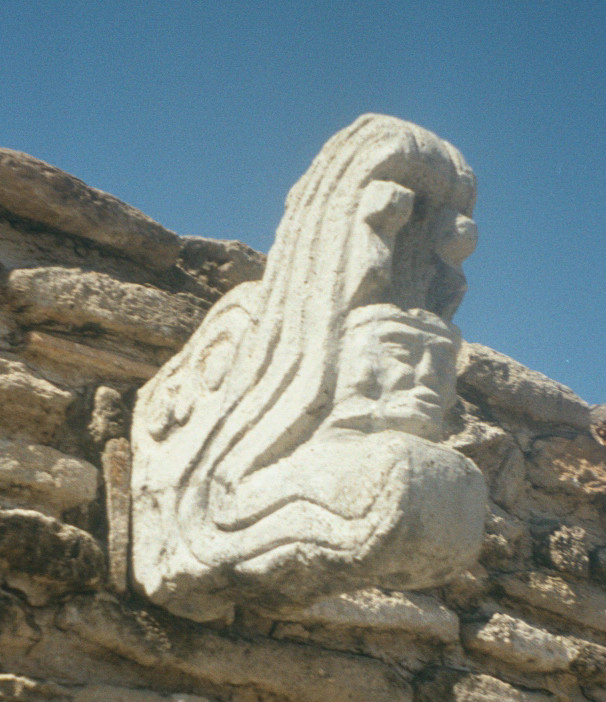
Ballcourt marker from the Postclassic site of Mixco Viejo in Guatemala. This sculpture depicts Kukulkan, jaws agape, with the head of a human warrior emerging from his maw.

El Castillo, Chichen Itza served as a temple to Kukulkan. During the spring and fall equinoxes the shadow cast by the angle of the sun and edges of the nine steps of the pyramid combined with the northern stairway and the stone serpent head carvings create the illusion of a massive serpent descending the pyramid.

After the fall of Chichen Itza, the nearby Postclassic city of Mayapan became the centre of the revived Kukulkan worshipers, with temples decorated with feathered serpent columns. At the time of the Spanish colonization, the high priest of Kukulkan was the family patriarch of the Xiu faction and was one of the two most powerful men in the city.

The religion of Kukulkan spread as far as the Guatemalan Highlands and northern Belize, where Postclassic feathered serpent sculptures are found with open mouths from which protrude the heads of human warriors.

== Modern folklore ==
Stories are still told about Kukulkan among the modern Yucatec Maya. In one tale, Kukulkan is a boy who was born as a snake. As he grew older it became obvious that he was the plumed serpent and his sister cared for him in a cave. He grew to such a size that his sister was unable to continue feeding him, so he flew out of his cave and into the sea, causing an earthquake. To let his sister know that he is still alive, Kukulkan causes earth tremors every year in July.

A modern collection of folklore from Yucatán tells how Kukulkan was a winged serpent that flew to the sun and tried to speak to it but the sun, in its pride, burnt his tongue. The same source relates how Kukulkan always travels ahead of the Yucatec Maya rain god Chaac, helping to predict the rains as his tail moves the winds and sweeps the earth clean.

Among the Lacandon Maya of Chiapas, Kukulkan is an evil, monstrous snake that is the pet of the sun god. She destroys much of the world until she tries to herself during the long trip—the trip between the life and death. During the trip, she meets a boy who shares food with her and follows her back to the human world. She returns with him and constructs her own country.

== In popular culture ==
In the 1963 comic book X-Men #25-26, a character named El Tigre finds a cursed pendant while robbing a Mayan temple which promises him power if he finds the missing half. Although he succeeds in doing so, reconstructing the pendant causes him to become possessed by the Mayan deity Kukulcan.

In Star Trek: The Animated Series, episode "How Sharper Than a Serpent's Tooth", the starship Enterprise encounters an ancient alien being that appears as a winged serpent and claims to be the Kukulkan of the ancient Mayan and Aztec cultures.

In the 2002 video game Serious Sam: The Second Encounter, Kukulkan serves as a guardian of the time portal in Teotihuacan and is fought as that game's first boss.

In the 2006 film Apocalypto, the high priest in charge of human sacrifice prays to Kukulkan.

In the 2013 video game Invizimals: The Lost Kingdom, Kukulkan is a playable character that can be purchased with in-game credits.

In the 2018 video game Shadow of the Tomb Raider, the main antagonist Dominguez/Amaru, who has usurped the throne of a hidden city founded by Mayan refugees in Peru, claims to be an incarnation of Kukulkan and seeks a pair of artifacts that will grant him the god's power.

In the 2021 video game Genshin Impact, Kukulkan is one of the names for the Sage of the Stolen Flame, a dragon prince who stole Phlogiston from the dragons and taught humans how to use it.

In the 2022 Marvel Cinematic Universe film Black Panther: Wakanda Forever, the king of Talokan, Namor (played by Tenoch Huerta Mejía), is also referred to as K'uk'ulkan by his subjects.

== See also ==
- Chichen Itza, a pre-Columbian Maya city
- Kukulcania, a genus of crevice weaver spiders named in honor of this god.
