= Mam (Maya mythology) =

Reverential term in Maya mythology

Mam (Mayan pronunciation: [mam], 'grandfather' or 'grandson') is a pan-Maya kinship term as well as a term of respect referring to ancestors and deities. In Classic period inscriptions, the word mam appears to be used mainly to introduce the name of a grandfather, grandson, or ancestor, often a king. Ethnographically, Mam refers to several aged Maya deities:

- (i) In Kekchi-speaking Belize, 'Mam' is a general designation for the mountain spirits; four Mams were specifically associated with the four corners of the earth (see Bacab).
- (ii) In the Kekchi-speaking Alta Verapaz of Guatemala, one of the Mams is a greatly feared mountain spirit associated with earthquakes and inundations. An image of this Mam was apparently buried during the Holy Week.
- (iii) Among the Huaxtec Mayas (Huastec people), the Mams or Mamlabs are earth deities; there are three or four of them, the most important one (Muxiʼ) being the violent originator of the rainy season.
- (iv) Among the Tzutujil Mayas of Santiago Atitlán, the Mam Maximón is a deity of merchants and travellers and of witchcraft. Assimilated to Judas, he is especially venerated during the last days of the Holy Week, and discarded afterwards.
- (v) In 16th-century Yucatán, 'Mam' was also the designation of a straw puppet set up and venerated during the five unlucky days (Uayeb) at the end of the year (Cogolludo), when witchcraft was thought to be prevalent; at the conclusion of this period, the straw figure was discarded.

The Mayanist J.E.S. Thompson referred to Mam (ii) as the evil Mam, an unfelicitous term redolent of Judaeo-Christian dichotomies. Thompson further believed the Mams (ii), (iv) and (v) to represent the same deity.

The Mams are likely to have had their counterparts within the small Classic Maya group of aged deities consisting of God D (Itzamna), the various representatives of God N (Bacab), and God L. A corresponding concept in Aztec religion would be Huehueteotl ('old god', 'ancient god').
