= Maya jaguar gods =

Mayan deities

The pre-Columbian Maya religion distinguished various jaguar gods, in addition to jaguar demi-gods, (ancestral) protectors, and shapeshifters. The main jaguar deities are discussed below. Their associated narratives (part of Maya mythology) are still largely to be reconstructed. Lacandon and Tzotzil-Tzeltal oral tradition are particularly rich in jaguar lore.

== The Jaguar God of Terrestrial Fire and War ('Night Sun') ==
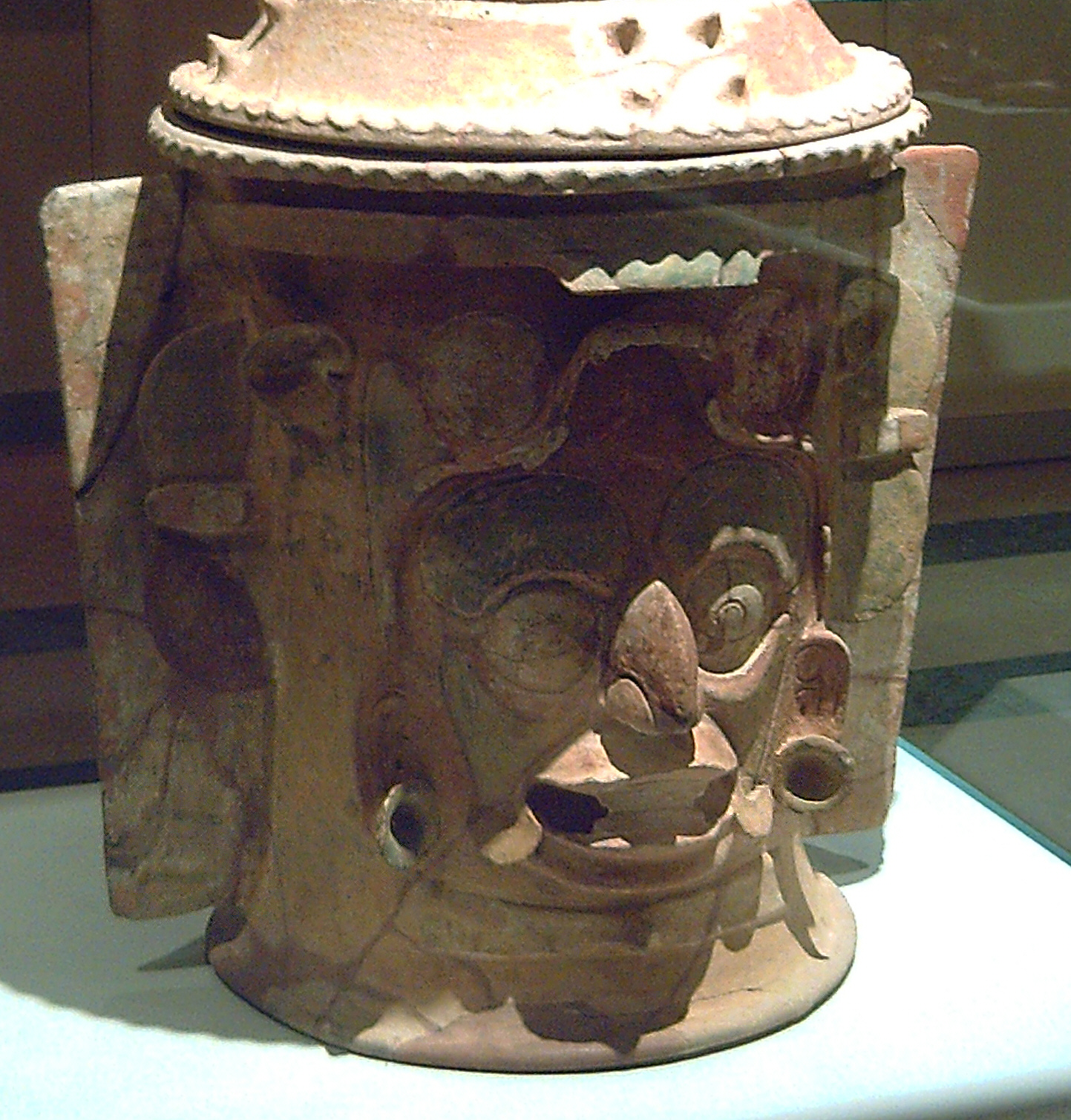
Jaguar God of Terrestrial Fire on a burial urn, Late-Classic period

The Jaguar God of Terrestrial Fire is recognizable by a 'cruller' around the eyes (making a loop over the nose), jaguar ears, and fangs. He personifies the number seven, which is associated with the day Akʼbʼal ('Night'). Usually called 'Jaguar God of the Underworld', he has been assumed to be the 'Night Sun' - the shape supposedly taken by the sun (Kinich Ahau) during his nightly journey through the underworld - by reason of having the large eyes and filed incisors that also occur with the sun deity, and of sometimes evincing a k 'in infix. The deity's hypothetical aspect of a nocturnal sun (that is, a subterranean fire) should perhaps be connected to his proven association with terrestrial fire. He is often represented on incense burners and connected to fire rituals, while his 'cruller' may represent a cord used in making fire with a stick (Taube). Moreover, vases in codical style show him, captured, about to be burnt with torches. The nocturnal sun hypothesis is complicated by this very incident, and even more so by the fact that the fiery jaguar deity is identified with a star (or perhaps a constellation or planet). The god's other sphere of influence is war, witness for example the stereotypical presence of his face on war shields.

== God L ==
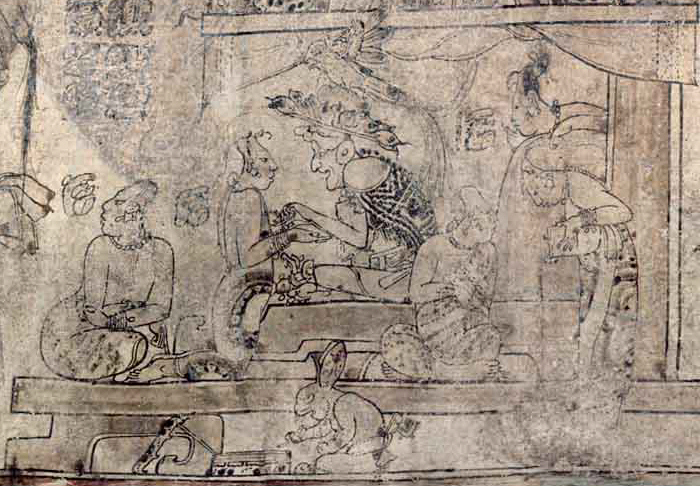
On this Maya chocolate-drinking cup known as the Princeton Vase, God L sits on a throne within a palace

God L is one of the oldest Mayan deities, and associated with trade, riches, and black sorcery, and belongs to the jaguar deities: he has jaguar ears, a jaguar mantle and lives in a jaguar palace. Some take him to be the main ruler over the Underworld. In that sense, he would have to be considered the true "Jaguar God of the Underworld".

== The Jaguar Goddess of Midwifery and War ==
The aged goddess of midwifery, curing, and war Ix Chel, belongs to the jaguar deities. She has jaguar ears and claws and can show the looped cruller element and the large eye of the Jaguar God of Terrestrial Fire (Birth Vase), suggesting that she might be a spouse to this deity.

== The Jaguar Patron of the War Month of Pax ==
The patron deity of the month of Pax has jaguar paws above his ears, a removed lower jaw, and vomits blood. In 16th-century Yucatán, rituals held in the month of Pax centered on the war leader and the puma deity, Cit Chac Coh. Personified as a tree, the Pax deity witnesses the shooting of the Principal Bird Deity and equally of a Vulture King by Hun-Ahpu. The tree personification serves as a metonym for uninhabited wooded areas and their menace (Taube). Particularly scenes on pottery show the Pax deity to be intimately associated with war and human sacrifice.

== The Aged Jaguar Paddler ==
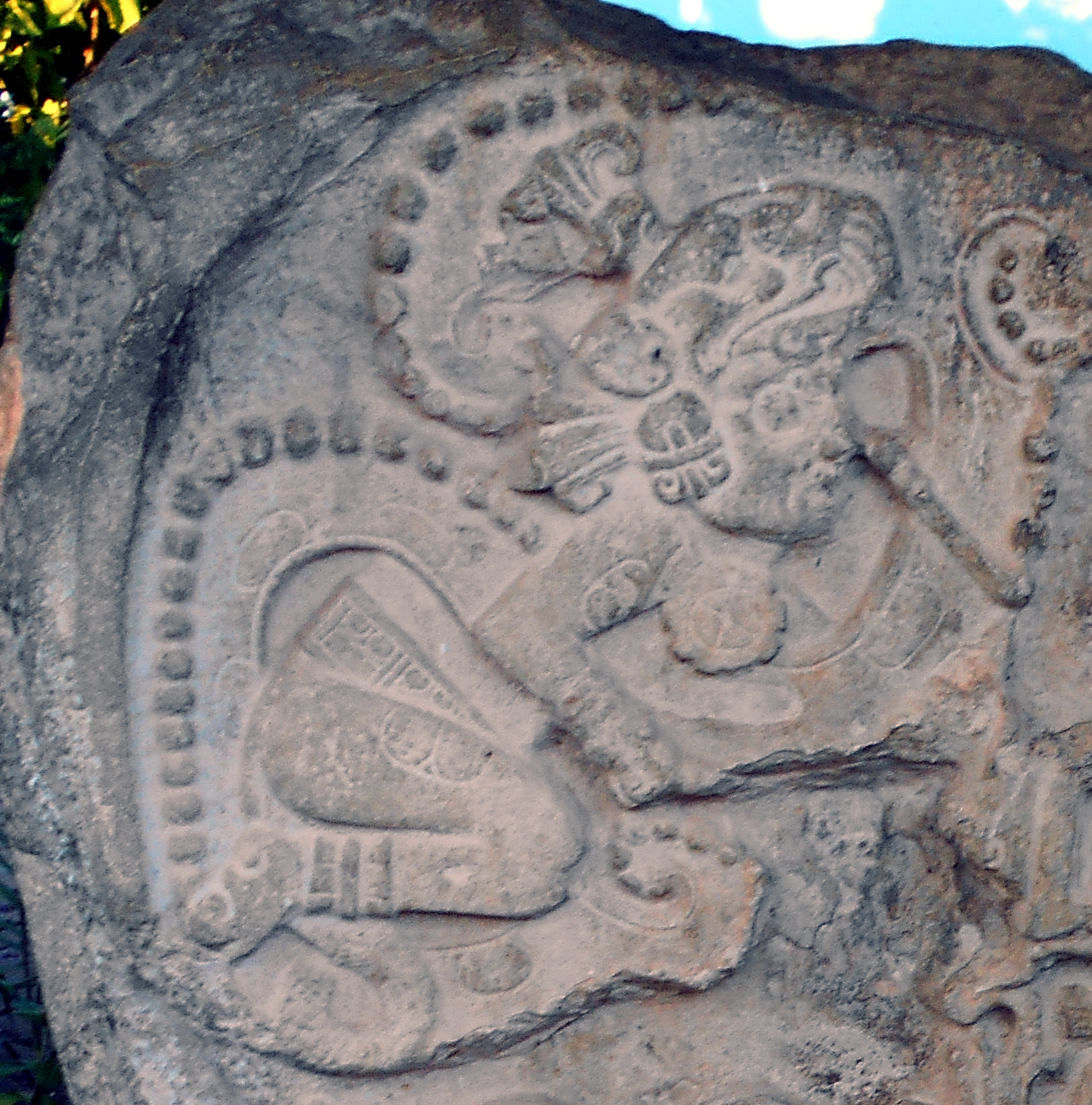
Jaguar Paddler God as depicted on Stela 2 from Ixlu

One of two aged deities associated with the base date of the Long Count and steering the canoe with the Tonsured Maize God has a jaguar headdress and is connected to Night, like the Jaguar God of Terrestrial Fire. (The other Paddler God is an aged form of the sun deity apparently connected to Daylight.)

== The Jaguar Twin Hero ==
The Jaguar Twin Hero, companion to Hun-Ahpu (or Hun-Ajaw) and thus corresponding to Xbalanque in the much later Popol Vuh Twin myth, has patches of jaguar skin stuck to his arms and body, in addition to jaguar pimples around his mouth. Fittingly, in the Popol Vuh, Xbalanque is the more violent Twin.

== Jaguar Protectors and Jaguar Transformers ==
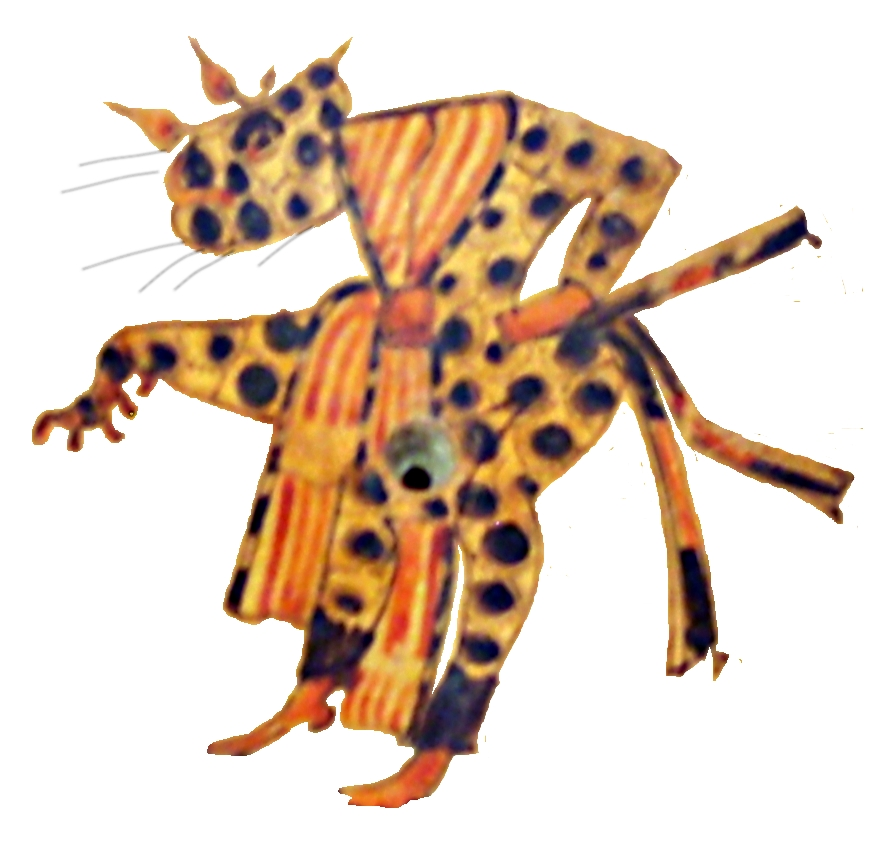
Water Lily Jaguar transformer (way) from a plate in the Museo de América, Madrid

Less clearly classifiable as deities are jaguar protectors (perhaps ancestors) and jaguar transformers. The Water Lily Jaguar (so called because of the water lily on its head) is both a giant jaguar protector, looming large above the king (e.g., Tikal wooden lintel 3, temple I), and a transformer often shown amidst flames.

== Jaguar Baby ==
A specific and as yet unexplained transformation into a jaguar involves a male child with jaguar ears and a jaguar tail (the so-called Jaguar Baby) shown in a transformational somersault. This Jaguar Baby can assume the features of the Jaguar God of Terrestrial Fire.

== See also ==
- Jaguars in Mesoamerican culture
- Tezcatlipoca
