= Maya priesthood =

Religious practice

Until the discovery that Maya stelae depicted kings instead of high priests, the Maya priesthood and their preoccupations had been a main scholarly concern. In the course of the 1960s and over the following decades, however, dynastic research came to dominate interest in the subject. A concept of royal ʼshamanismʼ, chiefly propounded by Linda Schele and Freidel, came to occupy the forefront instead. Yet, Classic Maya civilization, being highly ritualistic, would have been unthinkable without a developed priesthood. Like other Pre-Hispanic Mesoamerican priesthoods, the early Maya priesthood consisted of a hierarchy of professional priests serving as intermediaries between the population and the deities. Their basic skill was the art of reading and writing. The priesthood as a whole was the keeper of knowledge concerning the deities and their cult, including calendrics, astrology, divination, and prophecy. In addition, they were experts in historiography and genealogy. Priests were usually male and could marry. Most of our knowledge concerns Yucatán in the Late Postclassic, with additional data stemming from the contemporaneous Guatemalan Highlands.

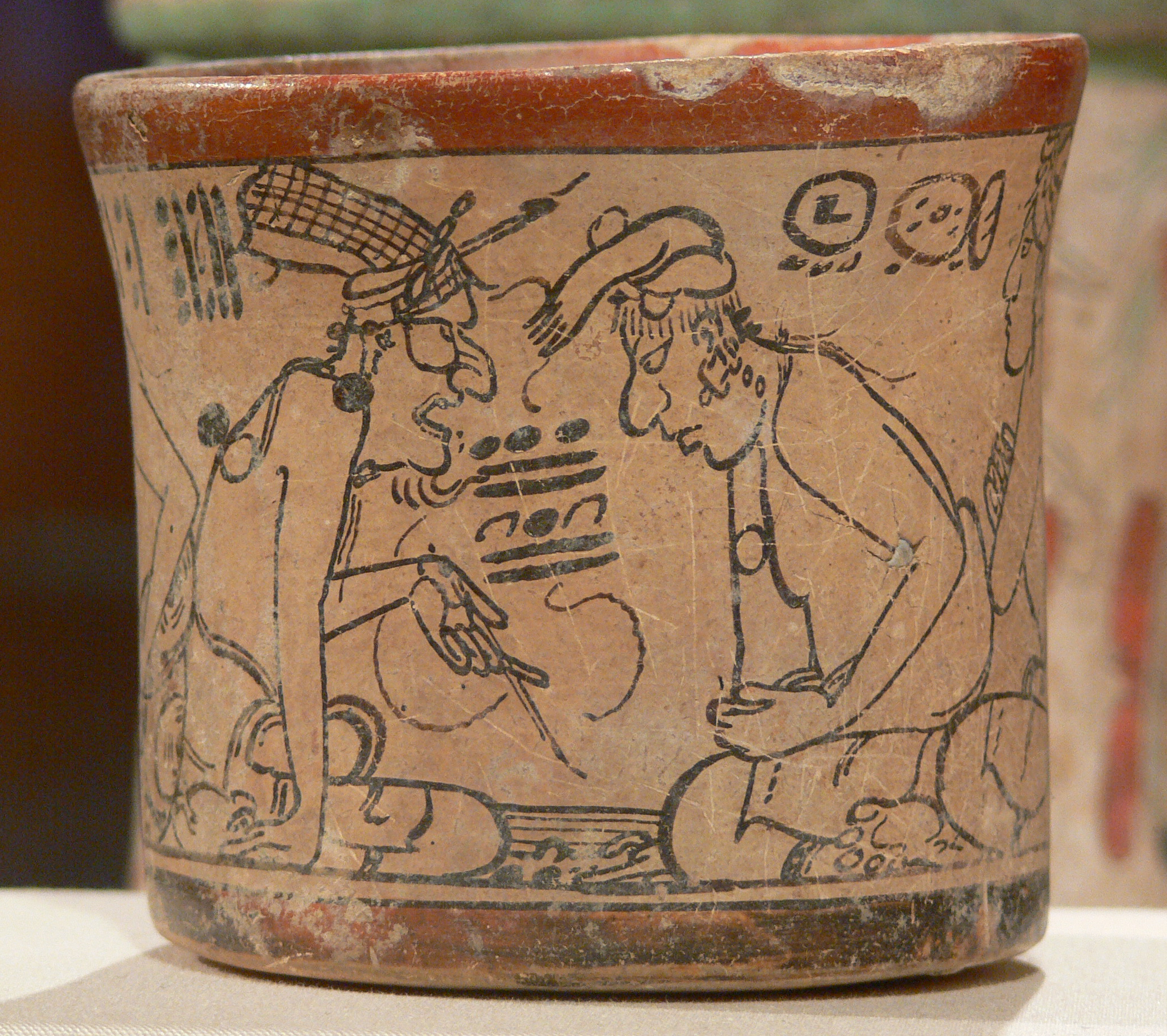
High priest (aj kʼin), evincing the eye of Kinich Ahau Itzamna and the netted headdress of the Bacabs, while instructing scribes

== Priests: In between shamans and kings ==
=== Shamans and priests ===
The Maya class of the priests is sometimes thought to have emerged from a pre-existing network of shamans as social complexity grew. The classic Siberian shaman is characterised by his intimate relationship with one or several helper spirits, 'ecstatic' voyages into non-human realms, and often operates individually, on behalf of his clients. In 20th-century Maya communities, diviners, and also curers, may show some features of true shamans, particularly vocation through illness or dreams, trance, and communication with a spirit. In reference to these features, they are often loosely called 'shamans' by ethnographers. On the other hand, priests are chiefly cultic functionaries operating within a well-defined hierarchy and offering food, sacrifices and prayers to the deities on behalf of social groups situated on different levels. In 20th-century Maya communities of the north-western Guatemalan highlands, the hierarchies of 'Prayermakers' offer examples of such priests. The Pre-Hispanic religious functionaries described by men like Diego de Landa, Tomás de Torquemada and Bartolomé de las Casas were also priests, not shamans.

=== Priestly kings and priests ===
Among the Mayas, priestly functions were often fulfilled by dignitaries who were not professional priests, but this fact cannot be used to argue the nonexistence of a separate priesthood. The Popol Vuh stereotypically describes the first ancestors as "bloodletters and sacrificers" and as the carriers of their deities, a priestly function. To the Kʼicheʼ kings and highest dignitaries coming after them, the kingship was a sacred institution and the temple service a duty: during certain intervals, they abstained from intercourse, fasted, prayed, and burnt offerings, "pleading for the light and the life of their vassals and servants." Although the text describes the three temples dedicated to the first ancestors' patron deities and names what appear to be the two high priests of the main deities (the Lords Ah Tohil and Ah Cucumatz), it does not discuss, or even mention, local priests.

According to some Yucatec sources, too, the rulers and the high nobility carried out priestly tasks. The highest Mayapan nobility, for example, is stated to have served continually in the temples; for the early Choles, no regular priesthood is mentioned, so that one might assume that the chiefs performed the priestly functions themselves. The Yucatec king (or "head chief of a province"), known as the halach uinic ('true man'), is defined both as a 'governor' and a 'bishop'. Without a grounding in esoteric and ritual knowledge, a ruler could apparently not function.

For the Classic period, the king should probably be considered a sacred, priestly king, perhaps subsuming in his person the priesthood as a whole. The latter idea has been used as an explanation for the seeming lack of references to priests in Classic period texts. The idea of the king representing the priesthood should not be pushed to its limits, however, since due to our lack of knowledge of priestly titles and imperfect understanding of the script, textual references to priests may easily pass unnoticed. The existence of a separate Classic priesthood, at the kingdom's court as well as in its towns and villages, is hardly doubtful; its absence would constitute an anomaly among early civilizations.

== The priesthood in the Late-Postclassic Period ==
The main description of a priestly hierarchy as it functioned in the first decades of the 16th century stems from Landa's account of Yucatec society, but isolated terms for priestly offices have also been transmitted from other Maya groups.

=== The Yucatec hierarchy ===
==== Recruitment ====
In Yucatán, priests were sons of priests or second sons of nobles. The priesthood provided high status positions for those children of the Maya nobility who could not obtain political office. They were trained through an apprentice system, with young adults being selected according to their descent and individual abilities.

==== Offices ====
The high priest of the kingdom ('province') was called ahau can mai or ah kin mai, with mai being either a family name or a functional designation. The position was hereditary, usually passed on to sons or close relatives. The high priest lived from the contributions of his town priests and the gifts of the lords. The responsibilities of the ahau can mai included the writing of books; the teaching of the Maya script and the Maya calendar to the novices; examining and appointing new priests and providing them with books; performing the more important rituals; and advising the other lords.

The town priest was called ah kʼin, a word with a basic meaning of 'diviner' (kʼin by itself meaning 'sun' or 'day'). The ah kʼinob had the responsibility of conducting public and private rituals within individual towns throughout the province. They "preached and published the festival days," determined the appropriate steps in case of need, made sacrifices, and administered the "sacraments", acts connected to life cycle rituals. The town priests were assisted by four old men called chac.

The priests carrying out human sacrifice were called ah nakom; their status was relatively low. Priests giving oracles were known as chilan or chilam, 'oracular priest' (often translated as 'prophet'; an influential role, with the Chilam Balam as a prime example). The chilan may have used mind-altering substances.

=== The Itzá priesthood ===
The last independent Maya state, the 17th-century Itzá kingdom of Nojpetén, was ruled by the king, Kan Ekʼ and the high priest, Ajkʼín Kan Ekʼ. Their priesthood seems to have consisted of 12 priests: In the hall of the dwelling of the petty king, Ajau Kan Ekʼ, was a stone table with twelve seats for the priests. This priestly college is reminiscent of the twelve head priests of the kingdom of Mayapan. The Itzá high priest should perhaps be counted its 13th member. Thirteen priests are also mentioned as part of a classificatory system shared by the Yucatec and the Itzá states, and further comprising 13 katuns, 13 provinces and 13 ambassadors.

==== Iconography ====
In Chichen Itza (Temple of the Chac Mool under the Temple of the Warriors), long-robed, aged and ascetic-looking characters with broad-rimmed feather hats have been depicted that are carrying offerings. They are seated in a row with rain deity impersonators (perhaps rainmakers) directly behind them, and have been interpreted as Itzá priests.

=== Priestly offices outside Yucatán ===
In dictionaries concerning the 16th-century Pokom Mayas of the Verapaz, one finds terms like ah mai and ah zi 'those who make offerings'; ah zacumvach, 'white countenance' and ah quih for diviner; and ihcamcavil, 'carrier of the idol', a function like that fulfilled by the first ancestors of the Kʼicheʼ and probably referring to priests serving in processions. Black sorcerers (ah itz, ah var, ah kakzik) were consulted by lords and princes for witchcraft against enemies and for defensive magic.

== The priesthood in the Classic Period ==
At least seven centuries separate the early Spanish missionary descriptions of the Maya priesthood from Classic Maya society. Although archaic religions tend to be very conservative, it can not be assumed beforehand that these descriptions are valid for the Classic priesthood as well. It has been suggested that the priestly function of the king completely overshadowed that of the priests (see above). Nonetheless, Classic iconography appears to show various sorts of priests, and some hieroglyphic titles have been suggested to be priestly ones. Amongst these are ajkʼuhuun ('worshipper'), yajaw kʼahk ('master of fire'), ti'sakhuun ('prophet'), and yajaw te' ('master of the tree/woods'). Priestly duties included sacrifice and the propitiation of deities, inauguration of kings, writing and interpretation of codices, and of course maintenance of ritual spaces and paraphernalia. Without being permanent ministers, the kings of the Classic Period (kʼuhul ajaw or "holy lord") regularly officiated ex officio as high priests.

=== Appearance ===
Classic art, particularly scenes on vases, depicts characters writing and reading books, aspersing and inaugurating kings, overseeing or performing human sacrifice, and presiding over burial rites, all activities suggestive of priests. These characters, sometimes aged and ascetic, can show some of the attributes of Late-Postclassic priesthood mentioned in Yucatec sources. Among these Postclassic attributes are long, heavy vestments and 'chasubles'; feather jackets; 'miters'; aspergillums; and tail-like ribbons hanging down from the jacket.

=== Patron deities of the priesthood ===
Chief among the patron deities of the Classic priests was the upper god, Itzamna, first priest and first writer, still shown officiating in one of the pictures of the Late-Postclassic Madrid Codex. Patron deities of writing and calendrical reckoning were of obvious importance to the priesthood, especially the writers among them, and included a Maya maize god and the Howler Monkey Gods. The Howler Monkey God also personified the day sign, suggesting that he may more specifically have been a patron of diviners.

== The Mesoamerican Maya priesthood after the Conquest ==
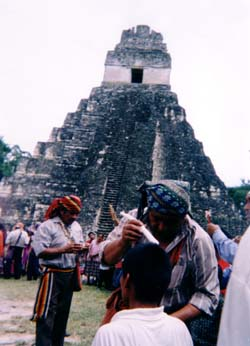
Contemporary Maya priest in a healing ritual at Tikal

The priestly hierarchy disappeared in the wake of the Spanish Conquest. Following the disastrous epidemics of the first colonial decades, the Mesoamerican priestly functions were restructured to fit within the incipient new order. In Yucatán, the village herbalists and curers seem to have become responsible for the rituals of the forest and the fields as well, and thus to have become a sort of village priests. Their name, ahmen, already occurs in the earliest colonial dictionaries, yet only with the restricted meaning of 'craftsman'. Originally only a maker of all sorts of poultices, the curer-ahmen gradually appears to have become a maker of prayers and sacrifices as well. Naturally, then, priestly ahmenob are not yet mentioned in Landa's account. The literate aspects of the Prehispanic priesthood were partly assumed by local school masters and church singers (maestros cantores), who may also have been among the writers and compilers of the Chilam Balam books.

In the Guatemalan Highlands, the colonial and modern development was different and eventually resulted in thoroughly organized, indigenous priestly hierarchies, such as that of Momostenango. In this town, a hierarchy of 'mother-fathers' is charged with the priestly tasks of prayer and sacrifice: two of them on behalf of the town as a whole, fourteen for the wards, and three hundred for the patrilineages. Besides this hierarchy, a large part of the population (about 10000) has been initiated as diviner (ajkʼij).
