= Kinich Ahau =

16th-century Yucatec name of the Maya sun god

K'inich Ahau
- God of the sun
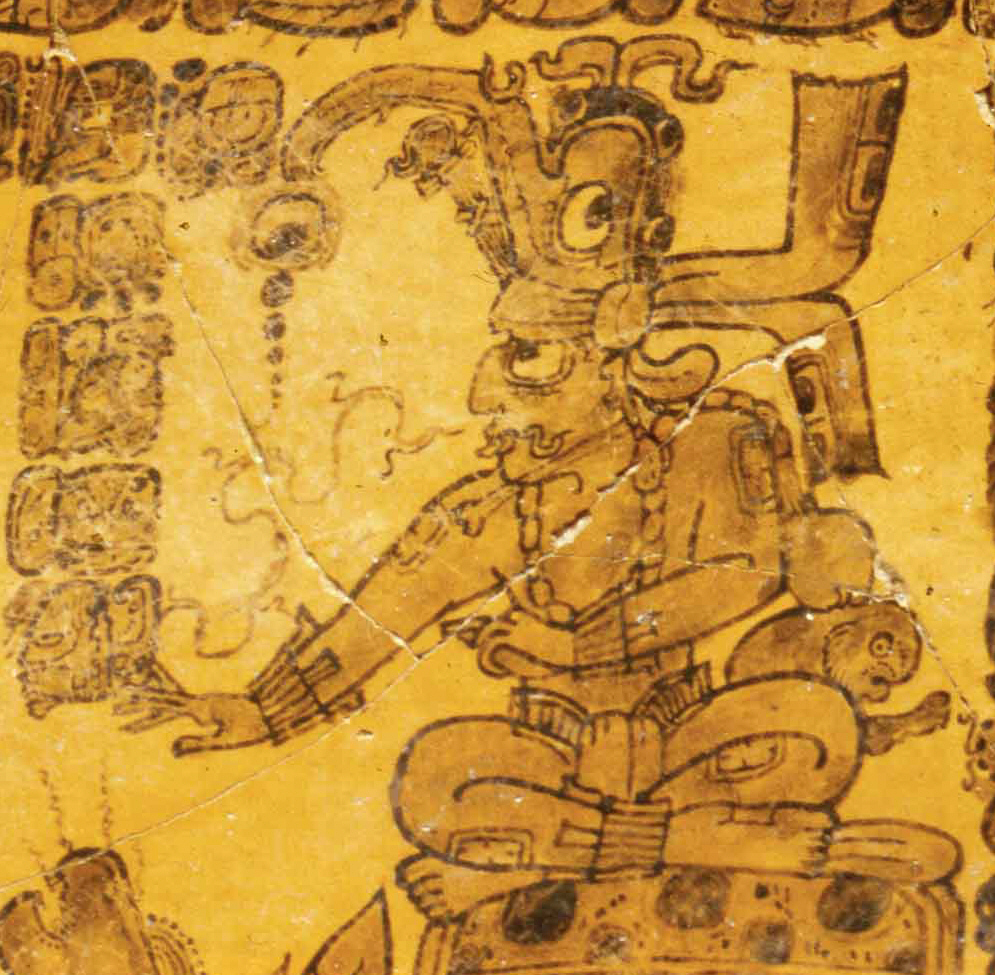
- K'inich Ahau as a ruler, found on a Classic Period ceramic. K'in glyphic infixes can be seen on his shins and upper arms.
- Other names: God G
- Abode: Sun(?)
- Planet: Sun
- Age: Middle-aged deity
- Gender: Male

Equivalents
- Aztec: Tōnatiuh
- Greek: Helios
- Hindu: Surya
- Roman: Sol

K'inich Ahau (Mayan: [kʼiː.nitʃ a'haw]) is the 16th-century Yucatec name of the Maya sun god, also referred to as God G when referring to the codices. In the Classic period, God G is depicted as a middle-aged man with an aquiline nose, large square eyes, cross-eyed, and a filed incisor in the upper row of teeth. Among the southern Lacandons, K'inich Ahau continued to play a role in narrative well into the second half of the twentieth century.

== Name ==
K'inich Ahau is the Yucatec and Lacandon name of the sun god. His name contains element kʼinich, usually assumed to mean 'sun-eyed' or 'sun-facing'. This title seems to have been in general use as a royal title during the Classic Period. Furthermore, k'inich itself contains the word k'in, meaning sun or day. The glyph for k'in can often be found infixed on the deity's body. The ahau or ajaw portion of the deity's name is generally accepted mean to lord, making one possible translation of the god's name, Sun-Facing Lord.

== 16th-century Yucatán ==
K'inich Ahau was the patron of one of the four years of the 52-year cycle (Landa). In the rituals introducing this year, war dances were executed. He may conceivably be related to the patron deity of Izamal, K'inich Kakmo 'Sun-Facing Fire Parrot', who was reported to descend to earth while the sun was standing in the zenith in order to consume offerings.

=== Diego de Landa's Relación de las cosas de Yucatán ===
In his account, Bishop Diego de Landa attests to K'inich Ahau a number of times. He refers to a statue or image of the god receiving offerings "egg yolks, others with deerhearts, and another made with their mild pepper." He additionally claims that many performed autosacrifice from their ears and smeared it on the statues of the gods, a ritual practice that Bishop de Landa would attest to again in his account. K'inich Ahau was perhaps considered an aspect of the upper god, Itzamna. Although this possibly a result of a misunderstanding by de Landa, who later in the account refers to a deity by the name of Cinchahau Yzamna, clearly the combination of the names for K'inich Ahau and Itzamna.

== Classic period ==
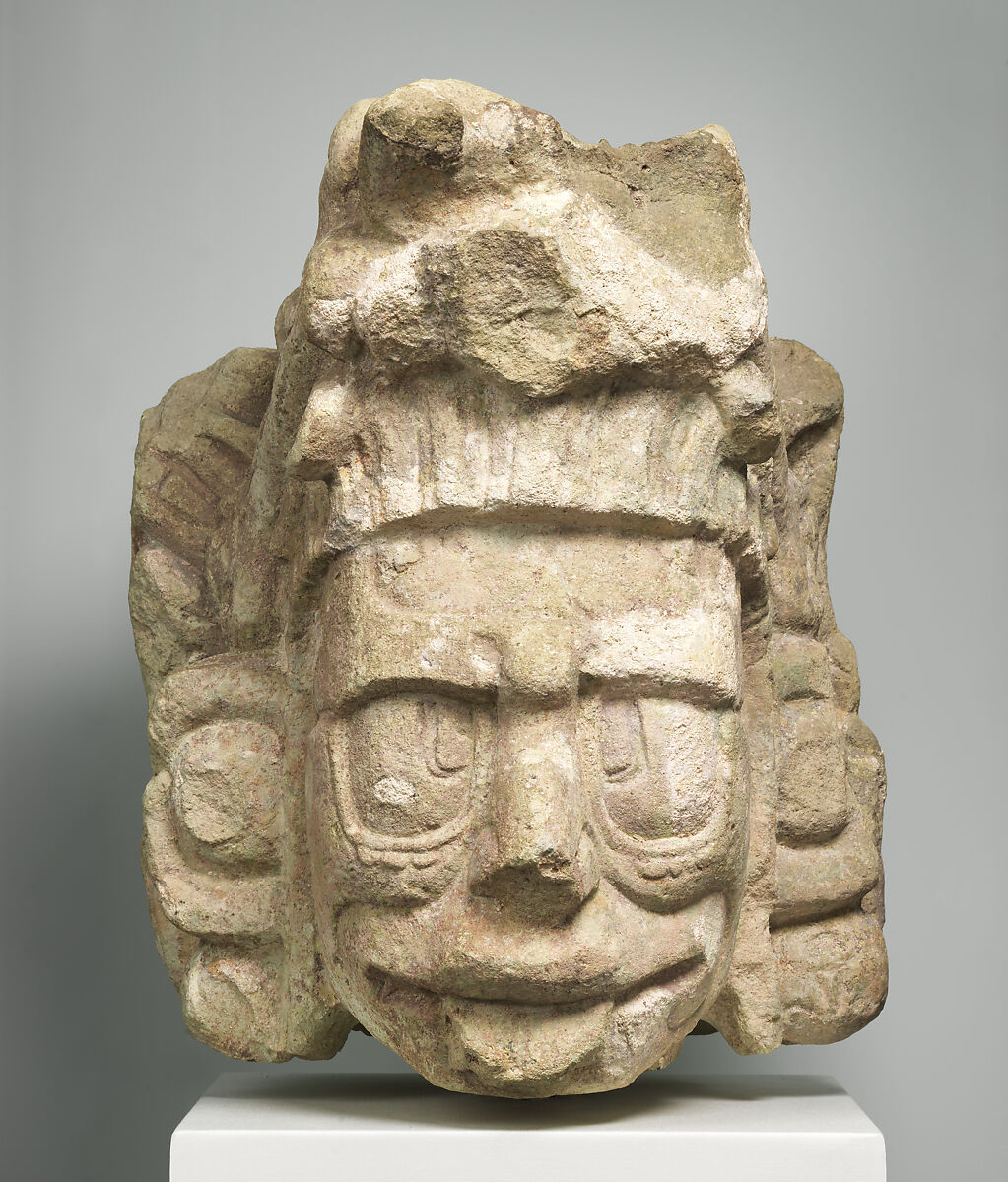
Head of K'inich Ahau rendered in stucco. Artwork located at the Metropolitan Museum of Art. The k'in glyph is infixed in the god's forehead.

K'inich Ahau's appearances in Classic Maya art are, perhaps, best known from large stucco masks adorning pyramids. Compared to the deities connected to agricultural fertility, however, he occurs rather infrequently in other media than stucco, and is rarely part of narrative events. It may be noted that the Hero Twins of the 16th century Popol Vuh, Hunahpu and Xbalanque, although stated to have changed into Sun and Moon, are never shown assimilated to God G or the Moon Goddess.

=== Land of the Sunrise: Eastern Paradise ===
The Sun God is associated with an aquatic eastern paradise, where he can assume the shape of a chimerical water bird, or be shown as a young man, paddling a canoe. Such imagery could suggest lyric religious poetry comparable to the Aztec evocations of a 'flower paradise' (Taube).

=== Ancestral Solar Kings ===
The sun deity can be shown as a king (ajaw) seated high on a throne cushion (as on the famous, narrative 'Rabbit Vase' from Naranjo), or as a ruler carrying the bicephalic 'ceremonial bar'. Inversely, the Maya king is repeatedly assimilated to the sun deity. The emblematic double-bird of the early Copan king, Yax Kʼukʼ Moʼ 'Great Quetzal-Parrot', shows the head of the sun deity within its beaks. Ancestral Maya royalty could occasionally be see assimilated to the sun god and moon goddess. The solar aspect of a king often suggests a possible apotheosis and life after death. See Lintel with Royal Woman in Lunar Cartouche in the collection of the Los Angeles County Museum of Art for an example of this.

=== Calendar ===
Hieroglyphically, the sun god is the patron of the day-unit (kʼin 'day, sun'), the month of Yaxkʼin 'dry season', and the number Four (in parallel with the day Ahau).

=== Connections with other deities ===
Several other deities evince a large eye, such Itzamna, Chaak (the Rain God), and various jaguar gods. Attribute sharing (including the kʼin infix) occurs chiefly with the so-called Jaguar God of the Underworld and a human-faced ocean deity with shell ears, fins beside the mouth, and a sacrificial awl set in the mouth. The 'Jaguar God of the Underworld' is traditionally referred to by scholars as the 'Night Sun', i.e., the form supposedly taken by the sun during his subterranean journey from West to East. It has been suggested that the three just-mentioned deities involved in the sharing of attributes could, perhaps, represent various stages of the sun's daily cycle.

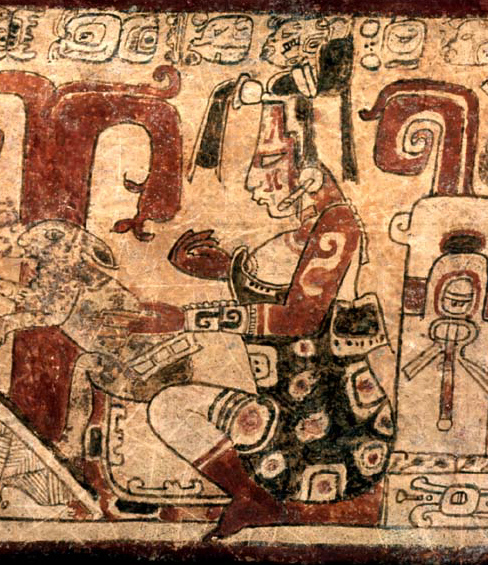
Maya Moon Goddess holding the lunar rabbit.

Additionally, in the ceramic pictured above the lunar rabbit hides behind K'inich Ahau in a scene that depicts a wider attested myth involving the theft of the regalia of God L, an underworld deity. This depiction is an outlier, as it more routinely involves the rabbit's regular companion, the Moon Goddess. This could suggest a relationship between the two deities.

== Mythology and ritual ==
Recent Maya mythology is mainly concerned with Sun's childhood and the conflicts leading up to his actual solar transformation. Although specific imagery is used for the path of the sun (for example, the sun being carried through the underworld on the shoulders of its lord), there are hardly any histories concerning the mature sun deity, save for the southern Lacandons. According to them, K'inich Ahau, the elder brother of the upper god, will put an end to this world by descending from the sky and have his jaguars devour mankind. Little is also known about specific solar rituals, although K'inich Ahau regularly occurs in the Dresden Codex, which is largely concerned with ritual matters.

== See also ==
- List of solar deities

== Bibliography ==
- Boremanse, Contes et mythologie des indiens lacandons. 1986.
- Hellmuth, Monster und Menschen in der Maya-Kunst. 1987.
- Landa, see Tozzer
- Milbrath, Star Gods of the Maya.
- Stuart and Stuart, Palenque, Eternal City of the Maya. Thames and Hudson 2008.
- Taube, Flower Mountain. Res 45 (2004): 69–98.
- Taube and Miller, The Gods and Symbols of Ancient Mexico and the Maya.
- Thompson, Maya History and Religion. 1970.
- Tozzer, A Comparative Study of the Mayas and the Lacandones. New York 1907.
- Tozzer, Landa's Relación de las Cosas de Yucatán. 1941.
