= Princeton Maya Vase with God L =

Maya vase

The Princeton Vase is a noted example of Late Classic Maya ceramics in codex style. It was looted and is now held by Princeton University Art Museum. Originally serving as a drinking vessel for chocolate, it depicts a throne room occupied by an aged deity, wearing an owl headdress, and by five young women surrounding him. In front of the throne, a bound captive is being decapitated by two masked men. This scene was long believed to refer to an episode in the Popol Vuh. The vase is said to be comparable to the Jaguar Baby vase in New York City's Metropolitan Museum of Art.

== Description ==
The vase, with an overall cream and incidental orange and brown-black slip, as well as traces of post-fire Maya blue pigment, dates to the Late Classic period of Maya civilization (late 7th or early 8th century). The exact origin of the vase is unknown, as it appeared outside of an archaeological context and was sold to the museum in the 1970s. According to the study conducted by the museum, the vase originated in the Nakbé region, Mirador Basin, Petén, Guatemala or in the Calakmul region, Campeche, Mexico, places where similar ceramics were produced. A photograph of it was first published in M.D. Coe's The Maya Scribe and His World (1973).

Toward the rim of the vase, above the painted scene, formulaic texts consecrate the vessel, specifying its purpose as a drinking vessel for chocolate, and designating its owner, a lord named Muwaan K'uk'. The vase would have been used in courtly feasts similar to the one depicted. The main surface of the vessel shows a calligraphic painting, executed with graceful, sure lines, of a theatrically composed mythological scene. Subtle visual devices, including one woman tapping the foot of another while her face points to the left, direct the viewer to turn the drinking vessel, allowing for a temporal unfolding as part of the viewing experience.

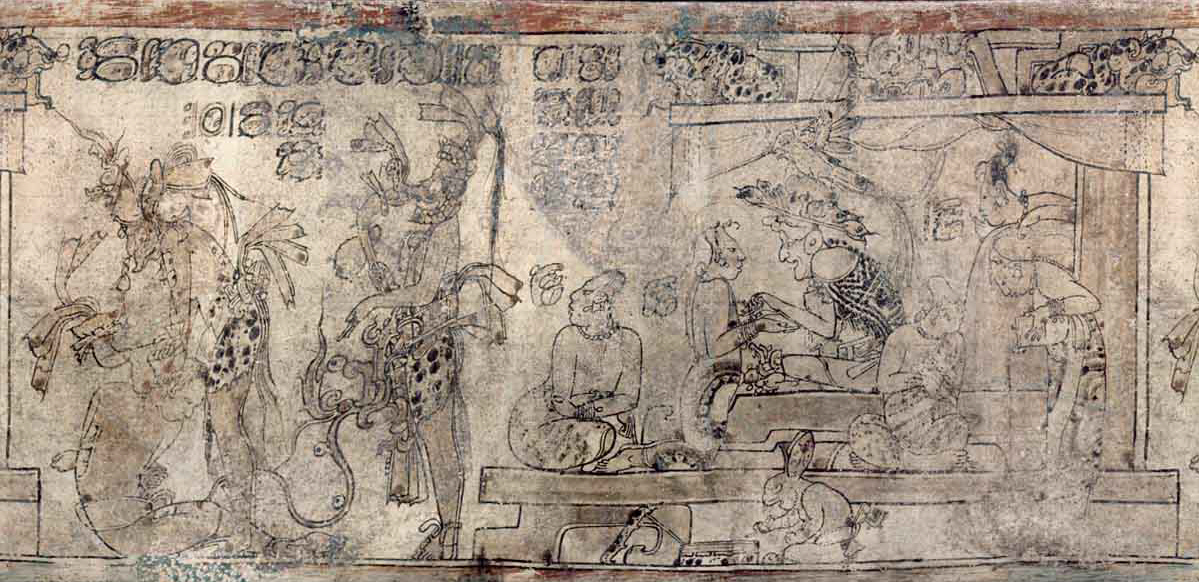

== Iconography ==
The scene's chief figure is known from the Dresden Codex as god L, a deity of trade, shamanism, and warfare. The old, toothless man sits on a throne within a conventional depiction of a palace, with a pier behind him and what is likely a cornice above. The cornice is decorated with two jawless jaguars flanking the forward-facing face of a shark. Curtains have been furled to reveal the seated lord. God L can be identified by his characteristic open-weave brocaded shawl, as well as the broad-brimmed hat decorated with owl feathers, and a stuffed owl with outstretched wings.

Five elegant female figures, perhaps concubines, and reminiscent of the goddess I from the Dresden Codex, surround the old god, who delicately ties a bracelet on one of them. The women wear loose, flowing sarongs, or tight-fitting wrap-around cloths, decorated with batik-like dyed patterns rendered in a soft brown wash. Each has jewelry at the neck, ears, and wrists. One of the women behind god L is pouring chocolate from a vessel similar in shape to the Princeton Vase itself, frothing the bitter delicacy into a vessel whose figure has been lost to wear.

Below and sitting next to the throne, a rabbit (an animal more often associated with God L) is writing in a book with jaguar-pelt covers, perhaps to record the scene in front of the throne: Two men wearing elaborate masks and wielding axes decapitate a bound, stripped figure whose winding serpent attribute, beset with death-eyes, is typical of writers, or in any case, of functionaries for whom the art of writing was essential. One of the two men shows the features of the wind god; the other one wears an executioner's mask with a jaguar paw nose.

== Explanations ==
Scholars have tended to interpret the vase images by mythology, believing they represent elements of the Popol Vuh, the 16th-century K'iche' Maya mythological narrative.

Viewed within this framework, the scene has been said to show the ritual execution of Vucub-Hunahpu, uncle to the Hero Twins, by order of god L, taken as the lord of the underworld (Xibalba).

However, in 2004 Miller and Martin pointed out that the executioners, clad in identical jaguar skirts, are two in number, and that the wind god character is wearing a headband; therefore, they claimed that the two executioners represent the Hero Twins themselves (that is, the 'Headband Twins', their Classic precursors), decapitating a lord of the underworld rather than Vucub-Hunahpu. The scene would thus offer a parallel to an episode in which these two heroes trick the underworld lords into asking for their own beheading.

These conflicting interpretations are basically speculative. Moreover, the execution scene may also involve historical persons.
