= Huehueteotl =

Mesoamerican deity figuring in the pantheons of pre-Columbian cultures

- Fire god
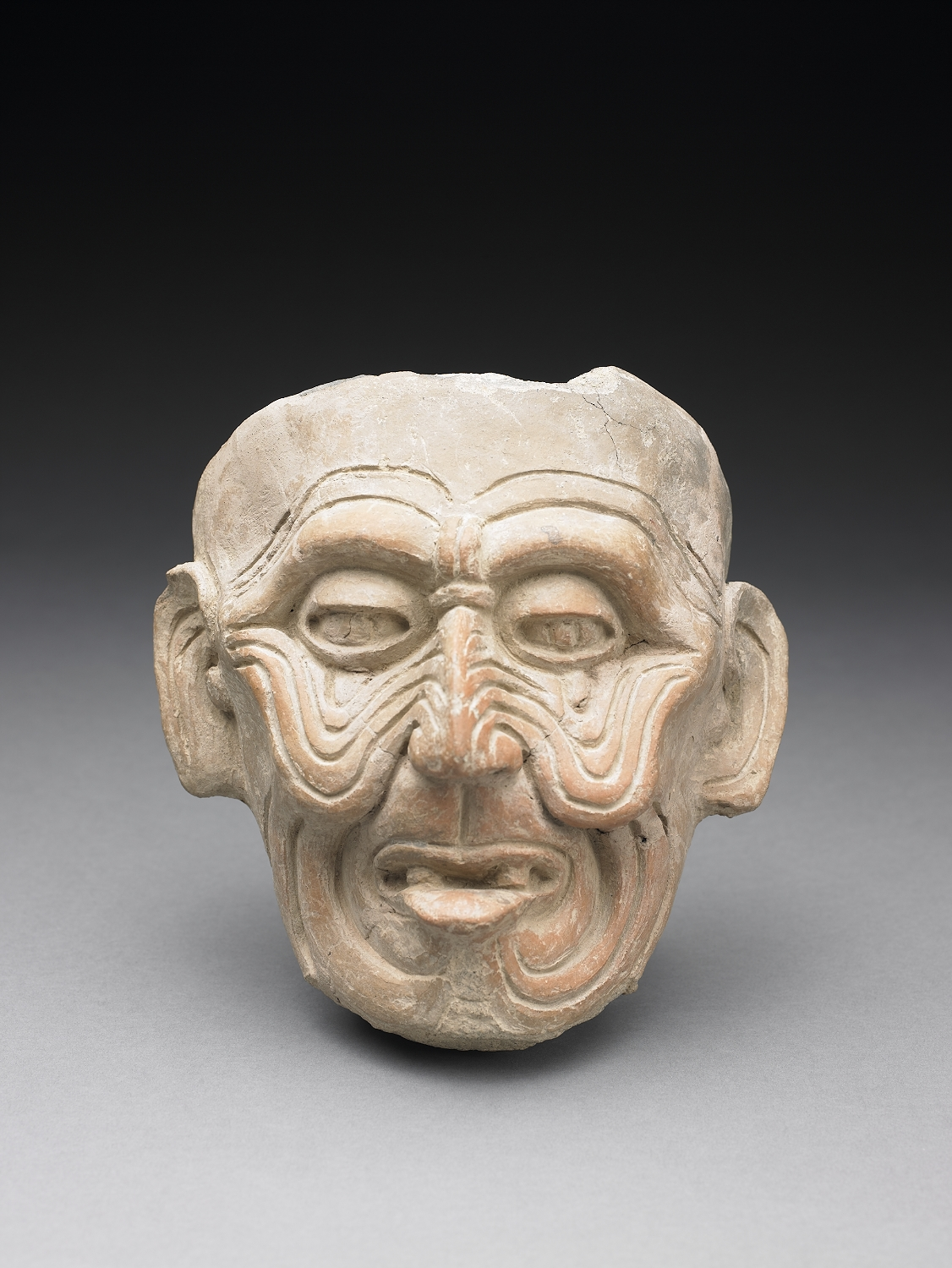
- Head of Old God, Huehueteotl, held at the Birmingham Museum of Art
- Other names: Huehuetéotl, Ueueteotl, Nahui-Acatl
- Associate: Xiuhtecuhtli
- Gender: Male
- Ethnic group: Mesoamerican

Huehueteotl (/ˌweɪweɪˈteɪoʊtəl/ WAY-way-TAY-oh-təl; Nahuatl pronunciation: [weːweˈteoːt͡ɬ]) is an aged Mesoamerican deity figuring in the pantheons of pre-Columbian cultures, particularly in Aztec mythology and others of the Central Mexico region. The spellings Huehuetéotl and Ueueteotl are also used. The name Huehueteotl stems from Nahuatl huēhueh [ˈweːweʔ] ("old") and teōtl [ˈteoːt͡ɬ] ("god"). It seems to connect the Old God to certain Mayan deities called Mam ("Grandfather"). Huehueteotl's calendrical name is Nahui-Acatl ("Four-Reed").

Although known mostly in the cultures of that region, images and iconography depicting Huehueteotl have been found at other archaeological sites across Mesoamerica, such as in the Gulf region, western Mexico, Protoclassic-era sites in the Guatemalan highlands such as Kaminaljuyú and Late-Postclassic sites on the northern Yucatán Peninsula (Miller and Taube, 1993:189).

Huehueteotl is frequently considered to overlap with, or be another aspect of, a central Mexican/Aztec deity associated with fire, Xiuhtecuhtli. In particular the Florentine Codex identifies Huehueteotl as an alternative epithet for Xiutecuhtli, and consequently that deity is sometimes referred to as Xiutecuhtli-Huehueteotl.

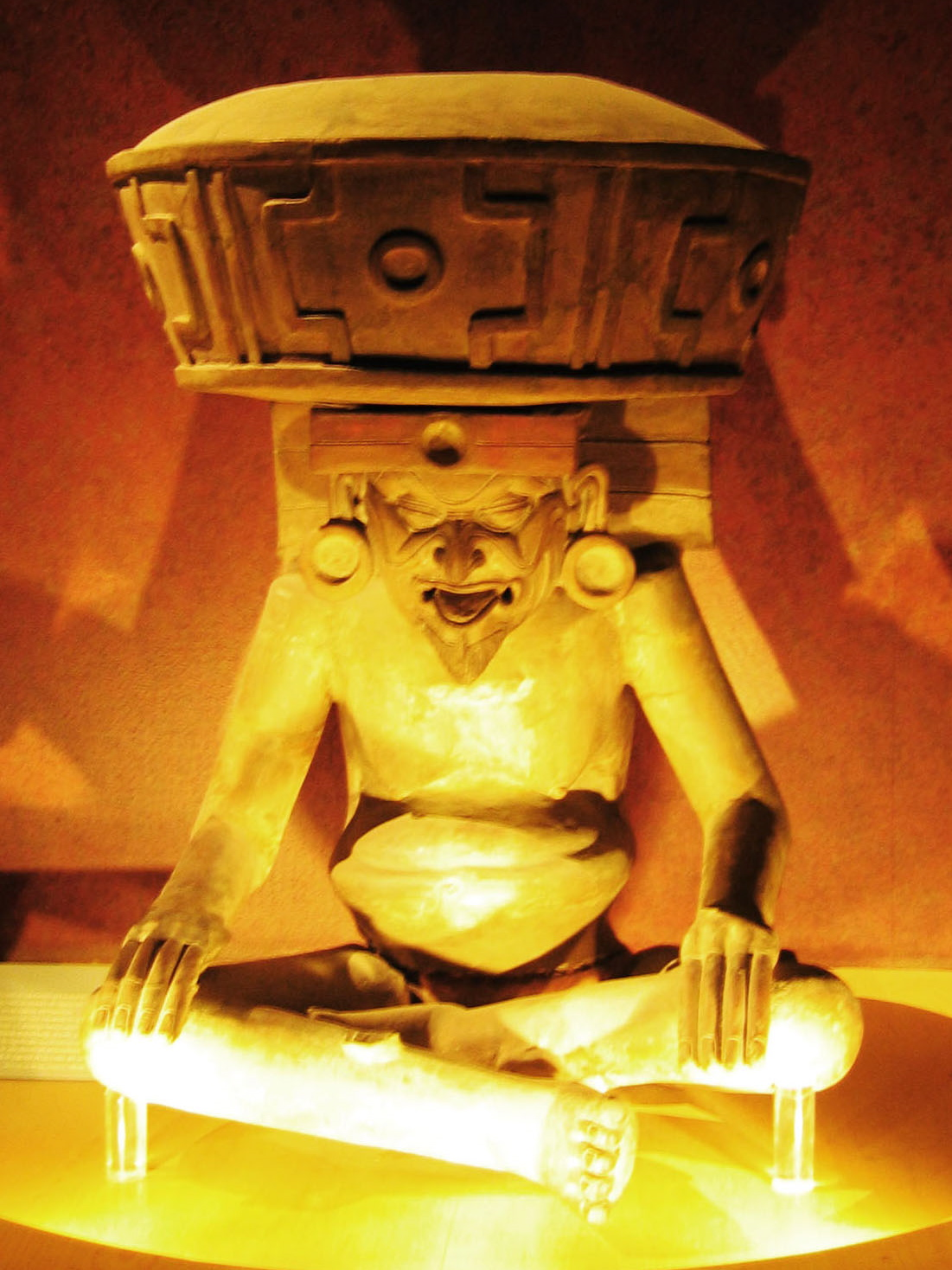
Statue of Huehueteotl (Museo Nacional de Antropología, Mexico City)

However, Huehueteotl is characteristically depicted as an aged or even decrepit being, often with a beard, whereas Xiutecuhtli's appearance is much more youthful and vigorous, in line with his marked association with rulership and (youthful) warriors.

== Worship ==
The Florentine Codex describes an Aztec religious observance during the monthly feast of Izcalli (dedicated to Xiuhtecuhtli and Tlaloc), when boys had to hunt in the swamps for small water-related animals, such as snakes, lizards, frogs and even dragonfly larvae, and present these to elders serving as the guardians of the fire deity. As a reward for the offerings, the priest would give them steamed corn dough (tamales) stuffed with amaranth greens. At this occasion the god was represented as young with turquoise and quetzal feathers for ceremonial purposes. Later during the month he appeared as aging and tired, covered with the colours of gold, black and red. Perhaps this transformation of young into old can explain the fact that in the codices, Xiuhtecuhtli appears as a vigorous young man, whereas his representations in stone show him to be aged and decrepit.

In another, more dramatic, and better known celebration, the Aztecs cut out the hearts of human sacrifices and burned them on coal. As a result of this, the people would regain Huehueteotl's favour through the god's elements — fire and blood.
