= Jaguars in Mesoamerican cultures =

Mythologically significant animal of the Western Hemisphere

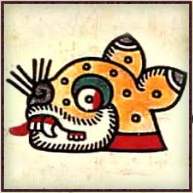
The day sign "Jaguar" from the Codex Laud

The representation of jaguars in Mesoamerican cultures has a long history, with iconographic examples dating back to at least the mid-Formative period of Mesoamerican chronology.

The jaguar (Panthera onca) is an animal with a prominent association and appearance in the cultures and belief systems of pre-Columbian Mesoamerican societies in the New World, similar to the lion (Panthera leo) and tiger (Panthera tigris) in the Old World. Quick, agile, and powerful enough to take down the largest prey in the jungle, the jaguar is the biggest felid in Central or South America, and one of the most efficient and aggressive predators. Endowed with a spotted coat and well-adapted for the jungle, hunting either in the trees or water, making it one of the few felines tolerant of water, the jaguar was, and remains, revered among the Indigenous Americans who live in its range.

All major Mesoamerican civilizations prominently featured a jaguar god, and for many, such as the Olmec, the jaguar was an important part of religious practice. For those who resided in or near the tropical jungle, the jaguar was well known and became incorporated into the lives of the inhabitants. The jaguar's formidable size, reputation as a predator, and its evolved capacities to survive in the jungle made it an animal to be revered. The Olmec and the Maya witnessed this animal's habits, adopting the jaguar as an authoritative and martial symbol, and incorporated the animal into their mythology. The jaguar stands today, as it did in the past, as an important symbol in the lives of those who coexist with this felid.

== Jaguars and the Maya ==
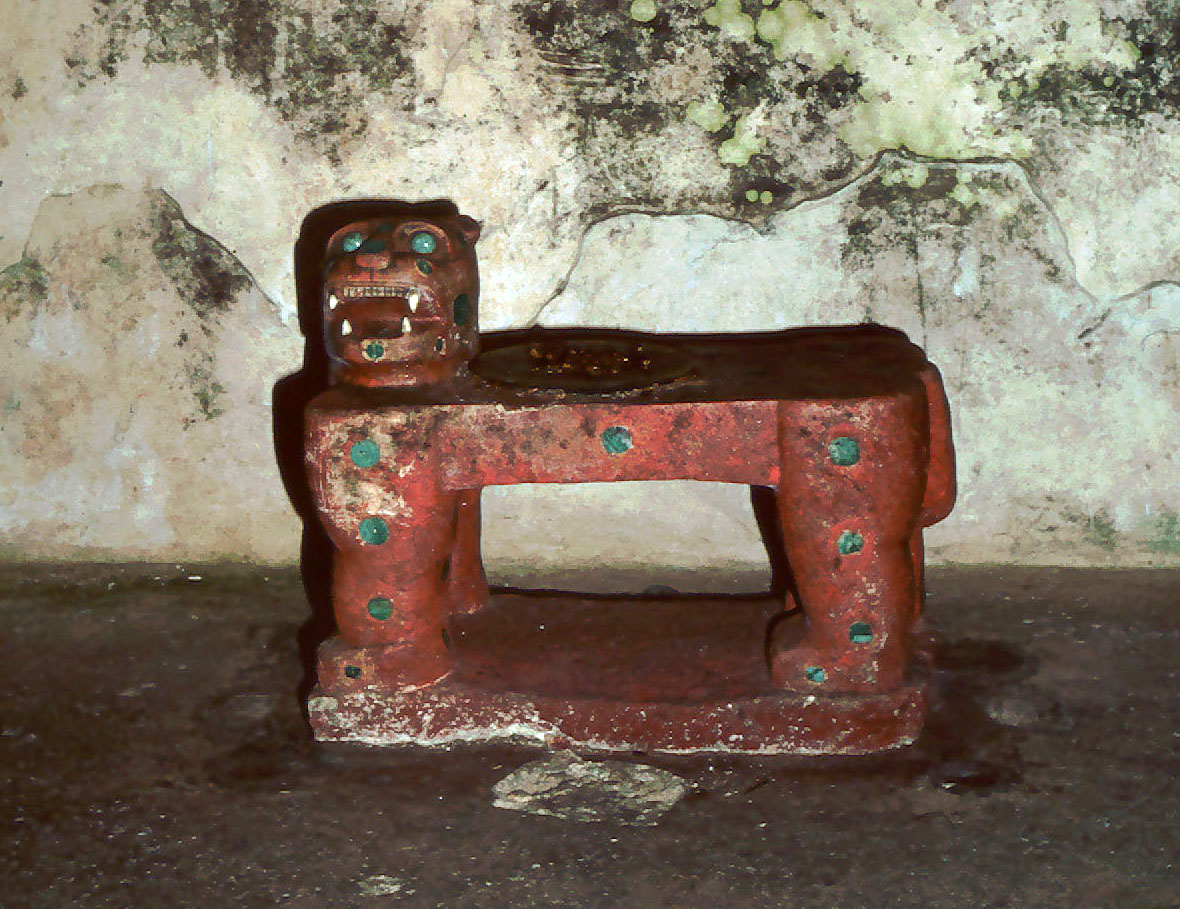
Kukulcan's Jaguar Throne, from the Maya site of Chichen Itza

Integration of the jaguar into the sacred and secular realms of the Maya peoples is proven in the archaeological record. The Maya, whose territory spanned the Yucatán Peninsula all the way to the Pacific coast of Guatemala, was a literate society who left documentation of their lives (mostly the lives of the aristocracy) and belief system in the form of books and bas-relief sculpture on temples, stelae, and pottery. Often depicted on these artifacts are the gods the Maya revered and it is no coincidence that these gods often have jaguar attributes. As stated earlier, the jaguar is said to have the ability to cross between worlds, and for the Maya daytime and nighttime represented two different worlds. The living and the earth are associated with the day, and the spirit world and the ancestors are associated with the night. As the jaguar is quite at home in the nighttime, the jaguar is believed to be part of the underworld; thus, "Maya gods with jaguar attributes or garments are underworld gods" (Benson 1998:64). One such god is Xbalanque, one of the Maya Hero Twins who descended to the underworld, and whose entire body is covered with patches of jaguar skin. Another is God L, who is "the primary lord of the underworld" and often is shown with a jaguar ear or jaguar attire, and atop a jaguar throne (Benson 1998: 64-65). Not only is the underworld associated with the ancestors, but it also is understood as, where plants originate. In addition, the Maya's source of fresh water comes from underground pools in the porous limestone that makes up the Yucatán, called cenotes. These associations with water and plants further reinforce the notion of the jaguar as a god of fertility.

The jaguar is further associated with vegetation and fertility by the Maya with what is known as the Waterlily jaguar, which is depicted as having water lilies sprouting from its head (Benson 1998:64-67).

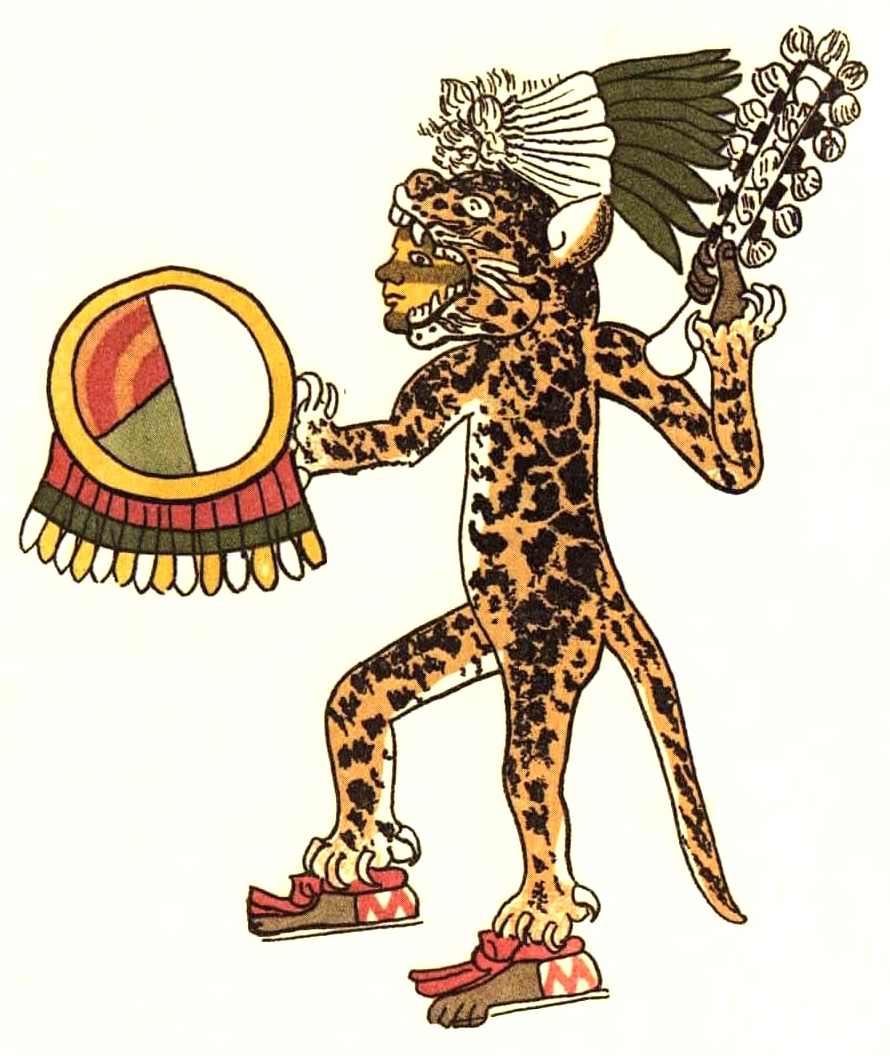
Aztec jaguar warrior, from the Codex Magliabechiano

No doubt, the jaguar's brilliant coat made it quite desirable, however, not all were allowed to don the jaguar pelt as it became the identification of the ruling class for the Maya. Not only did Maya kings wear jaguar pelts, but they also adopted the jaguar as part of their ruling name, as a symbol of their might and authority. One such ruling family to incorporate the jaguar into their name is known as, Jaguar Paw, who ruled the Maya city of Tikal in the fourth century. Jaguar Paw I was ousted by central Mexicans from Teotihuacán, and it was not until late in the fifth century that the Jaguar Paw family returned to power (Coe 1999: 90). Other Maya rulers to incorporate the jaguar name include, Scroll Jaguar, Bird Jaguar, and Moon Jaguar, just to name a few (Coe 1999: 247-48). In addition to the ruling class, the jaguar also was associated with warriors and hunters. Those who excelled in hunting and warfare often adorned themselves with jaguar pelts, teeth, or claws and were "regarded as possessing feline souls" (Saunders 1998: 26).

Archeologists have found a jar in Guatemala, attributed to the Maya of the Late Classic Era (600-900 AD), which depicts a musical instrument that has been reproduced and played. This instrument is astonishing in at least two respects. First, it is the only stringed instrument known in the Americas prior to the introduction of European musical instruments. Second, when played, it produces a sound virtually identical to a jaguar's growl. A sample of this sound is available at the Princeton Art Museum website.

== Jaguars and Teotihuacan ==
In the city-state of Teotihuacan jaguar bones have been found in caches of precious or significant objects, including obsidian and greenstone, in both the Pyramid of the Sun and the Pyramid of the Moon. These caches were placed in the pyramids as they were being built, likely as part of a ceremony to dedicate the pyramids. Analysis of the animal bones has shown that while some of the jaguars had been wild shortly before burial, many had lived in captivity for a long time prior to being placed in the dedicatory cache.

== Jaguars and the Olmecs ==
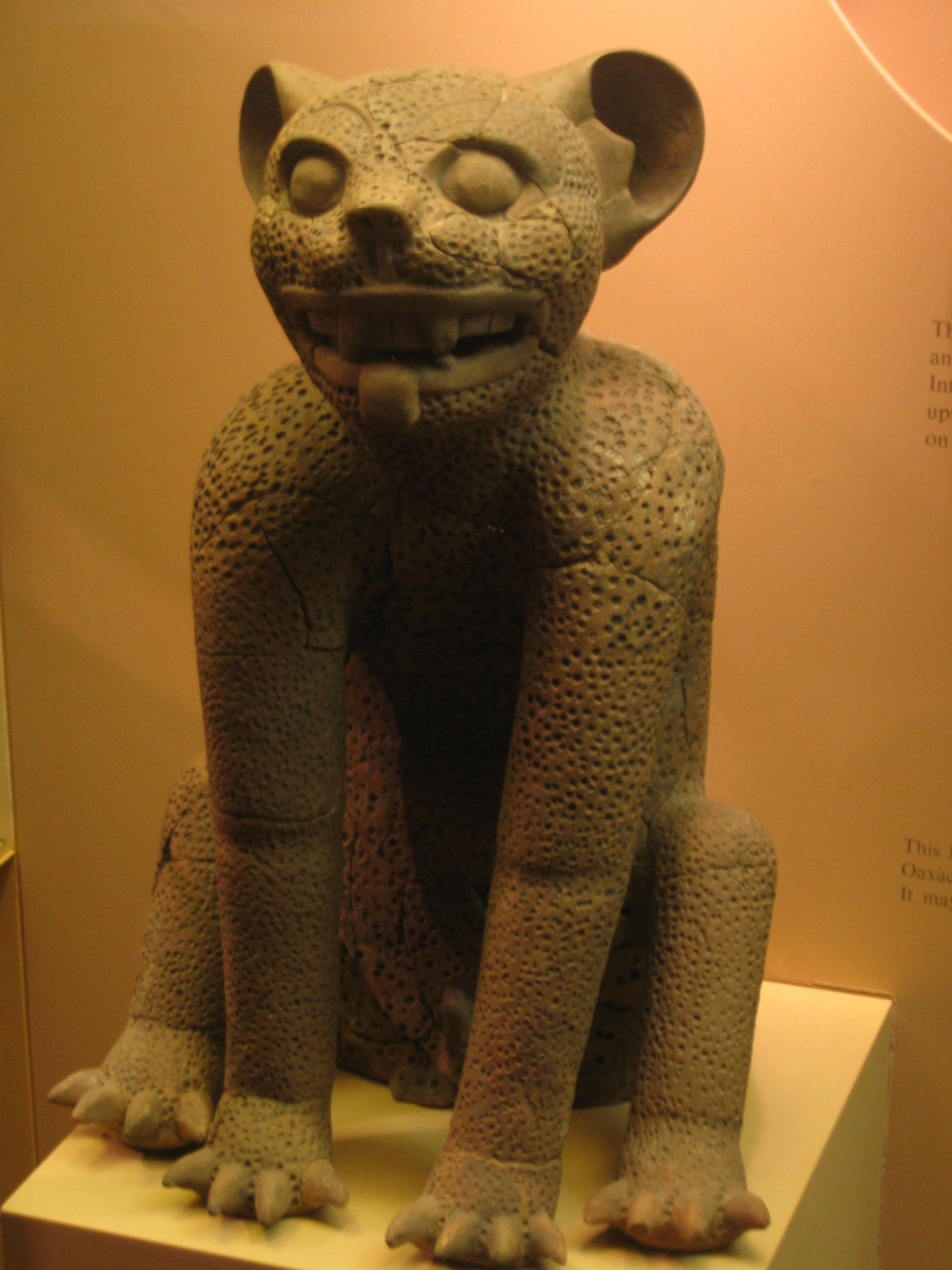
Clay jaguar from Monte Albán, provisionally dated from 200 BC to AD 600. Height: 56 cm (22 inches)

The Olmec civilization was first defined as a distinctive art style at the turn of the nineteenth century. The various sculpture, figurines, and celts from what now is recognized as the Olmec heartland on the southern Gulf Coast, reveal that these people knew their jungle companions well and incorporated them into their mythology.

In the surviving Olmec archaeological record, jaguars are rarely portrayed naturalistically, but rather with a combination of feline and human characteristics. These feline anthropomorphic figures may range from a human figure with slight jaguar characteristics to depictions of figures in the so-called transformative pose, kneeling with hands on knees, to figures that are nearly completely feline.

One of the most prominent, distinctive, and enigmatic Olmec designs to appear in the archaeological record has been the "were-jaguar". Seen not only in figurines, the motif also may be found carved into jade "votive axes" and celts, engraved onto various portable figurines of jade, and depicted on several "altars", such as those at La Venta. Were-jaguar babies are often held by a stoic, seated adult male.

The were-jaguar figure is characterized by a distinctive down-turned mouth with fleshy lips, almond-shaped eyes, and a cleft head similar – it is said – to that of the male jaguar which has a cleft running vertically the length of its head.

It is not known what the were-jaguar represented to the Olmec, and it may well have represented different things at different times.

== Other instances of the jaguar in Mesoamerican cultures ==
=== Tecuanes dances in present-day Mexico ===
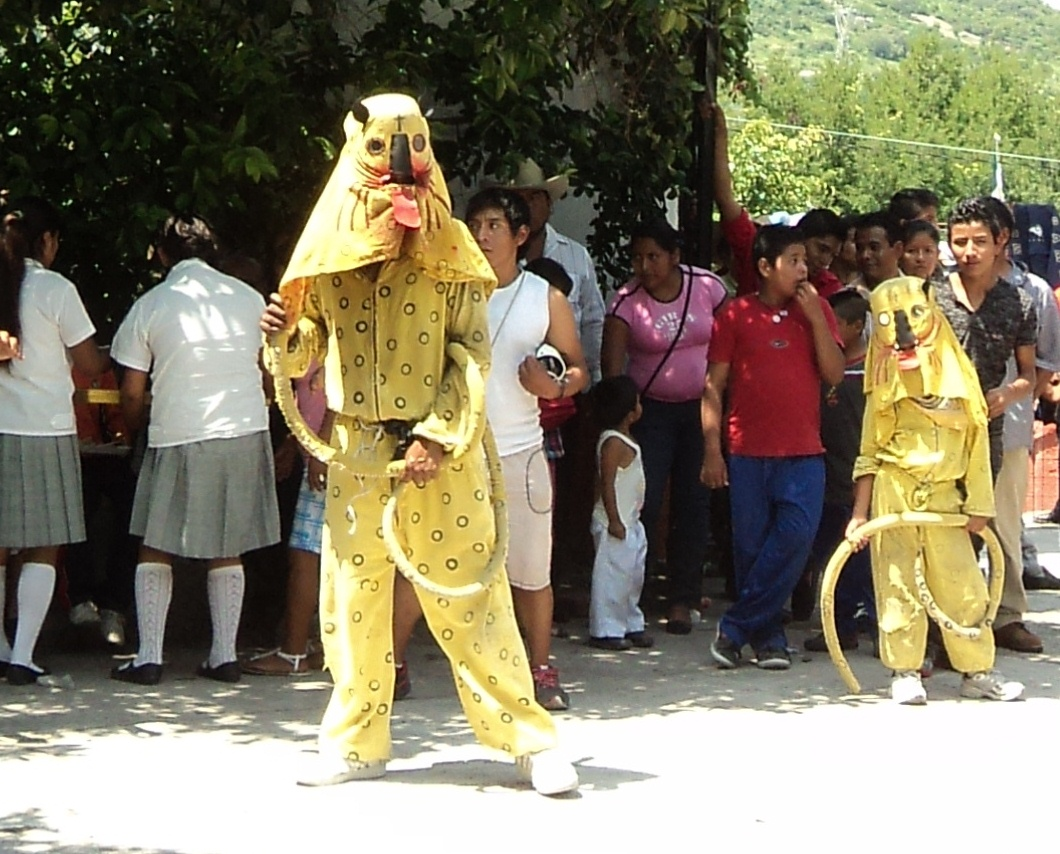
Tecuanes alpuyeca

Tēcuani (and its variants tekuani, tekuane, tecuane) means "jaguar" in Nahuatl. In the south-center of Mexico the "danza de los tecuanes" is performed in at least 96 communities. In this region jaguar dances are very popular. There are many variants of jaguar dances. Some of the most popular are the "tecuanes dances", "tlacololeros dances" and "tlaminques dances"

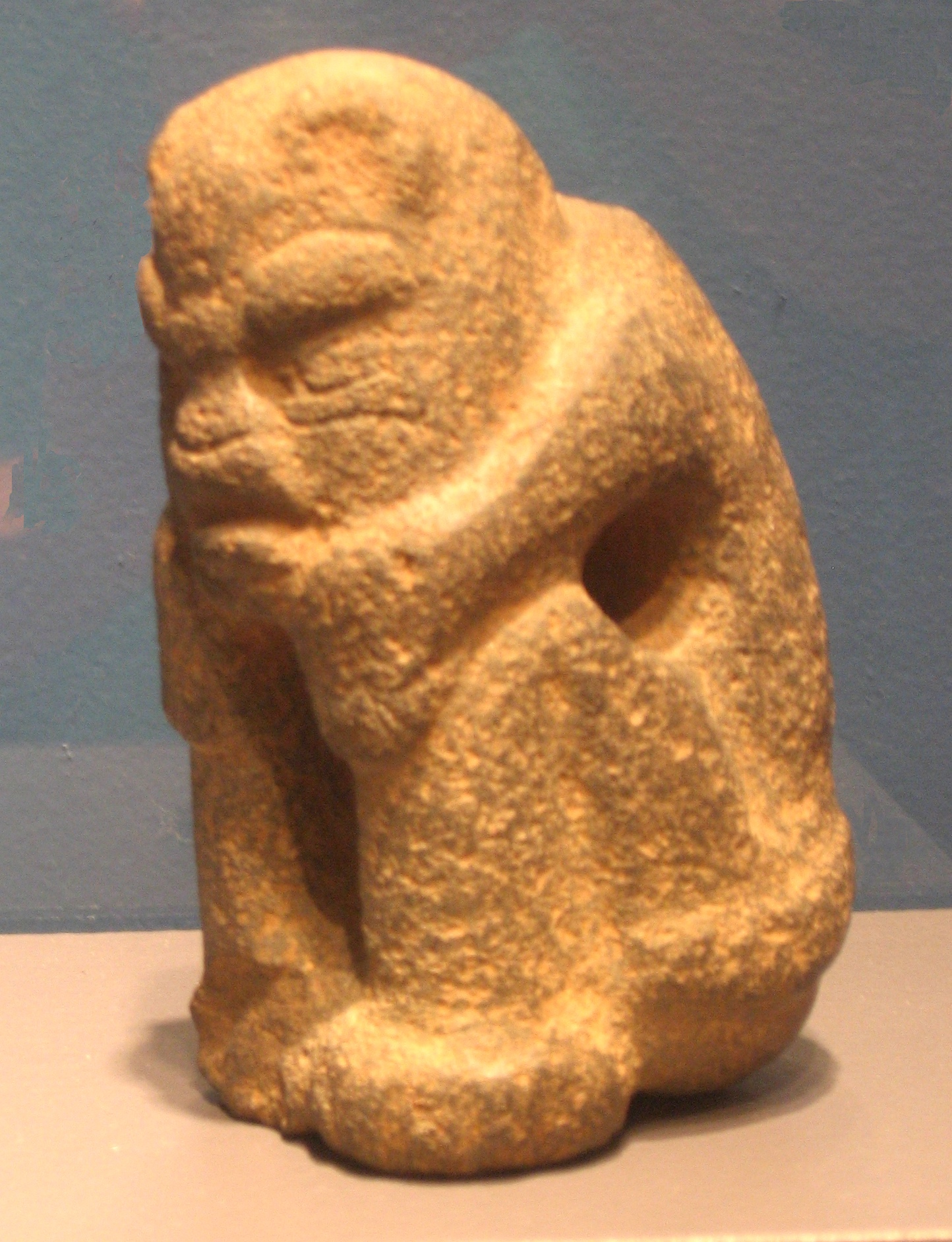
An Olmec transformation figure, thought to show the transformation of a religious authority into a jaguar.

=== Jaguars and naguals ===
The jaguar is important for certain religious authorities in many Mesoamerican cultures, who often associate the jaguar as a spirit companion or nagual, which will protect the religious figures from evil spirits and while they move between the earth and the spirit realm. In order for the religious authorities to combat whatever evil forces may be threatening, or for those who rely on the religious authorities for protection, it is necessary for some religious authorities to transform and cross over to the spirit realm. The jaguar is often a nagual because of its strength, for it is necessary that the religious authorities "dominate the spirits, in the same way as a predator dominates its prey" (Saunders 1998:30). The jaguar is said to possess the transient ability of moving between worlds because of its comfort both in the trees and the water, the ability to hunt as well in the nighttime as in the daytime, and the habit of sleeping in caves, places often associated with the deceased ancestors. The concept of the transformation of a religious authority is well-documented in Mesoamerica and South America and is in particular demonstrated in the various Olmec jaguar transformation figures (Diehl, p. 106).

== See also ==
- Ocelot
- Underwater panther
- Wayob
