= Bakna =

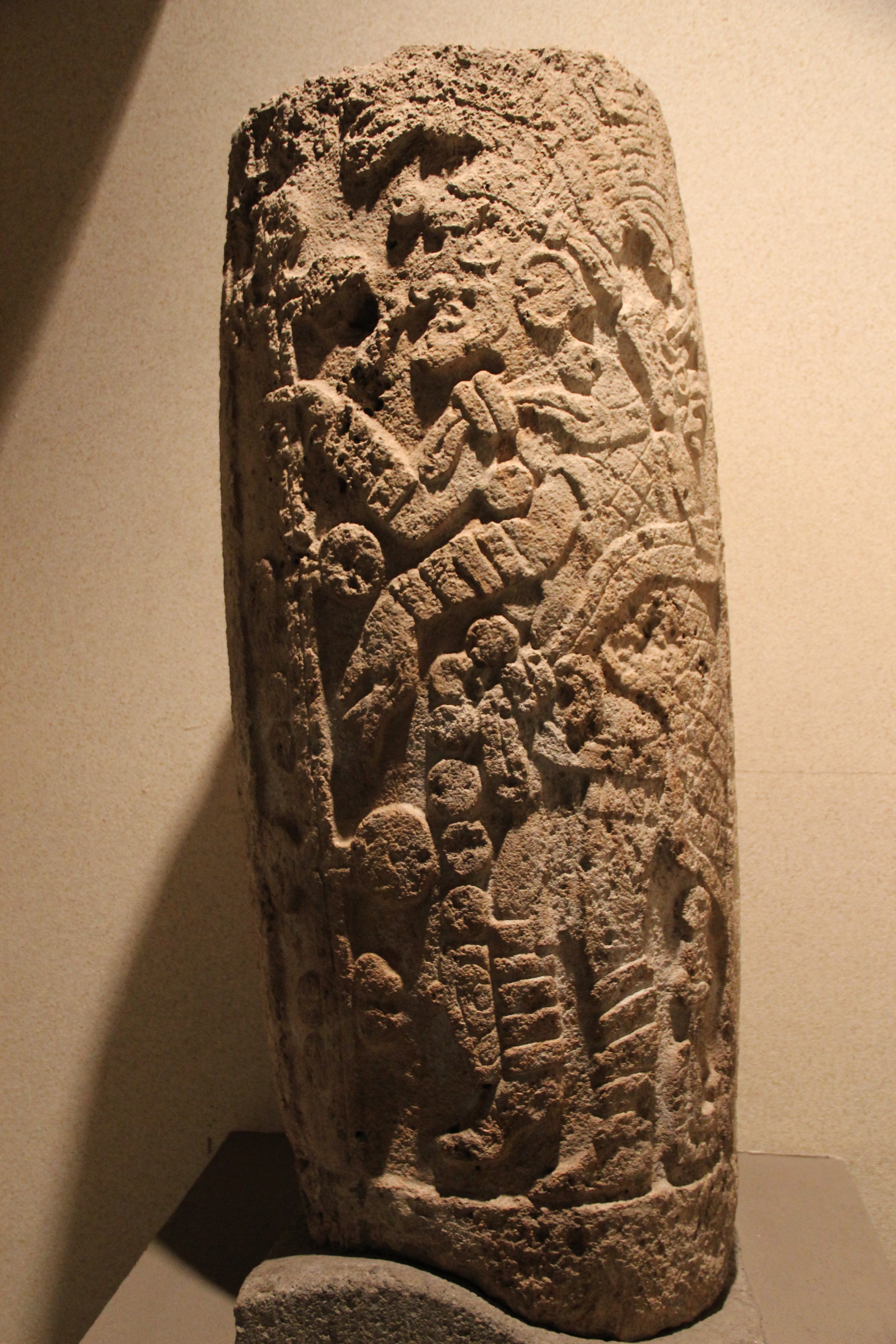
- Stone column of Bakna showing God L
- Type: Ancient maya site
- Periods: Classic - Postclassic
- Cultures: Maya civilization
- Location: Mexico
- Region: Puuc

Site notes
- Architectural style: Puuc

Bakna is an ancient archaeological site of the Maya civilization located in the Puuc region of Campeche in Mexico, near the city of Hopelchén. The ancient settlement of Bakna developed as a ceremonial center during the late Classic period and the early Postclassic as part of the Puuc region sites.

== Archaeology ==
Since its discovery, the archaeological zone of Bakna has received very few investigations and not much is known in detail about the history of the site. Inside the structures of the site has been identified the existence of carved stone monuments and stelae with representations of deities and mythological figures.

=== Column from Bakna with God L ===
The Column of Bakna is a large carved Stone monument dated in 800–1000 AD showing the image of a major ancient Maya deity identified as the God L associated with trade and the rule of the underworld. The carving shows God L with the image of a hunched elderly man wearing a cape, a traditional head cloth called Su't and holding a long staff while carrying the god K'awiil (also known as God K) on his back, this god is often related to God L and appear together in other monuments from Bakna. According to Maya mythology and oral tradition, the God L was a powerful deity with the ability to transform into different animals such as a jaguar or armadillo and was in charge of leading the world before a mythological event where the major deities reconfigured the earth.

The Column of Bakna is on display as part of the collection of the Maya Room at the National Museum of Anthropology of Mexico City.
