= Acantun =

Ritual stone shafts placed at Yucatec Maya villages

Acantuns are ritual stone shafts placed at the four corners of a Yucatec Maya village. When night fell, four Balams (Jaguars) were said to arrive and sit on the idols to keep guard over the village.
