= Maximón =

Mayan deity and folk saint

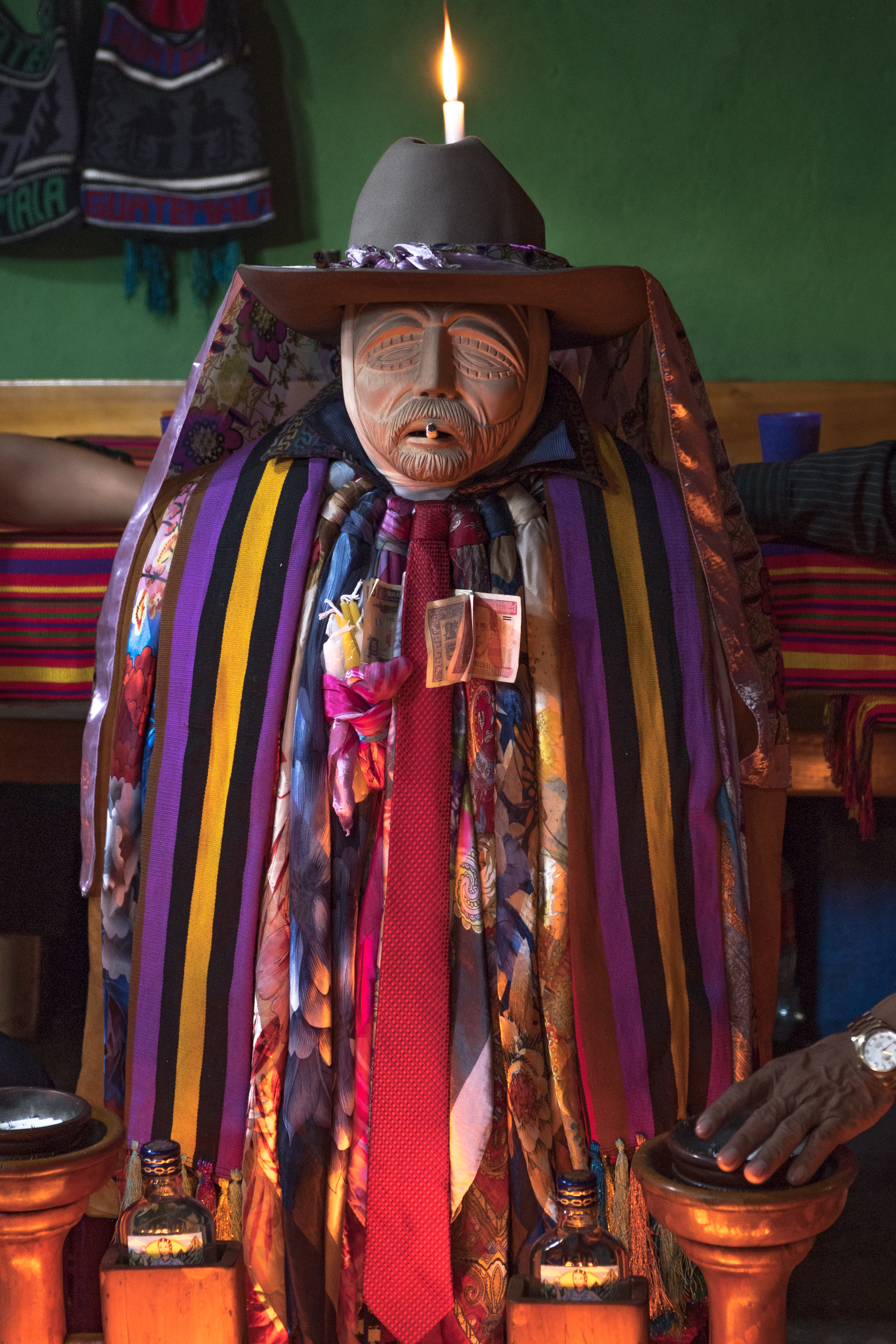
- Maximón effigy and candles, Santiago Atitlán

Ri Laj Mam, Don Ximon, San Simón, El Gran Abuelo
- Born: October 28th
- Venerated in: Traditionalist Maya Communities, Folk Catholicism
- Attributes: sunglasses, bandana, colorful garlands, cigarettes/cigar
- Patronage: health, crops, marriage, business, revenge, death

Maximón (/ˌmæʃɪˈmoʊn, -ˈmɒn/) is a Maya deity and folk saint, represented in various forms by the Maya peoples of several towns in the Guatemalan Highlands. Oral tradition of his creation and purpose in these communities is complex, diverse, and born of the ancient Maya traditions centuries ago.

== Origin ==
The worship of Maximón is believed to have begun at the time of the Spanish conquest of the Maya. The designation of Maximón as a saint is the result of religious syncretism.

The modern character of Maximón is thought by analysts to be a blend of several historical, biblical, and Maya mythological figures. These include Pedro de Alvarado, Judas Iscariot, Saint Peter, and Mam.

Maximón's appearance varies greatly by location. While he is popularly depicted as a man in a suit and hat, this is not a constant. In Santiago Atitlán, he wears colorful garlands and scarves, while in Zunil, he wears sunglasses and a bandana.

== Mythology ==
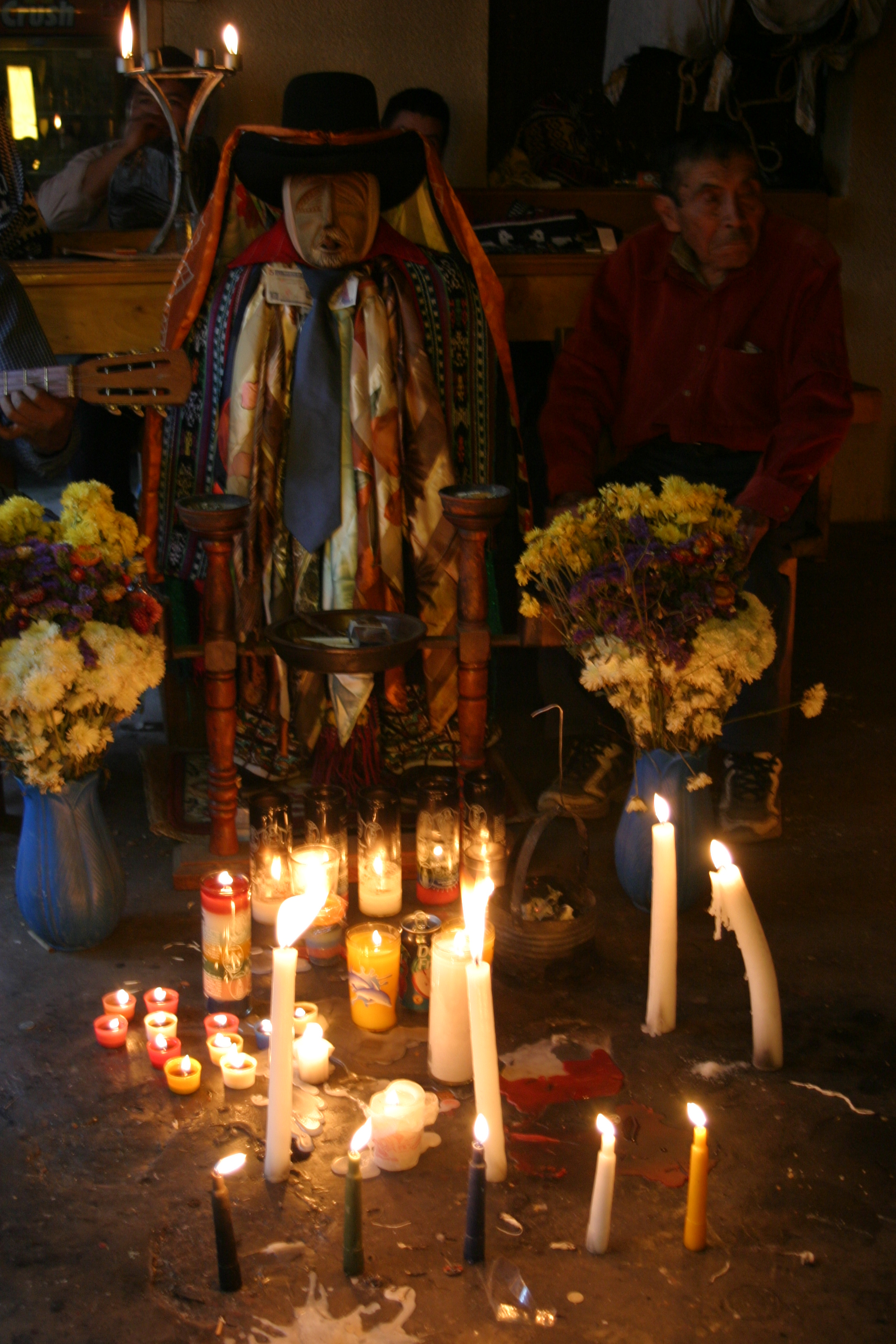
Maximón, at Lago Atitlán

Maximón is said to represent both light and dark, and to be a trickster. He is both a womanizer and a protector of couples.

According to some legends, Maximón was an elder who reincarnated to protect his people. During the Spanish Conquest, an elder named Ri Laj Mam, upset by the evils of the Spaniards, encouraged his people to start a rebellion. He was eventually executed, but returned to life in the form of a judge named Don Ximon, who fought to give land back to the native people of Guatemala.

Another legend states that Maximón was hired by traveling fishermen to protect the virtue of their wives. Instead, Maximón disguised himself and slept with all of them.

In Santiago Atitlán, an alternative tale says that Maximón was never a man, but a wooden figure created by shamans to defend the village from witches. However, Maximón used trickery to harm the people of the village, so the shamans twisted his head around and broke his legs to stop him. He then did his job properly and protected the people of the town from evil.

== Veneration ==
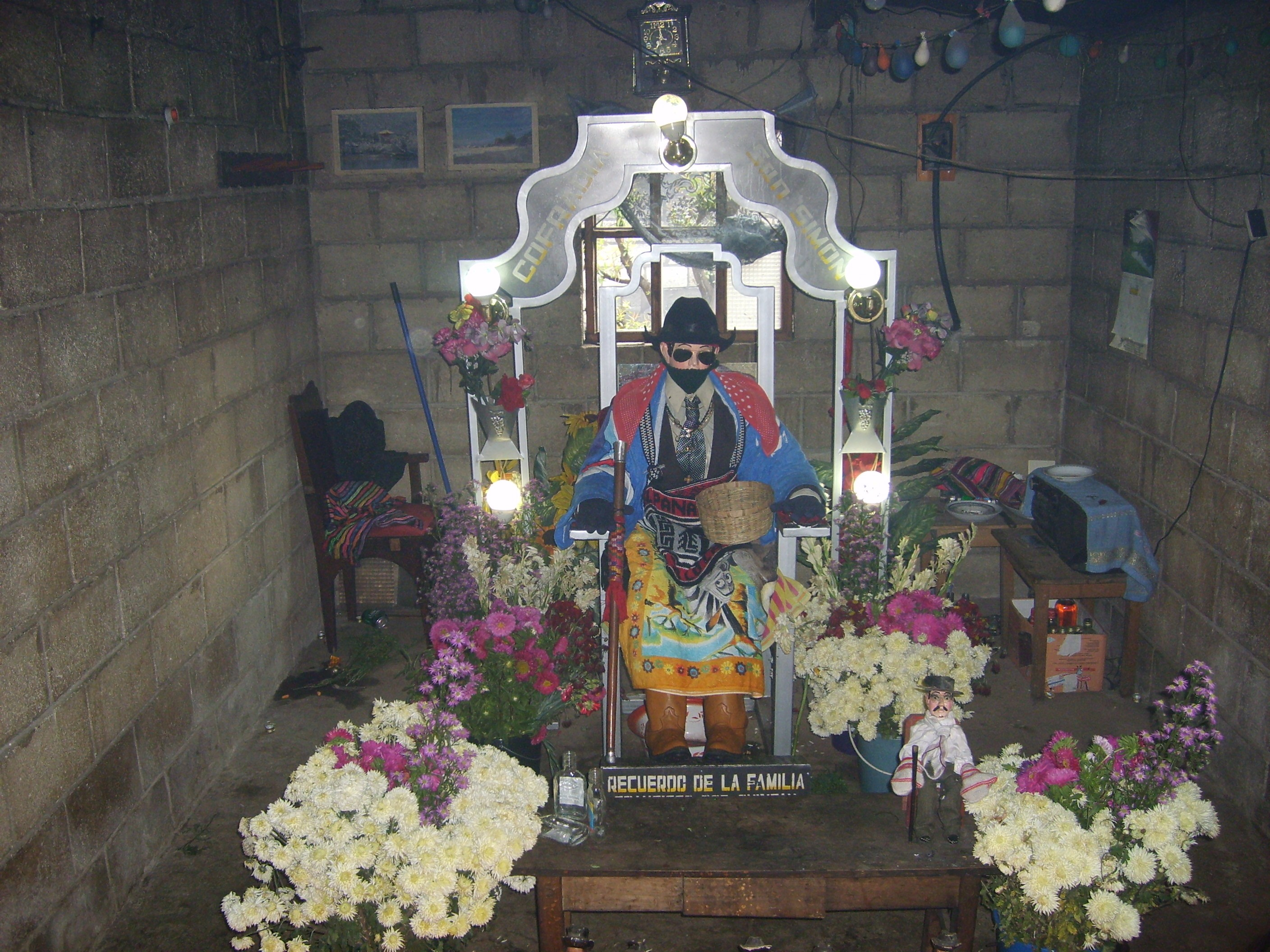
San Simón in Zunil, 2007

Maximón is venerated in the form of an effigy or cult image. Worship varies greatly by location. In Santiago Atitlán, Maximón's effigy resides in a different household every year. His image is normally only taken out of this house during Holy Week, whereafter it will change households, but is on display year-round due to the popularity of pilgrimages. The effigy has special attendants that stay by the altar year-round, drinking and smoking alongside it. They deliver offerings from the public to the image. Popular offerings include money, tobacco, and moonshine.

In the town of San Andrés Itzapa, there is a large temple to Maximón. Here, offerings such as corn, flowers, and candles are burned in public by shamans for the deity. Pilgrims travel to this temple from all across Latin America.

Guatemalan press has claimed that the worship of Maximón has declined in recent decades, but this is difficult to measure with much certainty.

=== Outside of Guatemala ===
As many Guatemalans have migrated to areas such as Mexico, the United States, and Canada, the veneration of Maximón has traveled beyond the borders of Guatemala, where he is more commonly known as San Simón. There are temples dedicated to him in New York, California, and Florida.

== See also ==
- Folk Catholicism
- Folk religion
- Folk saint
- Maya religion
- Santa Muerte
- Jesús Malverde
