= Bacab =

Mayan deities

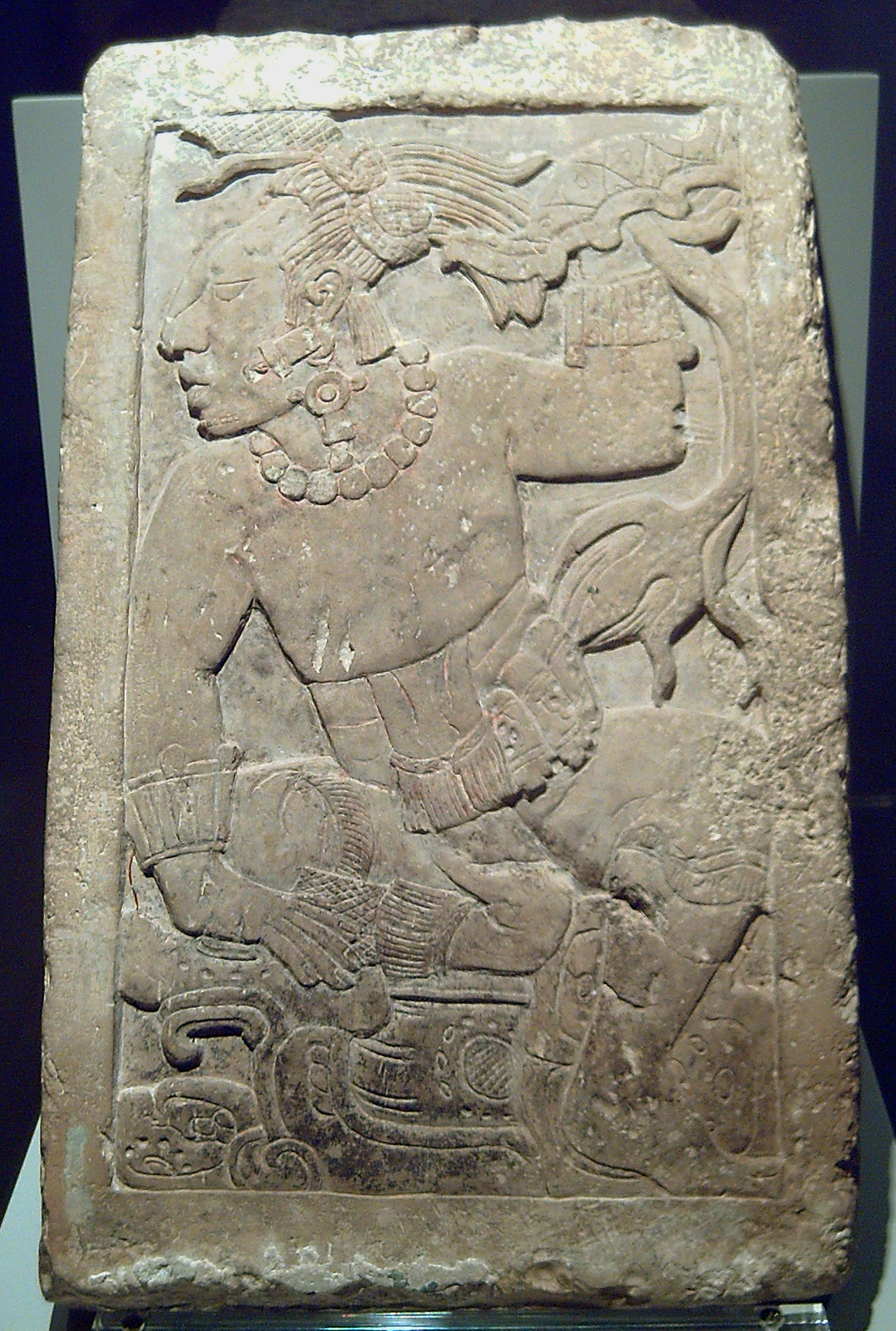
Throne support from Palenque showing a young, named official acting as a bacab (Museum of the Americas, Madrid, Spain).

Bacab (Mayan pronunciation: [ɓaˈkaɓ]) is the generic Yucatec Maya name for the four prehispanic aged deities of the interior of the Earth and its water deposits. The Bacabs have more recent counterparts in the lecherous, drunken old thunder deities of the Gulf Coast regions. The Bacabs are also referred to as Pawahtuns (Mayan pronunciation: [pawahtuːn]).

== Yucatec traditions ==
=== Myth ===
The Bacabs "were four brothers whom God placed, when he created the world, at the four points of it, holding up the sky so that it should not fall. [...] They escaped when the world was destroyed by the deluge." Their names were Hobnil, Cantzicnal, Saccimi, and Hosanek.

The Bacabs played an important role in the cosmological upheaval associated with Katun 11 Ahau, when Oxlahuntiku 'Thirteen-god' was humbled by Bolontiku 'Nine-god'. According to the Book of Chilam Balam of Chumayel, "then the sky would fall, it would fall down, it would fall down upon the earth, when the four gods, the four Bacabs, were set up, who brought about the destruction of the world."

According to Francisco Hernández (quoted by Las Casas and Diego López de Cogolludo), the Bacab (apparently a unitary concept) was the son of the creator god, Itzamna, and of the goddess Ixchebelyax; he had once been humbled, killed, and revived.

=== Ritual ===
The veneration of the Bacabs was closely connected to that of the so-called Year Bearers and their prognostics. Each Bacab ruled one of the directions and the associated Year Bearer day (one of four New Year days), as follows:

Name	Direction	Color	Years
Cantzicnal	North	White	Muluc
Ho' Chan Ek	West	Black	Kawaq
Hobnil	East	Red	Kan
Zac-Cimi	South	Yellow	Ix

The Bacabs were invoked in connection with rain and agriculture, since they were intimately associated with the four Chaacs, or rain deities, and the Pawahtuns, or wind deities, all located in the four directions. The Maya of Chan Kom referred to the four skybearers as the four Chacs (Redfield and Villa Rojas).

Since they were Year Bearer patrons, and also because of their meteorological qualities, the Bacabs were important in divination ceremonies; they were approached with questions about crops, weather, or the health of bees (Landa).

In addition, the "Four Gods, Four Bacabs" were often invoked in curing rituals that had the four-cornered world and its beaches for a theatre, which is the basic reason why the most important early-colonial collection of Yucatec curing texts, the Ritual of the Bacabs, has been named after them.

== Gulf Coast traditions ==
Of the 'Grandfathers' of the Gulf Coast corresponding to the Bacabs, the most powerful one is responsible for opening the rainy season. The four Earth-carrying old men are sometimes conceived as drowned ancestors who are serving for one year; then, other drowned men are substituted for them. Together with this comes the concept that the powerful 'Grandfather' only grows old over the course of the year.

== Earlier representations ==
Iconographically, the Bacab corresponds to god N in the Schellhas-Zimmermann-Taube classification, an aged deity of thunder, mountains, and the interior of the earth (Taube 1992). Often represented fourfold, he can wear the attribute of a conch, a turtle, a snail, a spider web, or a bee 'armour'. In the rain almanacs of the Post-Classic Dresden Codex, the old man with the conch and the turtle is put on a par with Chaac. The Bacabs who carry the sky are represented by forms of God N holding up the sky dragon. Moreover, standing between and separating earth and sky, God N is often identified with both the sky dragon and the earth dragon, thus giving structure to the universe.

In addition to the above, God N, or the Bacab, occurs in various stereotypical situations:

- Fourfold, the Bacabs are repeatedly shown carrying the slab of a throne or the roof of a building. In this, young, princely impersonators can substitute for them (see fig.), a fact reminiscent of the drowned ancestors serving as earth-carriers mentioned above. On a damaged relief panel from Pomona, four of these young Bacab impersonators appear to have held the four Classic Year Bearer days in their hands.
- A Bacab inhabiting a turtle (perhaps representing the earth) is part of the scenes with the resurrection of the Maya maize god.
- There are also representations of these Bacabs, individually, in the famous Chama vessels, hidden in shells or a snail, which classifies them as the old God N, (being at the same time, a Late Classic version of Xpiyakok), where a young warrior (who has been equated with Xb'alamQ'e) threatening him with a spear, knife or razor, tries to get him out of his shell, where the shell symbolizes a cave. The young warrior often has his body painted black, although he does not display any other attribute of the young jaguar god. However, it has been proposed that it is Xb'alamQ'e in his personification as a young warrior. Erwin Dieseldorff collected a story from oral tradition in which Xb'alamQ'e tried to drag Xucaneb, the highest hill in Verapaz, who is the supreme Tzuul Taq'a (Lord of the Hill). In the story, the old man resisted with all his might and, by stretching his legs, the mountain range that runs from Xucaneb to Senahú was formed. It is said that the old man had to make an effort, which shows how steep the mountain is on the Tamahú side. The most beautiful vessel with this theme is K2847, in which a young warrior painted in red and with a knife in his hand tries to drag the old god N from outside. The ethnohistorian Ruud van Akkeren proposes that this scene typical of Chamá vessels alludes to the first act of Rabinal Achí.

The Bacab has a peculiar netted element as a distinguishing attribute serving as a headdress, which might conceivably belong to the sphere of the hunt or of beekeeping. It recurs as a superfix in his hieroglyphical names; its reading is uncertain. Hieroglyphically, one finds conflations of Itzamna (god D) and Bacab (god N), recalling the mythological filiation of the Bacab mentioned by Francisco Hernández.

== See also ==
- Four Heavenly Kings
- Lokapala
- Four sons of Horus
- Titan (mythology)
- Guardians of the directions
- Anemoi
- Four Dwarves (Norse mythology)
- Four Stags (Norse mythology)
