= Itzamna =

God of Time, God D

- God of creation
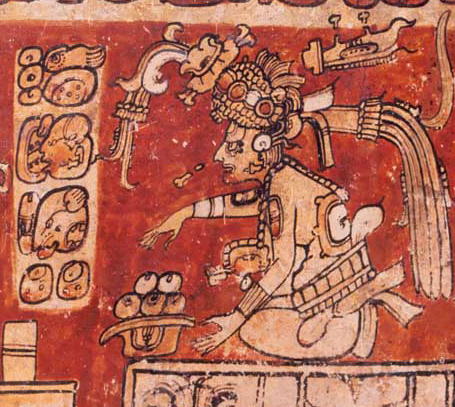
- Itzamna seated in a Classic Period polychrome ceramic (Kerr 504)
- Other names: Itzamnaaj
- Animals: Hummingbird(?)
- Age: Aged deity
- Gender: Male
- Consort: Ix Chel

Itzamná (Mayan pronunciation: [it͡samˈna]) is, in Maya mythology, an upper god and creator deity thought to reside in the sky. Itzamná is one of the most important gods in the Classic and Postclassic Maya pantheon. Although little is known about him, scattered references are present in early-colonial Spanish reports (relaciones) and dictionaries. Twentieth-century Lacandon lore includes tales about a creator god (Nohochakyum or Hachakyum) who may be a late successor to him. In the pre-Spanish period, Itzamná was often depicted in books and in ceramic scenes derived from them. Before the names of the Maya deities were deciphered, Itzamná was known, and is still sometimes referred to by archeologists, as "God D".

== Name ==
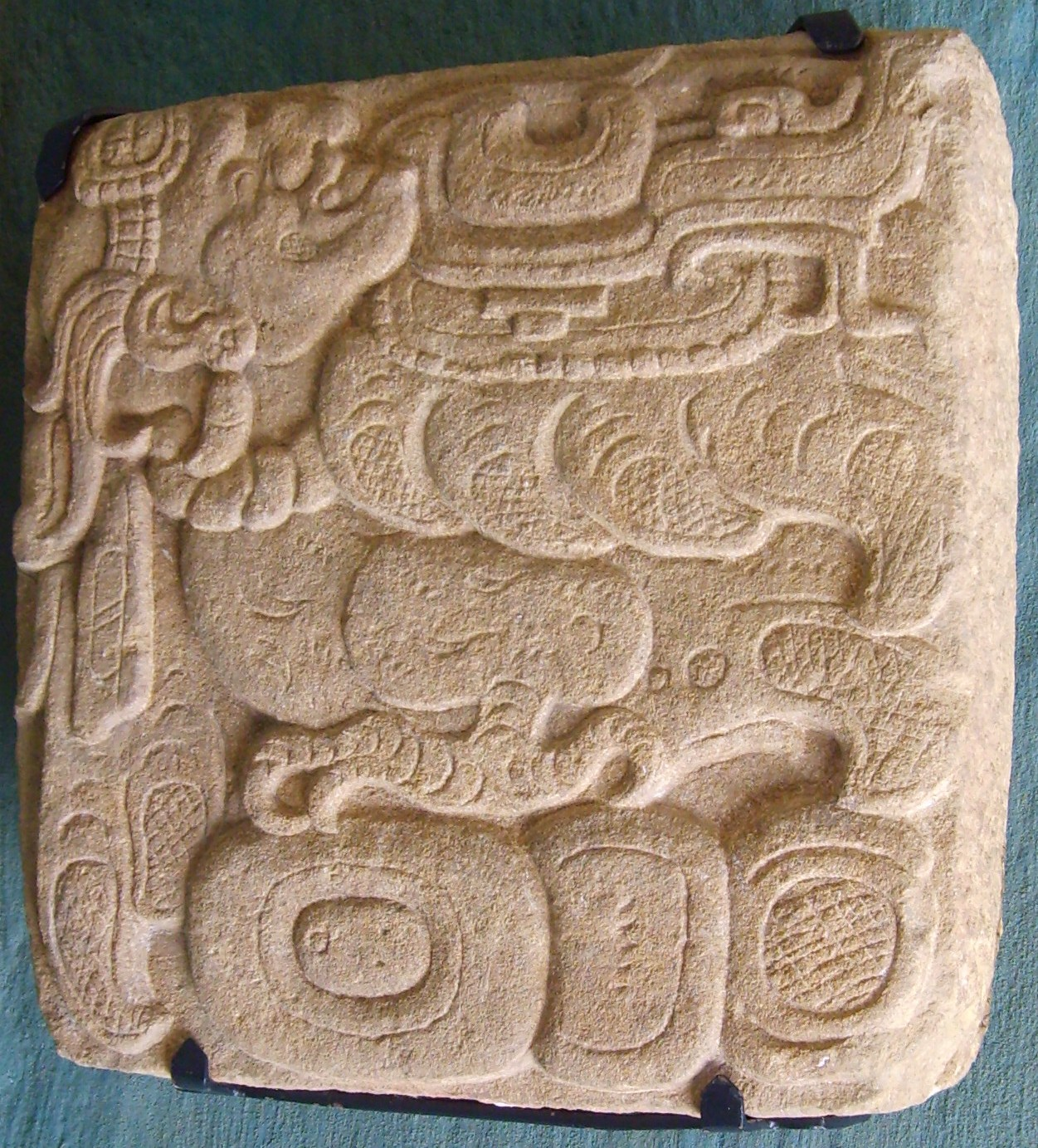
A Classic Period glyph with a representation of Itzamná with the body of a bird, found in the Plaza of the Dead Sun in Toniná and now in the site museum.

J. Eric S. Thompson originally interpreted the name Itzamná as "lizard house", itzam being a Yucatecan word for iguana and na meaning "house". However, Thompson's translation has gradually been abandoned. While there is no consensus on the exact meaning of the name Itzamná, it may be significant that itz is a root denoting all sorts of secretions (such as dew, sap, and semen) and also sorcery. The otherwise unattested, agentive form itzam could thus mean "asperser" or "sorcerer". Although one finds god D's Classic name glyph commonly rendered as "Itzamnaaj", this reading still awaits confirmation.

== Early colonial reports ==
The early colonial sources variously connect, and sometimes identify, Itzamná with Hunab Ku (an invisible high god), Kinich Ahau (the sun deity), and Yaxcocahmut (a bird of omen).

The most reliable source on Itzamná, Diego de Landa, mentions him several times in the framework of his description of the ritual year. In the month of Uo, a ritual aspersion of the books took place under invocation of Kinich Ahau Itzamná, "the first priest". In the month of Zip, Itzamná was invoked as one of the gods of medicine, and in the month of Mac, he was venerated by the very old on a par with the Chaacs, the rain deities. In the cycle of four years, one year was under the patronage of Itzamná.

Itzamná was an active creator god, as is shown by the following. Confirming Landa's description of the book ritual above, (Hun-)Itzamná is stated by Diego López de Cogolludo to have invented the priestly art of writing. According to this same author, Itzamná (now written Zamna) had been a sort of priest who divided the land of Yucatán and assigned names to all of its features. More generally, Itzamná was the creator of humankind, and also the father of Bacab (Francisco Hernández), a fourfold deity of the interior of the Earth. In an alternative tradition, Itzamná begot thirteen sons with Ixchel, two of whom created the Earth and humankind (Las Casas).

== Pre-colonial era ==
In the New Year pages of the Dresden Codex, Itzamna is given a role similar to that described by Landa. The version of Itzamna depicted in the codices is very similar to the much earlier depictions in Classic iconography. In comparison with the early-colonial descriptions, Classic scenes are more suggestive of narrative traditions, at times subjecting Itzamna to the actions of others: He can, for example, be shown clinging to the back of a peccary or a deer; held ready for sacrifice; or being shot at in his bird avatar.

=== High priest and ruler ===
Itzamna is sometimes dressed as a high priest, and hieroglyphically identified as the god of rulership. Speaking generally, Classic iconography confirms Itzamna's identity as an upper god, seated on his celestial throne while governing, among other things, the affairs of agriculture and the hunt.

=== Crust of the Earth: Caiman ===
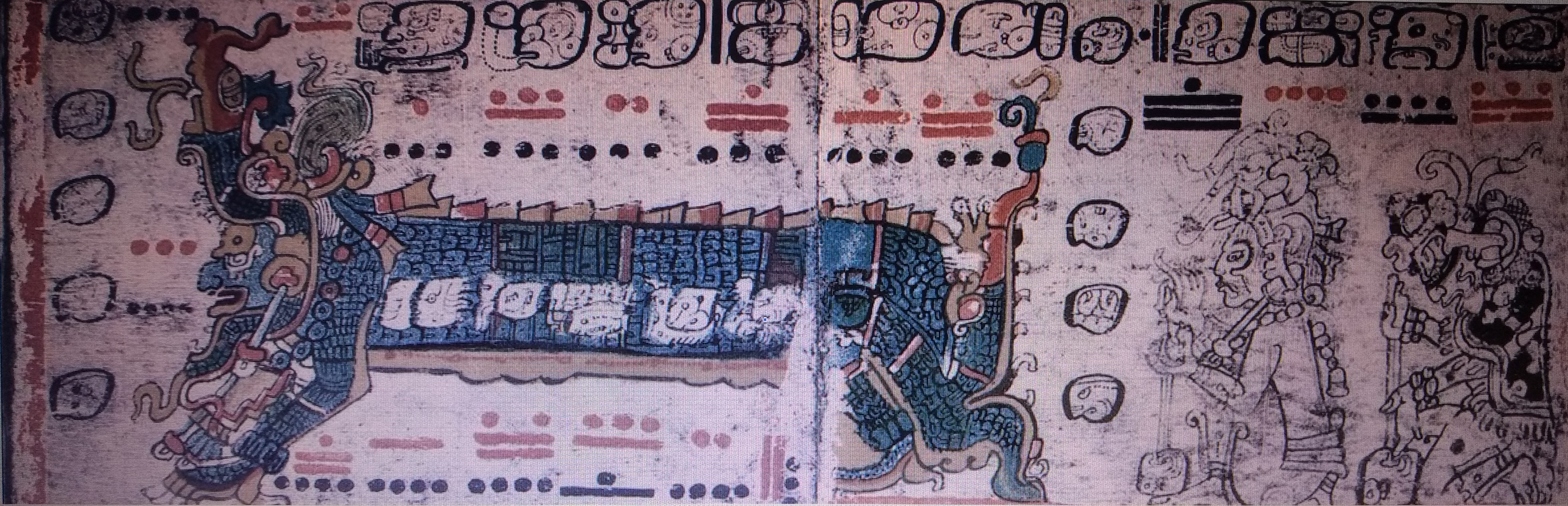
Itzamna as terrestrial crocodile Itzam Cab Ain, Dresden Codex.

On two of the Dresden Codex's very first pages, the head of Itzamna appears within the serpent maw of a two-headed caiman representing the Earth, and seemingly corresponding to the Itzam Cab Ain (Itzam Earth Caiman) of a creation myth in some of the Books of Chilam Balam; a case has been made for identifying this caiman as Itzamna's transformation (Thompson, Taube).

=== Father of Bacab ===
Both Itzamna and his avian manifestation sometimes show features of the Bacab (god N), who, as mentioned above, appears to have been considered a son of Itzamna at the time of the Spanish conquest.

=== Aged tonsured maize god ===
Iconographically, Itzamna can be considered an aged form of the tonsured maize god. Both deities are often shown together.

=== Principal Bird Deity ===
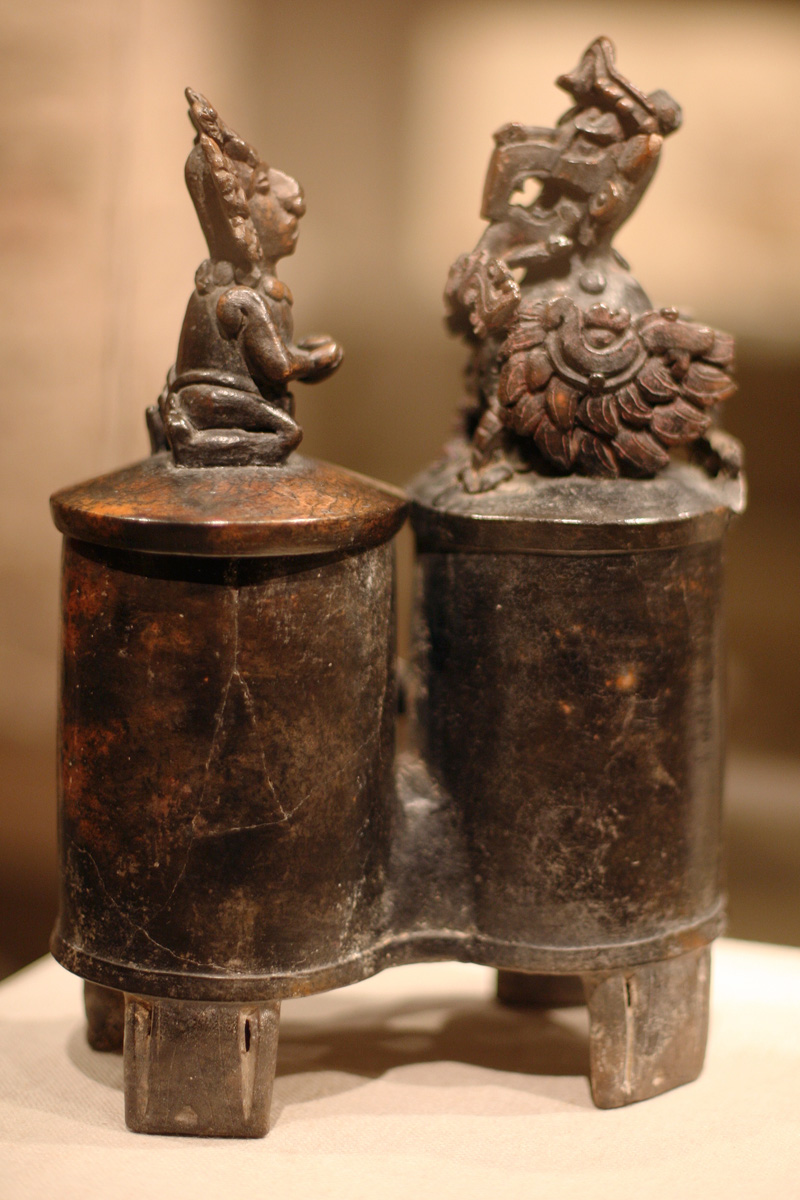
Principal Bird Deity and worshipper, Classic period, Metropolitan Museum of Art, NY

From the Late Postclassic Paris Codex back in time to the Pre-Classic San Bartolo murals, Itzamna has the so-called Principal Bird Deity - perhaps the Yaxcocahmut mentioned above - for a transformative shape (see figure). The bird often holds a bicephalous (two-headed) snake in its beak. Its head sometimes resembles that of a rain deity; at other times, it is more like that of a bird of prey, perhaps the laughing falcon believed to be a harbinger of rain. The wings are repeatedly inscribed with the signs for "daylight" and "night", suggesting that the bird's flight could represent the unfolding of time. The San Bartolo murals have a Principal Bird Deity seated on top of each of four world trees, recalling the four world trees (together with a fifth, central tree) which, according to some of the early-colonial Chilam Balam books, were re-erected after the collapse of the sky. These world trees were associated with specific birds. Four world trees also appear in the Mexican Borgia Codex. The shooting of the Principal Bird deity is one of the main episodes of the Classic Period Hero Twins myth; but strong arguments plead against the Principal Bird Deity's equation with Vucub Caquix, a bird demon shot by the Popol Vuh Twins.

=== Human representatives ===
Itzamna and his avian transformation could be represented by human beings. Various kings of Yaxchilan, Dos Pilas, and Naranjo had Itzamnaaj as part of their names or titles. On Palenque's Temple XIX platform, a dignitary presenting the king with his royal headband wears the Principal Bird Deity's headdress, while being referred to as Itzamnaaj. In his bird avatar, god D here appears as the creator god bestowing rulership on a king.

== Bibliography ==
- Ferdinand Anders, Das Pantheon der Maya.
- Lawrence Bardawil, The Principal Bird Deity in Maya Art: An Iconographical Study of Form and Meaning (1976). www.mesoweb.com/pari/publications/RT03/PrincipalBirdDeity.pdf
- Karen Bassie-Sweet, Maya Sacred Geography and the Creator Deities. Norman 2008.
- Espinosa Díaz, Margarita (2001). "Creación y Destrucción en Toniná". Arqueología Mexicana (in Spanish). 9 (50): 16.
- Freidel, Schele, Parker, Maya Cosmos.
- Nicholas Hellmuth, Monsters and Men in Maya Art.
- Houston, Stuart, Taube, The Memory of Bones.
- Simon Martin and Nikolai Grube, Chronicle of the Maya Kings and Queens.
- David Stuart, The Inscriptions from Temple XIX at Palenque.
- Karl Taube, The Major Gods of Ancient Yucatan. 1992.
- Karl Taube, A Representation of the Principal Bird Deity in the Paris Codex.
- Eric Thompson, Maya History and Religion. Norman 1970.
- Alfred Tozzer, Landa's Relacion de las Cosas de Yucatan.
