= Ixchel =

Mayan goddess

- Goddess of Fertility, midwifery, medicine, and water
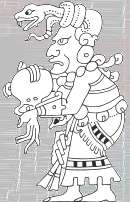
- Ixchel in the Dresden Codex
- Other names: Ix Chel
- Major cult center: Cozumel, Tabasco
- Animals: Jaguar
- Consort: Itzamna

Ixchel or Ix Chel (Note: Mayan pronunciation: [iʃˈt͡ʃel]) is the 16th-century name of the aged jaguar goddess of midwifery and medicine in ancient Maya culture.

She corresponds to Toci, an Aztec earth goddess inhabiting the sweatbath. She is related to another Aztec goddess invoked at birth, viz. Cihuacoatl (or Ilamatecuhtli).

In Taube's revised Schellhas-Zimmermann classification of codical deities, Ixchel corresponds to the Goddess O.

== Identification ==
In the 1500s, Diego de Landa called Ixchel "the Goddess of making children". He also mentioned her as the goddess of medicine, as shown by the following. In the month of Zip, the feast Ihcil Ixchel was celebrated by the physicians and shamans (hechiceros), and divination stones as well as medicine bundles containing little idols of "the Goddess of medicine whom they called Ixchel" were brought forward. In the Ritual of the Bacabs, Ixchel is once called "grandmother". In their combination, the goddess's two principal domains (birthing and healing) suggest an analogy with the aged Aztec goddess of midwifery, Toci.

Ixchel was already known to the Classical Maya. As Taube has demonstrated, she corresponds to Goddess O of the Dresden Codex, an aged woman with jaguar ears. A crucial piece of evidence in his argument is the so-called "Birth Vase", a Classic Maya container showing a childbirth presided over by various old women, headed by an old jaguar Goddess, the codical Goddess O; all have weaving implements in their headdresses. On another Classic Maya vase, (Note: Kerr 6020) Goddess O is shown acting as a physician, further confirming her identity as Ixchel. The combination of Ixchel with several aged midwives on the Birth Vase recalls the Tzʼutujil assembly of midwife goddesses called the "female lords", the most powerful of whom is described as being particularly fearsome.

== Epigraphy, Textile Semiotics, and Obstetric Hydrotherapy ==
In Maya epigraphy and codical iconography, the aged manifestation of Ixchel (Goddess O / Chak Chel) is structurally linked to the invention of backstrap weaving (telar de cintura) and specialized medicinal hydrotherapy. The deity's attributes integrate linguistic, textile, and botanical motifs that defined Classic and Postclassic reproductive medicine:

- Epigraphic Glyphs: In the Dresden Codex, her name sign combines the prefix Chak (T109, meaning "red" or "great") with the pictographic head of an aged woman featuring jaguar ears, often associated with the logosyllabic weaver's spindle glyph.
- Textile Semiotics: The weaving implements (spindles, shuttle sticks, and warp-tension straps) depicted in her headdress on the Classic "Birth Vase" (Kerr 5113) symbolize the cosmic weaving of human life, where warp and weft threads represent ancestral lineage continuity.
- Steambath Ethnobotany: As the divine patron of the sweatbath (K'iche': chuj), her healing rituals incorporated specific aromatic and thermogenic plants—such as pepper-wood (Zanthoxylum), Tagetes (pericón), and Piperaceae species—to regulate postpartum body temperature and facilitate lactation.

== Meaning of the name ==
The name Ixchel was in use in 16th-century Yucatán and amongst the Poqom in the Baja Verapaz. Its meaning is not certain. Assuming that the name originated in Yucatán, chel could mean "rainbow". Her glyphic names in the (Post-Classic) codices have two basic forms, one a prefix with the primary meaning of "red" (chak) followed by a portrait glyph ("pictogram"), the other one logosyllabic. Ix Chel's Classic name glyph remains to be identified. It is quite possible that several names were in use to refer to the goddess, and these need not necessarily have included her late Yucatec and Poqom name. Her codical name is now generally rendered as "Chak Chel".

== Confusion with the moon goddess ==
In the past, it was common to take Ix Chel as the Yucatec name of the moon goddess because of a shared association with human fertility and procreation. The identification is questionable, however, since (1) colonial and ethnographical sources provide no direct evidence to show that Ixchel was a moon goddess and (2) the Classic Maya moon goddess, identifiable through her crescent, is invariably represented as a fertile young woman. Moreover, fertility and procreation are as important to an aged midwife as to a young mother, albeit in different ways.

== Ixchel as an earth and a war goddess ==
An entwined serpent serves as Ixchel's headdress, crossed bones may adorn her skirt, and instead of human hands and feet, she sometimes has claws. Very similar features are found with Aztec earth goddesses, of whom Tlaltecuhtli, Toci, and Cihuacoatl were invoked by the midwives. Being a jaguar goddess, the Classic Ixchel (or 'Chak Chel') could equally be imagined as a fearsome female warrior equipped with shield and spear, not unlike Cihuacoatl in the latter's capacity of Yaocihuatl ('Warrior Woman').

== Ixchel as a rain goddess ==
The Madrid Codex (30b) assimilates Goddess O to a rain deity, with rain pouring from her arm-pits and abdomen, while the Dresden Codex includes her in almanacs dedicated to the rain deities (Chaacs) and typically has her invert a water jar. On page 74 of the same codex, her emptying of the water jar replicates the vomiting of water by a celestial dragon. Although this scene has usually been understood as the Flood bringing about the end of the world, it is now thought to symbolize periodic rain storms and floodings as predicted on the basis of the preceding 'rain tables'.

== Mythology ==
Name glyph of Ix Chel including the prefix 'red', Dresden Codex

Ixchel figures in a Verapaz myth related by Las Casas, according to which she, together with her spouse, Itzamna, had thirteen sons, two of whom created heaven and earth and all that belongs to it. No other myth figuring Ixchel has been preserved. However, her mythology may once have focused on the sweatbath, the place where Maya mothers were to go before and after birthgiving. As stated above, the Aztec counterpart to Ixchel as a patron of midwifery, Toci, was also the Goddess of the sweatbath. In myths from Oaxaca, the aged adoptive mother of the Sun and Moon siblings is finally imprisoned in a sweatbath to become its patron deity. Several Maya myths have aged goddesses end up in the same place, in particular the Cakchiquel and Tzʼutujil grandmother of Sun and Moon, called Bʼatzbʼal ("Weaving Implement") in Tzʼutujil. On the other hand, in Qʼeqchiʼ Sun and Moon myth, an aged Maya goddess (Xkitza) who would otherwise appear to correspond closely to the Oaxacan Old Adoptive Mother, does not appear to be connected to the sweatbath.

== Cult of Ixchel ==
In the early 16th century, Maya women seeking to ensure a fruitful marriage would travel to the sanctuary of Ix Chel on the island of Cozumel, the most important place of pilgrimage after Chichen Itza, off the east coast of the Yucatán peninsula. There, a priest hidden in a large statue would give oracles. To the north of Cozumel is a much smaller island baptized by its Spanish colonizer and pillager, Hernández de Córdoba, the "Island of Women" (Isla Mujeres), "on account of the idols representing the Goddesses of the country which he found there, such as Ixchel, Ix Chekel Yax, Ixhunie, Ixhunieta. They were clothed from the waist down and had their breasts covered, as is the custom of Indian women." On the other side of the peninsula, the head town of the Chontal province of Acalan (Itzamkanac) venerated Ixchel as one its main deities. One of Acalan's coastal settlements was called Tixchel "At the place of Ixchel". The Spanish conqueror, Hernán Cortés, tells us about another place in Acalan where unmarried young women were sacrificed to a goddess in whom "they had much faith and hope", possibly again Ixchel.

== In popular culture ==
- Ixchel features in Yu-Gi-Oh! as a member of the Darklord Archetype in Darklord Ixchel.
- Ixchel features in Marvel Comics as a member of the Ahau.
- Ixchel is playable in Smite as a mage. She is the second Maya goddess to feature in Smite, after Awilix.
- In the 2006 movie Apocalypto, Ixchel is muttered by a Maya mother in a scene where she is forced to cross a river and her children are left behind.
- Ixchel features prominently In the 2018 action-adventure game Shadow of the Tomb Raider.
- Ixchel plays a leading role in Gemma Files' book trilogy, The Hexslinger series.

== See also ==
- List of health deities
- Maya jaguar gods
- Midwifery in Maya society

== Bibliography ==
- Ardren, Traci (2006) Mending the Past: Ix Chel and Invention of a Modern Pop Goddess. Antiquity 80:25-37.
- Coe, Michael (1977). "Supernatural Patrons of Maya Scribes and Artists." In N. Hammond. Social Process in Maya Prehistory. Princeton, New Jersey: Princeton University Press. pp. 327–347.
- Garibay, Angel Maria, Veinte himnos sacros de los nahuas. Informantes de Sahagún, 2. Mexico: UNAM 1958.
- Groark, Kevin P., To Warm the Blood, To Warm the Flesh: The Role of the Steambath in Highland Maya (Tzotzil-Tzeltal) Ethnomedicine. Journal of Latin American Lore 20-1 (1997): 3-96.
- Grube, Nikolai, Der Dresdner Maya-Kalender. Der vollständige Codex. Herder 2012.
- Miles, S.W., The Sixteenth-Century Pokom-Maya. Philadelphia: The American Philosophical Society 1957.
- Miller, Mary, and Simon Martin, Courtly Art of the Ancient Maya. Fine Arts Museum of San Francisco. Thames and Hudson 2004.
- Miller, Mary, and Karl Taube, An Illustrated Dictionary of The Gods and Symbols of Ancient Mexico and the Maya. Thames and Hudson 1993.
- Roys, Ralph L., Ritual of the Bacabs. Norman: University of Oklahoma Press 1965.
- Scholes, France V., and Ralph L. Roys, The Maya Chontal Indians of Acalan-Tixchel. Norman: University of Oklahoma Press 1968.
- Tarn, Nathaniel, and Martin Prechtel, Constant Inconstancy. The Feminine Principle in Atiteco Mythology. In Gary Gossen ed., Symbol and Meaning beyond the Closed Community. Essays in Mesoamerican Ideas. New York: State University of New York at Albany 1986.
- Taube, Karl, The Major Gods of Ancient Yucatán. Washington: Dumbarton Oaks 1992.
- Taube, Karl, The Birth Vase: Natal Imagery in Ancient Maya Myth and Ritual. In Justin Kerr, ed., The Maya Vase Book: A Corpus of Rollout Photographs of Maya Vases, Volume 4. New York: Kerr Associates 1994.
- J.E.S. Thompson, Maya History and Religion. Norman: University of Oklahoma Press 1970.
- Tozzer, Alfred, Landa's Relación de las Cosas de Yucatán, a Translation. 1941.
