= Temazcalteci =

Aztec Goddess of steam baths and medicine

In the Aztec mythology, Temazcalteci (pronounced [temaskalˈtesi], Nahuatl temāzcalli 'sweat bath' + tecitl 'grandmother') was the goddess of steam baths. According to Sahagún, she was the goddess of medicine, Toci, venerated by doctors. She was also worshipped by those who had temazcals (baths) in their houses.

== Sources and external links ==
- Fr. Bernardino de Sahagún - Historia General de las Cosas de la Nueva España. México: Editorial Porrúa, S. A., 1979.
- Find A Goddess site
- GodChecker
- Oaxaca tourist bureau
