= Health in Guatemala =

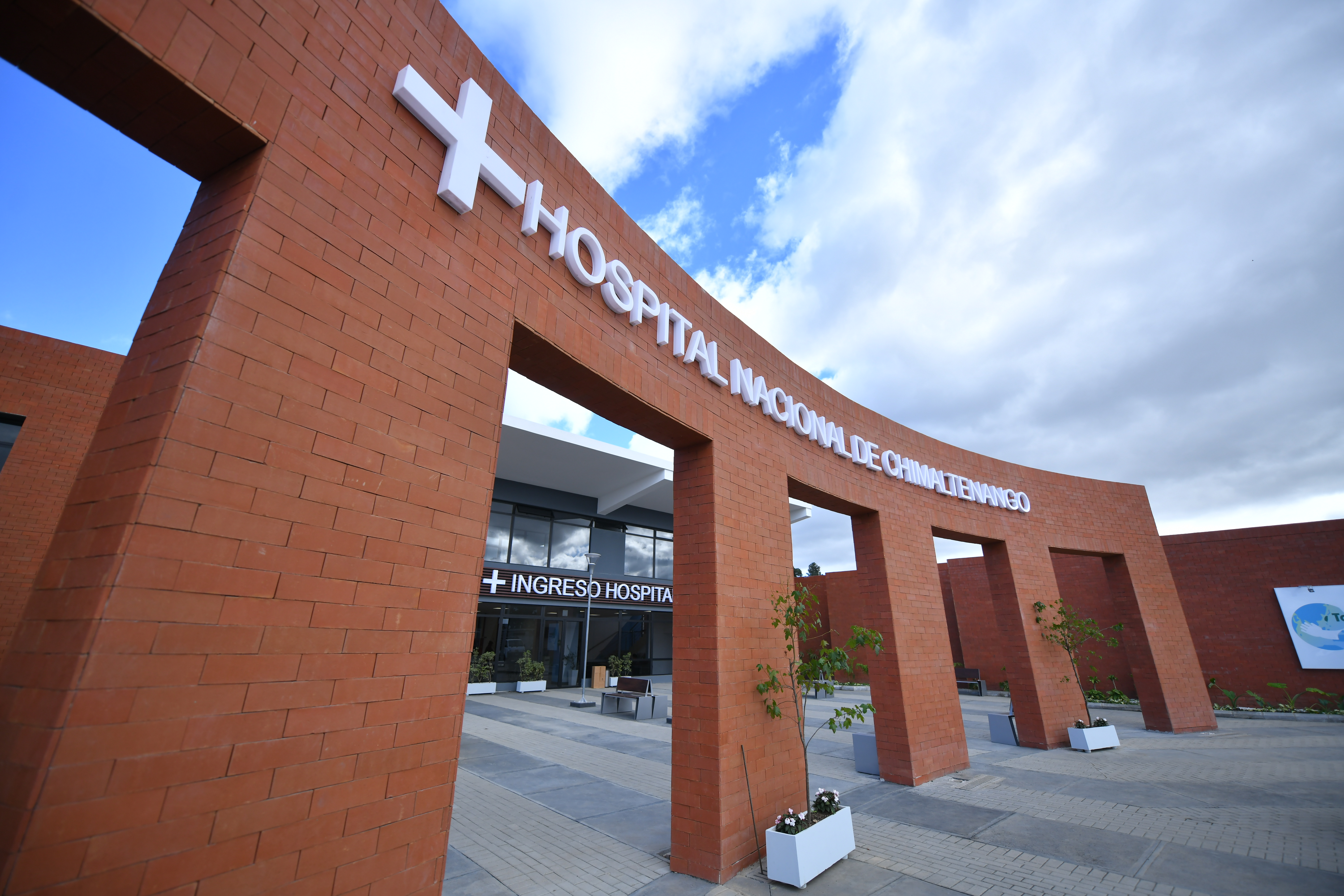
The Regional Chimaltenango Hospital, located in Chimaltenango

Health indicators
Life expectancy	73.50 years
Infant mortality	25 deaths (per 1,000 live births)
Fertility rate	2.52 children
Sanitation	78.8% of population
Smoking	10.9%
Obesity in Adults	21.2%
Malnutrition (Total)	50%
Malnutrition (Rural)	70%
HIV/AIDS	0.54%

Health in Guatemala is focused on many different systems of prevention and care. Guatemala's Constitution states that every citizen has the universal right to health care. However, this right has been hard to guarantee due to limited government resources and other problems regarding access. The health care system in place today developed out of the Civil War in Guatemala. The Civil War prevented social reforms from occurring, especially in the sector of health care.

The Human Rights Measurement Initiative finds that Guatemala is fulfilling 81.6% of what it should be fulfilling for the right to health based on its level of income. When looking at the right to health with respect to children, Guatemala achieves 94.8% of what is expected based on its current income. In regards to the right to health amongst the adult population, the country achieves only 87.3% of what is expected based on the nation's level of income. Guatemala falls into the "very bad" category when evaluating the right to reproductive health because the nation is fulfilling only 62.9% of what the nation is expected to achieve based on the resources (income) it has available.

== Health care system ==
Today, there have been many reforms to the health care system, but the current system continues to have significant problems. The country is on its way to develop a solid health care system, and is working toward achieving many of the Millennium Development Goals in place. However, the inequalities that are associated with outcomes and access have not been addressed, making it difficult for Guatemala to move forward in the field of health care. The ratio of doctors to residents is low, at .9 doctors per 1,000 citizens. The system requires a lot of change in order to serve the whole Guatemalan community.

=== History ===
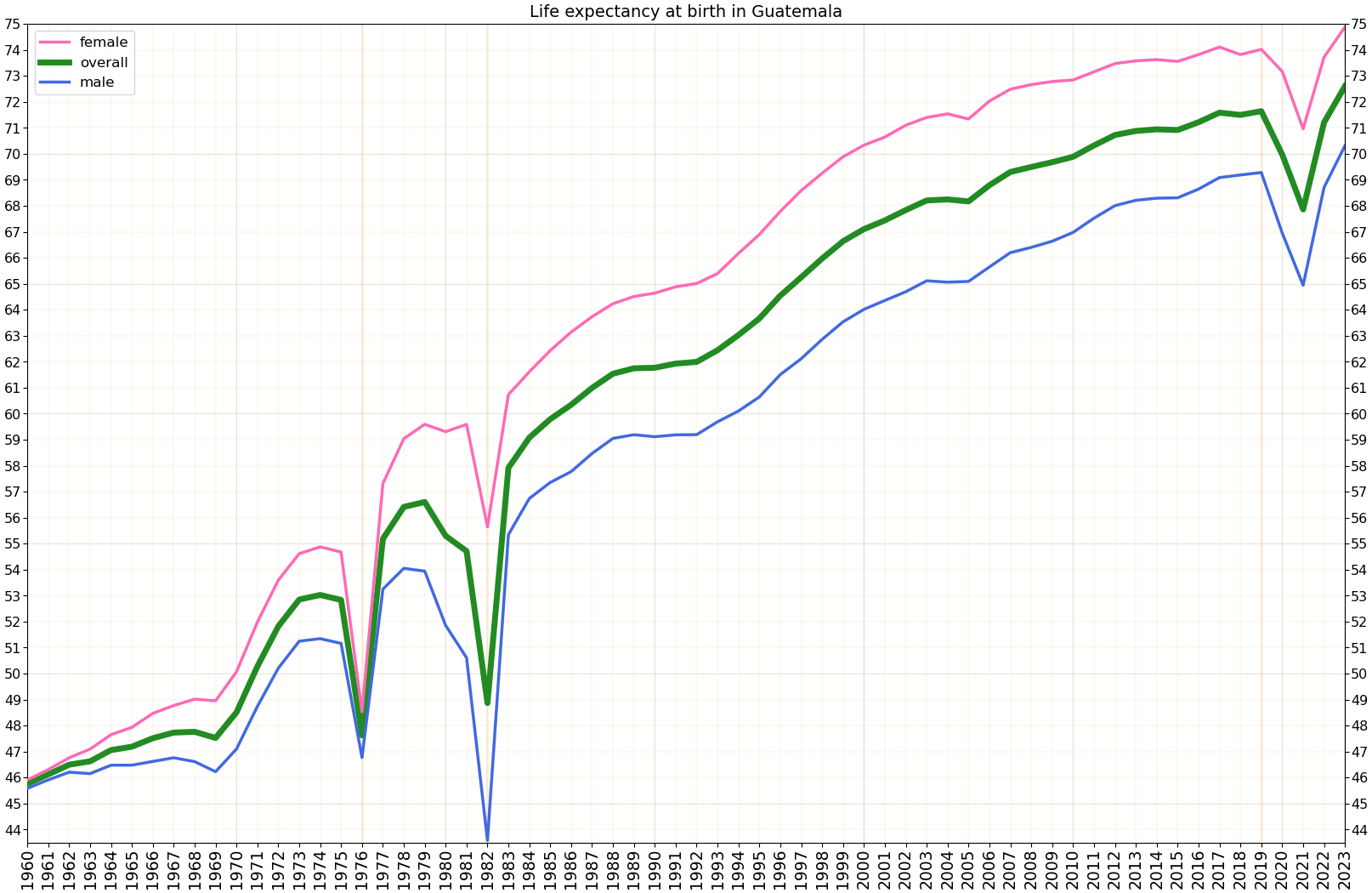
Life expectancy in Guatemala

When the Civil War broke out in Guatemala, social improvements in health care were brought to a halt. The period of the 34-year Civil War (from 1954-mid 1980s) resulted in many changes within the health sector. The focus on health care was generally abandoned throughout the period of war when the country experienced a period of "privatization through attrition," which generated poor service and low health care coverage for decades to follow. As Verduga mentions, the total GDP expenditures on health was only about 1 to 2 percent during this period of war. Therefore, it was the emergence of NGOs and other community organizations that allowed for basic health care to be provided to the general population.

Once the Guatemalan Civil War ended in 1996 with the signing of the Peace Accords, health care was placed in the hands of a new democratic government. Immediately after the war, Guatemala saw little change in the healthcare sector. However, starting in 1999, the health care system was improved with increased government spending and aid. Although this was a drastic improvement from the times of war, the system was still insufficient and did not come close to meeting all of the needs of the Guatemalan people.

=== Structure and coverage ===
Today, the Guatemalan health care system is split into three separate divisions: the public, private nonprofit, and private for-profit sectors. Within the public sector, there is the Ministry of Health and Social Security (MOH), the Guatemalan Social Security Institute (IGSS), and the Military Health Service. This sector of the health care system formally covers about 88% of the population. The private sector, which accounts for about 12% of the population, includes many for-profit providers, non-profit entities, and traditional local providers. The public sector works to provide care through hospitals, health facilities, and various health centers, whereas the private sector allocates resources within private offices, clinics, and hospitals.

Very few funds are allocated to health care within Guatemala. As a share of GDP, health care spending in Guatemala is one of the lowest in Central America (2.6 percent). The GDP expenditure shows that few funds are allocated to the health care system in Guatemala. In total, the Guatemalan government's expenditures on health were about $196 US dollars in 2010. This amount was significantly less than the total Central American average ($350) and the average Latin American and the Caribbean (LAC) expenditures ($672). The health care system requires more funds to improve the coverage and overall health care system in Guatemala.

The Peace Accords, which were signed in 1996, called for a change in health provision goals. In 1997, the MOH established a program called the Expansion of Coverage Program (PEC), which worked to improve the availability of health and nutrition services to young children and women in rural areas of Guatemala. As Pena explains, current MOH services do not cover the poor, rural population of Guatemala, making the PEC critical to the rural population. Ever since its creation, the PEC has expanded immensely, now covering about 54% of the health and nutrition needs of rural Guatemalans. The coverage program works with NGOs in the area to promote good health and nutrition to populations who lack sufficient health care. However, important accountability systems regarding transparency and progress were not installed, limiting the program's effectiveness. The services covered by the PEC include care for women and infants, illnesses and emergency care, and environmental care.

There is also an informal sector of healthcare that is often overlooked. Termed the "Maya Mobile Clinic" or the "Other Public Health", traveling salespeople (often men) are a medical resource for Guatemalans living in the highlands. These salespeople offer raw and natural ingredients to mainly indigenous populations and give talks about their health qualities. Maya Mobile Clinics act as a midpoint between the physical distance of the Guatemalan highlands and public clinic locations, and as a midpoint between the cultural gap that separates Maya medicinal norms and values from Guatemala's public health sector's medicinal norms and values.

== Conditions ==
There are many communicable diseases and conditions that threaten the livelihood of the Guatemalan people on a day-to-day basis. Infectious diseases are still the number one cause of death for people in developing countries, whereas in the developed world, infectious diseases are no longer a significant problem. Furthermore, in Guatemala, parasites, diabetes, and malnutrition are huge health problems. Diabetes threatens development in many rural Mayan communities within Guatemala. In order to attack this problem head-on, "health service efforts must be culturally appropriate and emphasize awareness, prevention, early detection, and universal treatment". Also, malnutrition remains a huge problem among children and adults in Guatemala. Given the prevalence of poverty, many residents have limited access to quality nutrition, limited education, and higher rates of disease. Even though there have been improvements, Guatemala is still characterized by high infant and maternal morbidity and mortality rates, pervasive malnutrition, and high incidences of infectious diseases. Also, in Guatemala, the prevalence of Type 2 diabetes and obesity has risen.

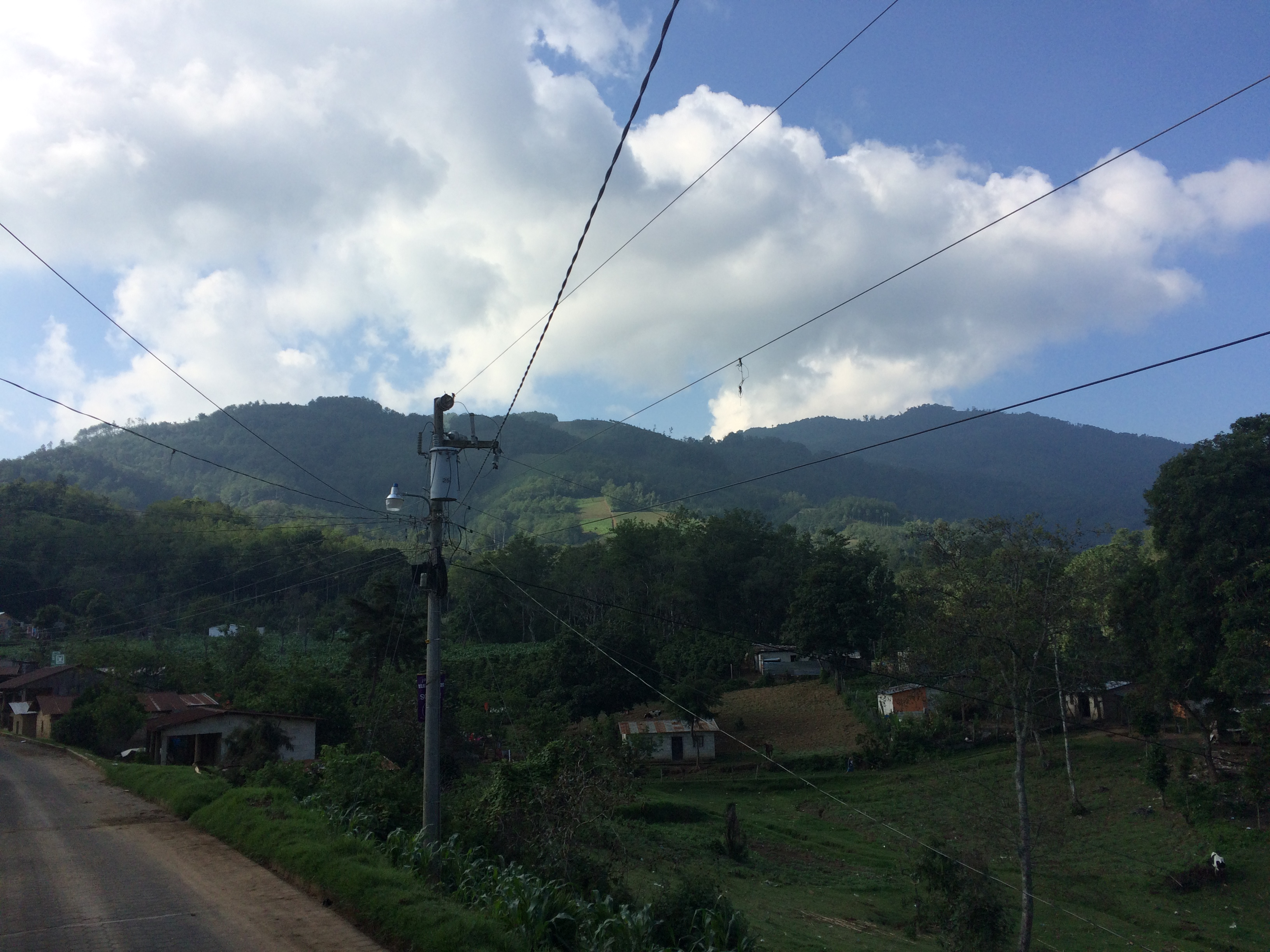
An image of a rural village in the highlands of Guatemala

=== Communicable diseases ===
In Guatemala, communicable diseases for which treatment exists are still one of the major causes of death. Wealthy, more industrialized developed nations have been able to eliminate communicable diseases due to an epidemiological transition, in which death rates due to degenerative diseases have surpassed those of communicable and infectious diseases. The opposite is apparent in Guatemala. The high mortality rate for infants is a direct result of communicable and infectious diseases. Similarly, the epidemiological profile of Guatemala shows that some of the most prevalent infectious diseases, like diarrhea and acute respiratory infections, are a direct result of poverty. In Guatemala, 56 percent of the population lives below the poverty line. Poverty levels are greatest in the indigenous communities of Guatemala, which account for about 81 percent of those living in poverty, and make up about 43 percent of Guatemala's total population. High levels of poverty make the population more vulnerable to communicable diseases, which is why government funding of health care is necessary for the rural areas of Guatemala.

Even though Guatemala has improved its health care system substantially since the end of the Guatemalan Civil War, mortality rates for communicable diseases still show that considerable progress needs to be made to remove the burden of infectious diseases on the population. In a country like Guatemala, water is poor and frequently contaminated. In order to decrease common communicable diseases like diarrhea, tuberculosis, pneumonia, and respiratory disease, clean water and sanitation are necessary. With the health care system's provision of both clean water and food, the incidence of infectious and communicable diseases will decrease.

=== Parasites ===
Parasites present one of the biggest threats to health in Guatemala. Many of the common parasites in developing countries like Guatemala are spread through contamination of both water and food. Some of the effects of parasites include intestinal obstructions, which can hinder the body from absorbing nutrients, lead to a loss of appetite, impair long term growth, induce vomiting, cause anemia and anorexia, and in severe cases, cause death. Symptoms can also include intense abdominal pain, loss of appetite, nausea, diarrhea, and fever.

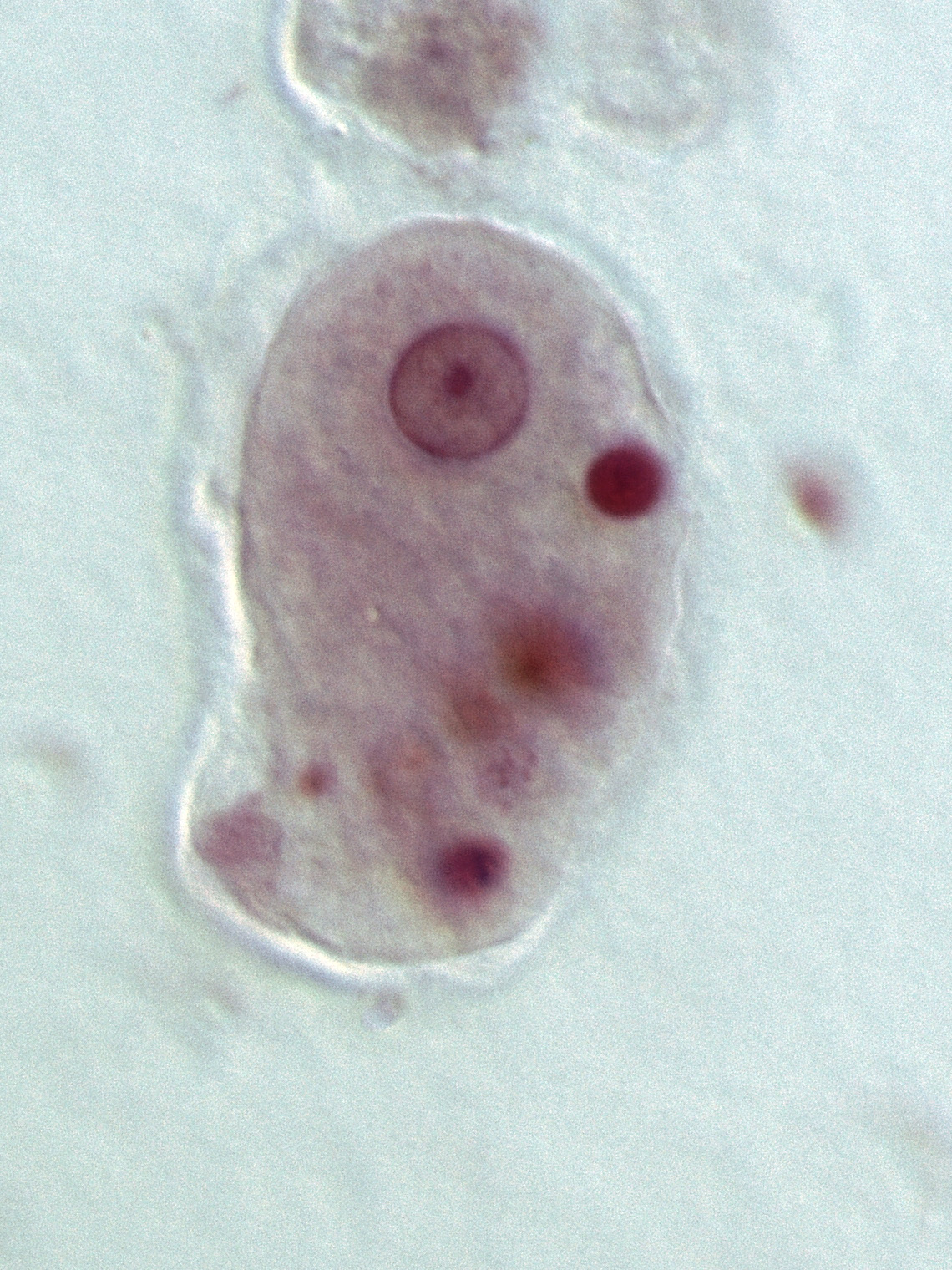
Entamoeba histolytica, a parasite that is very common among children in Guatemala

It has been seen that the prevalence of parasites is significantly higher among younger children and those who are malnourished. Parasites are usually transferred through contaminated water, making them dangerous because they are able to induce malnutrition by consuming the body's nutrients, thus impeding a child's physical development. For school children who are infected with parasites, cognitive functioning can drastically decrease, directly impacting their education. School children who have been treated for parasites immediately perform significantly better in school settings. Parasite infections can also vary based on access to clean water and whether or not sewage disposal is present. The Millennium Development Goals discussed the importance of deworming to help meet the goals set by the United Nations. Parasites can have serious long-term consequences in that they directly affect development and health for decades after. However, inexpensive, single-dose medications exist that can fully treat these parasitic infections.

=== Diabetes ===
Diabetes is a significant problem within the Guatemalan population. As a rising public health concern, diabetes largely threatens the indigenous population of Guatemala. Because this population frequently has limited access to the Guatemalan health care system, knowledge about the emergence of diabetes is also incredibly limited. Indigenous areas are particularly under-resourced with respect to doctors and overall health care programs.

A risk factor for diabetes within the indigenous population is dietary change over time. Changes in indigenous diets were a result of structural and economic changes, which forced the rural population to resort to energy-dense foods that are extremely high in saturated fats and simple carbohydrates. These simple carbohydrates can be found throughout Guatemalan cuisine, especially corn, which is one of the staple foods of the Guatemalan diet. This in turn leads to the higher prevalence of Type 2 diabetes, because the entire population has added more fats and sugars into their diets.

A large issue for the indigenous population and the greater Guatemalan population in general is access to medication. Medication used to treat diabetes is very expensive and would require the Guatemalan government to devote significant resources to provide medication for every diabetic. However, diabetes is a manageable disease, and can also be treated with frequent physical activity and a change in diet, focused on management and healthy choices.

=== Pesticide poisoning ===
Due to farming conditions and yield pressures in Guatemala, many agricultural workers are at high risk of pesticide poisoning. People often handle pesticides without protective clothing or gear, soaking it in through their skin and inhaling it into their lungs. A large black market and lack of oversight over legal pesticide use in Guatemala also contributes to its rampant and unsafe use. Pesticide poisoning most likely disproportionately affects indigenous farm workers.

== Mayan health ==
One aspect of the Guatemalan health care system is its focus on Mayan health. Because the Mayan population is so prevalent in Guatemala, it is necessary to consider their barriers to quality health care. Taking into account the language barriers, diet, and living conditions, the Mayan population suffers enormously when it comes to proper health care. The life expectancy for Mayans can be up to 10 or 15 years lower than other Guatemalans. Since the Civil War, the Mayan population generally resides in poverty stricken areas, and therefore has limited access to the healthcare that is available to the Ladinos, or non-indigenous population.

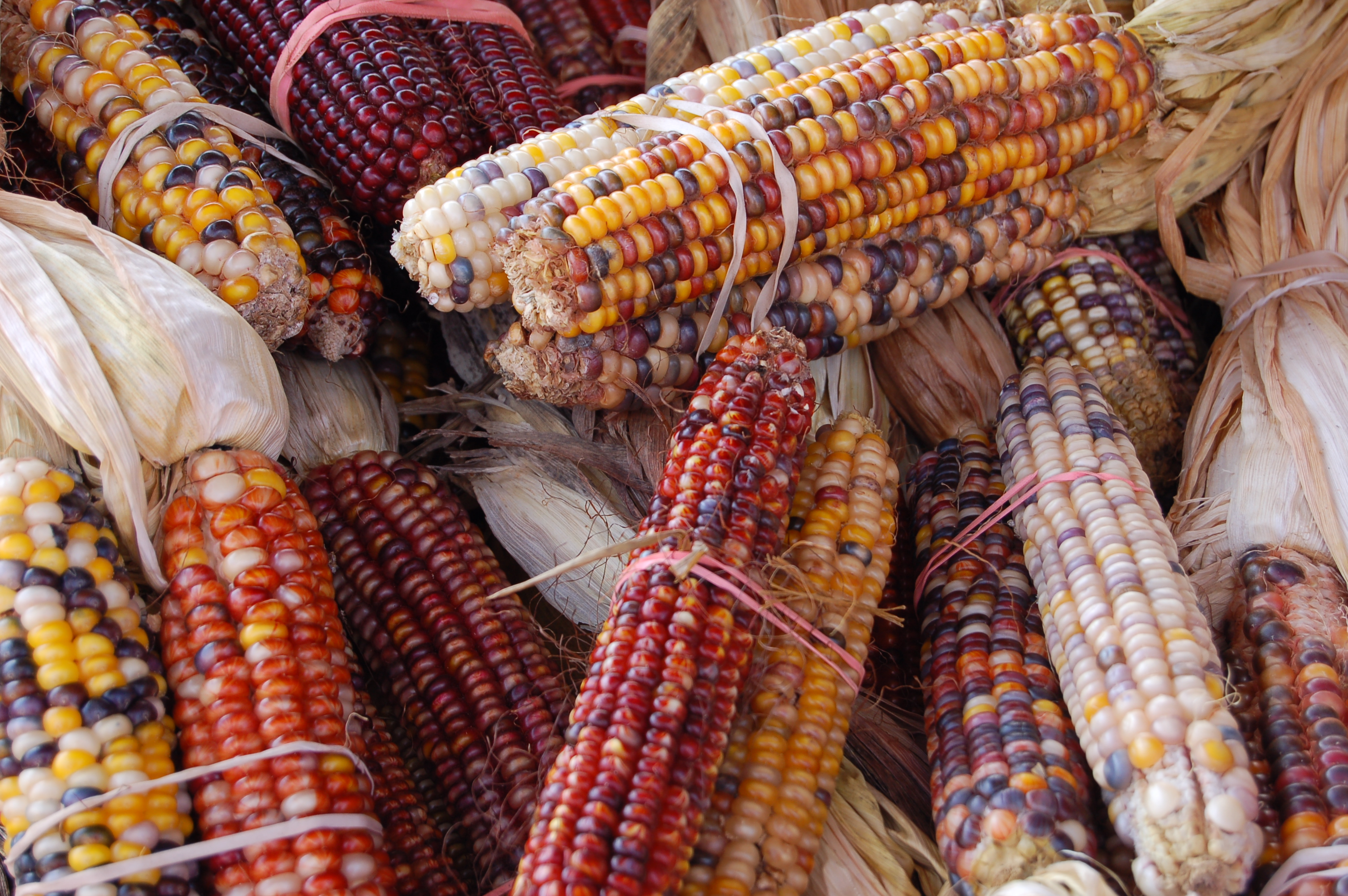
Variations of maize that are a staple food in the Mayan diet

=== Medical pluralism ===
Indigenous Guatemalan communities deal with "medical pluralism", or the intersection of beliefs and uses regarding traditional and biomedical healthcare. Traditional Maya medical care involves plant medicine and ethnomedical practitioners who learn in one-on-one or self-taught settings. Western medical systems and the Guatemalan public health system have been criticized for not considering ethnomedical practices to be legitimate, and interest among indigenous Guatemalans in taking on ethnomedical apprenticeships has been declining, resulting in tension between practices.

=== Language ===
In Guatemala, about 45% of the Ladino population lives in poverty, while about 91% of the indigenous population succumbs to extreme poverty levels. This large difference appears in other aspects of life as well, like family planning, susceptibility to disease, education level, and access to health care. Such inequalities can largely be attributed to a large language barrier between the indigenous population and the non-indigenous peoples. Generally, the indigenous people of Guatemala speak only a variety of local Mayan languages. In relation to health care, these language barriers can be significant. Most of the medical professionals that serve the indigenous communities are Ladino, and speak Spanish only. Communicating health related issues to a patient under these conditions becomes an obstacle, which in turn causes indigenous people to avoid health care centers altogether. The indigenous population is unable to communicate with the doctors directly, which is both difficult and embarrassing. Ishida et al. discovered that the combination of poverty and language barriers made indigenous women less likely to seek services from health care providers.

=== Diet ===
The Mayan diet is different from the diet of non-indigenous Guatemalans. Throughout their history, the Maya have used maize as a principal crop. Staple foods of the Mayan diet today are corn and beans. The better cash crops like greens, tomatoes, fruits, eggs, and poultry are mainly sold to Ladinos and are not purchased by Mayans. Therefore, Mayan nutrition is very poor because it includes little besides starches and protein. Corn has a significant amount of carbohydrates, which in turn increases blood sugar levels. This increase in blood sugar makes diabetes a very common disease within the Mayan population. Also, with this lack of crucial nutrients, malnutrition is very prominent in the indigenous population. The widespread consumption of corn contaminated with aflatoxins leads to serious health problems.

=== Living conditions ===
The Mayan people frequently live in rural villages of Guatemala, which are generally known to be impoverished areas. About 80% of indigenous Guatemalans live below the "international poverty line." Very few Mayan families have the economic stability to devote money towards health care. With the high prices of medications and the poor quality of health posts, impoverished patients refuse to use or trust the westernized health care system. For centuries, the relationship between the Ladinos and the Mayans has been antagonistic. Throughout the period of the Guatemalan Civil War, Mayans were excluded from land and water resources as well as educational, health care, political, and economic resources. Even in today's modern age, the effects of exclusion and deprivation from the war are still felt my many indigenous Mayans. This directly affects health care because the Mayan population does trust Western medicine and hospitals. Similarly, the Ladino doctors that work in the health field make the indigenous people feel powerless and guarded instead of supported.

Many indigenous Guatemalans survive on below-subsistence agriculture. Farms are not large enough to sustain large-scale subsistence farming, making the overall yield exceptionally low. Because of the limited amount of farmland, its unequal distribution, and the growing population, poverty continues to ravish the Mayan civilizations. The concrete living distance also plays a role in health care accessibility for indigenous population. More than likely, these rural villages where the Mayans reside are located close to an hour walk away from any health clinic or post. The inaccessibility of the clinics leads to fewer visits and more health complications in the indigenous population.

Government run hospitals are located in the main cities of several provinces. Indigenous peoples' highland locality - often distant from main cities - makes travel to these hospitals expensive, further limiting access. Taking advantage of the importance of midwifery in many indigenous traditional medicinal systems, the Ministry of Public Health decided to better reach indigenous populations through midwife training programs in the 1980s. However, the quality, efficacy, and cultural sensitivity of these programs has been brought into question.

== Children and women's health ==
For women and children, the health discrepancies are very visible. In children, infant mortality and malnutrition are rampant. Severe health and nutritional deficiencies are associated with deaths of children under the age of 5. Similarly, physical and mental development can be severely impacted by malnutrition in children. On the other hand, women's health focuses on preventable deaths related to pregnancy, delivery, and post-pregnancy complications. Most of the time, services that are provided for contraceptive health do not reach the at-risk population. At-risk women and infants frequently die because of their limited access to quality health care, as well as their perilous living conditions. Many programs have been implemented to try and incorporate all levels of reproductive health in order to improve care for these populations.

=== Infants ===
In Guatemala, infant mortality continues to be a big problem. As of 2023, it is estimated that Guatemala's infant mortality rate is 25.57 for every 1,000 live births. As mentioned, rural areas of Guatemala exhibit the highest levels of morbidity and infant mortality because health care in those areas is largely inaccessible. Generally, infant mortality rates are used as an indicator of general health levels in a particular country.

Infants are more susceptible to infectious diseases and conditions like malaria, which can cause severe morbidity, and even death. For infants, physical growth is critical to proper and successful development. Therefore, if there are insufficient nutrients being provided to the infant during this period of growth and cell proliferation, the number of neurons will be permanently reduced. In Guatemala, this issue is particularly prominent. Nutrition and proper health care is crucial in early infant development in order to insure that these infants will thrive and grow into strong children. Therefore, the nutritional deficiencies, infectious diseases, and parasitic diseases directly lead to higher mortality rates for children under the age of 5 in Guatemala. These higher mortality rates are prominent in both rural and urban areas of Guatemala when diseases are present. However, these rates are significantly higher in rural areas where limited access to health care, high levels of illiteracy, poor sanitation, and nutritional deficiencies are factored into the rate.

=== Malnutrition in children ===
Malnutrition is a serious condition that threatens the health and well-being of many people in developing nations. In Guatemala, nutritional deficiencies have been shown to severely impact the growth and development of children both physically and mentally. Stunting and underweight are both common physical indicators for acute and chronic malnutrition in children. According to Gragnolati and Marini, in 2003, over 44 percent of the Guatemalan child population is chronically malnourished. However, these numbers are even higher for indigenous populations of Guatemala (58 percent) in comparison to the non-indigenous population. Although the incidence rate of stunting has decreased in Guatemala, the rate of decline is minuscule compared to other countries in the LAC region.

The high incidence of malnutrition within indigenous populations is a direct result of poor water sanitation and limited access to clean water. According to the MOH, about 98% of the water sources in Guatemala are contaminated. Disease and malnutrition are highly correlated with one another; both are causes and consequences of each other. In order to improve the health system and reduce the prevalence of malnutrition, easy availability of safe drinking water, together with disease treatment and prevention, are critical for the survival of Guatemalan children. Improvement must be implemented at the community level, by renovating infrastructures in order to provide piped water and sanitary operations for the residents.

One consequence of malnutrition and undernourishment is the degradation of cognitive performance, which can be studied and observed through schoolchildren and their performance in an educational setting. This can generally be observed in poorer settings. In poverty stricken areas of Guatemala, inadequate nutrient intake can lead to higher disease rates, which can in turn expedite the poverty cycle. Breastfeeding is also critical for infants to obtain sufficient nutrients and antibodies. Malnutrition severely weakens children who are already weaker to begin with, making them more vulnerable to life-threatening illnesses. Similarly, civil conflict (from the Guatemalan Civil War period) has left the indigenous population with many barriers to combat malnutrition, which has only prevented positive outcomes of health within the population through social, political, and economic exclusion.

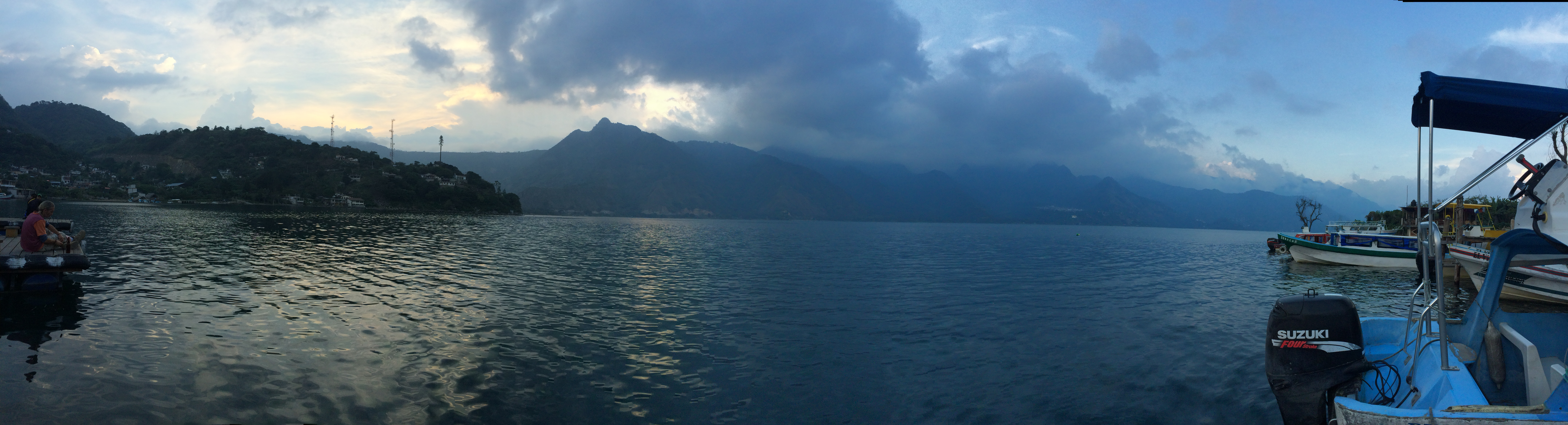
An image of Lake Atitlán, which is a major water source in Guatemala

=== Reproductive health ===
Reproductive health focuses on the health of infants as well as mothers. Guatemala is only beginning their transition into a more health-centered nation. The overall Guatemalan population is very young, which not only affects infant mortality rates, but significantly impacts both reproductive age and fertility rates. In Guatemala, the fertility rate is almost 5 children per mother, the highest in all of Latin America.

When the reproductive age is young, there can be many catastrophic effects. The maternal mortality rate for younger mothers is much higher. Guatemala is the country with the highest rate of maternal death related to pregnancy and delivery. This high rate is the result of many different factors, but mainly, it is a consequence of the scarcity of health care services, increased prevalence of illnesses, and the marginalization of women. Similarly, with a younger reproductive age, the chances of young mothers acquiring illnesses and transferring contaminants to their infants is very high.

Maternal health problems affect women throughout Guatemala, but are significantly more prevalent in poorer, more rural areas. Indigenous women frequently have unsafe living conditions, which makes them more susceptible to health related problems. This population has the highest fertility rates in Guatemala, as well as a significantly higher maternal mortality rate than the non-indigenous population. Very few births are attended by either doctors or nurses, making the indigenous population much more prone to complications related to pregnancy, delivery, or postpartum.

In Guatemala, knowledge and education about contraceptives and family planning is incredibly low, especially within the indigenous population. More education about the implications of reproduction can reduce population growth while simultaneously improving both maternal and infant health. Since the end of the Civil War, the indigenous population of Guatemala had turned to traditional practices for maternal deliveries because this group distrusted modern health care facilities and services provided by non-indigenous personnel. There is very little knowledge about health care services related to pregnancy and abortions. Abortions are illegal in Guatemala, and are only permitted if it will save the mother's life. The Guatemalan government is working to address maternal mortality by increasing public spending on health care to gain a greater understanding of "comprehensive reproductive health."

=== Family planning ===
Typically, in Guatemala, the general population is poor and has little access to quality health care services. The indigenous population and the Ladinos generally use traditional and formal health practices respectively. In both of these practices, family planning is very different. Differences in economic and social influences determine contraceptive use, child immunizations, prenatal care, and childbirth or delivery.

For the two populations within Guatemala, there are many large disparities between family planning actions. Family planning services are as scarce as health care services in the rural areas of Guatemala. Indigenous people in Guatemala are more likely to have little to no education and are often living in poverty. High poverty and illiteracy rates directly correlate with lower rates of contraceptive use. This lower rate is both a result of limited contraceptive knowledge and also the negative social stigma behind contraceptives. Guatemala's high fertility rate is a result of poor family planning initiatives, which result in young pregnancies, large families with many children, shorter birth intervals, and deficient growth within children. Similarly, breastfeeding plays a huge role in family planning, both as a nutrient and antibody source for infants, as well as a way to inhibit immediate fertility (because of the absence of menstruation) and allow for greater birth spacing.

Family decisions about health care depend on many factors. Specific family dynamics, individual beliefs and decisions of the mother, and direct community influences are all aspects to take into consideration when looking at family choices. The Guatemalan government has worked to implement family education centers within its poorer populations. A family life education class provides information pertaining to sex education, as well as reproductive health.

== Education ==
Education is an aspect of health that is generally ignored by the Guatemalan health care system. Proper education on nutrition and contraceptives has proven to impact both education levels and survival. In children, proper nutrition has been shown to accelerate development, both mentally and physically. Also, there is a large association between maternal education and a lower mortality rate of infants as well as healthier habits while pregnant. Education can also reinforce preventive measures. There is a relationship between poverty and education, but there are many possibilities within Guatemala that will allow education to prosper and serve a larger community. The lack of health education is one reason why many children and adults, through simple illnesses and pregnancies, end up dying prematurely. Health education provides mothers with resources to handle health issues and gives them access to knowledgeable sources outside their specific communities.

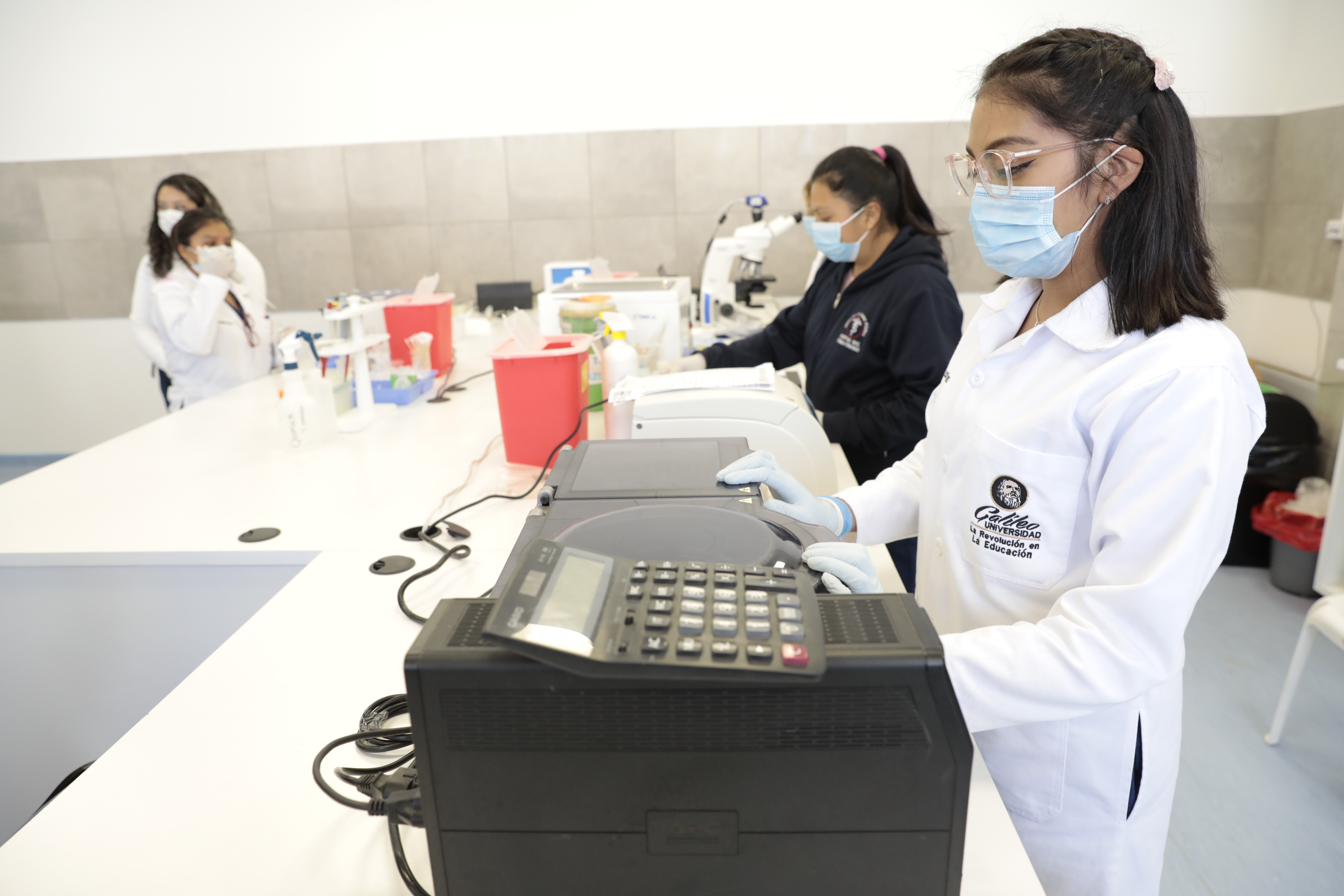
Medical students from Galileo University

=== Health education ===
Many Guatemalans do not have enough knowledge about health care to make concrete health decisions and know the results of outcomes. Education is required in order to provide both indigenous and non-indigenous Guatemalans with the understanding to make personal health choices. The education of school children and quality nutrition status have both shown to affect adult education levels. With the implementation of nutrition interventions as children, these adults were more likely to be more educated than others in the population. Similarly, Desai and Soumya discovered that there was a great relationship between child health and maternal education; therefore, the greater the mother's education, the healthier the child.

Within the Mayan population of Guatemala, education is not as accessible. However, it has also been observed that the indigenous population does not utilize health care services as readily. Delgado et al. discovered that the indigenous mothers actually did have a significant affinity for health seeking behaviors. Specifically, mothers determined which health services to frequent based on the illness of their child. However, many mothers explained that they would "normally not attend a medical service when their children presented the symptoms," for a variety of reasons including accessibility and dissatisfaction. Education and accessibility are required in order to expand health care into the more rural areas of Guatemala and implement health care planning techniques.

=== Preventive measures ===
Preventive measures, in the form of health care, work to improve the basic health services so that individuals can easily access them. Guatemala has shifted its focus onto preventive care, in order to serve the poorer communities that are more disadvantaged in health care. Especially in the field of Children and Women's Health, education on preventive measures can result in great health outcomes. In considering hygiene and sexually transmitted diseases, preventive education can alone hinder the onset of disease. Mothers are more likely to use health services, both as a preventive and medicinal tool, when they are educated.

In the field of education, knowledge about health outcomes is necessary, as well as poor health origins. The causes of illnesses are largely unknown or completely wrong. In considering the effects of hygiene on health, education is very limited. The indigenous population of Guatemala knows little about the transmission of disease or easy, hygienic techniques that can reduce severe health problems. Even with few years of education, women in the indigenous communities were more likely to understand and adopt different hygienic beliefs in order to prevent poor health outcomes. However, because of past experiences in which Ladino communities tried to assimilate into indigenous societies, the indigenous people of Guatemala resist the idea of adopting "western" or "Ladino" health behaviors. Therefore, the implementation of education into these communities would allow for increased preventive measures as well as overall health benefits.

Many of the deaths that occur frequently in Guatemala are a result of preventable and treatable diseases. Different preventive measures including sanitation, hygiene, vaccines, and education work to improve the health outcomes for many people in developing countries. There is a large discrepancy between those who are receiving preventive care and those who are not. In Guatemala, doctors only treat 24% of indigenous people, whereas they treat almost double that amount for non-indigenous Guatemalans. This statistic shows that more money can be spent working to provide preventive care services to the indigenous population of Guatemala. Preventable diseases can be eliminated with the implementation of these services and with the influence of education.

== See also ==
- Guatemala Health Initiative a private charitable aid organization operating in Santiago Atitlán
- Education in Guatemala
