= Guatemala Health Initiative =

Guatemalan NGO

The Guatemala Health Initiative (GHI) is a private, humanitarian organization that works to improve the health of the impoverished indigenous population in the remote areas of Guatemala's western highlands. The GHI is affiliated with the University of Pennsylvania. Faculty, students, and staff address health issues affecting the municipality of Santiago Atitlán. GHI aims to strengthen clinical services and promote community health in resource-poor Guatemalan communities.

== Background ==
Santiago Atitlán has 44,220 Tz'utujil, Mayan language-speaking inhabitants, and is 98 percent indigenous. The primary language for ninety-four percent of its residents is Tz'utujil; 54 percent also speak Spanish, and 13 percent read some Spanish. Residents of Santiago Atitlán are referred to as Atitecos. Eighty percent are Catholics, but traditional Mayan beliefs have also endured.

According to the World Bank, Guatemala had one of the most unequal income distributions in the world in 2011; 51 percent of the population lived on less than US$2 a day, and 15 percent lived on less than US$1 a day. Over half of Guatemala's population lives in extreme poverty, with the poverty level rising to 91 percent in the rural, indigenous Maya areas of Santiago Atitlán.

Guatemala's social-development indicators, such as maternal and infant mortality, chronic child malnutrition, and illiteracy, are among the worst in the Western Hemisphere. Santiago Atitlán has the country's worst access to health care. This and other indigenous communities in the Guatemalan highlands have very high rates of maternal and infant mortality, with many obstetrical complications and high levels of pre-eclampsia.

Despite criticism of water chlorination, 90 percent of residents get their drinking water from household or public taps; however, many still drink from contaminated sources or use home water-treatment methods. Public-health water interventions are needed to address factors underlying unequal access to clean water for waterborne diseases to be minimized. In Guatemala, 23 percent of households have a growth-stunted child and an overweight mother; poor diet is associated with this disparity.

Many global health programs – governmental, non-governmental (NGO), private, and voluntary organizations – work to support the people of Guatemala. The World Health Organization (WHO) directs international health activities, supplies training and technical assistance, develops standards, disseminates health information, promotes research, collects and analyzes epidemiologic data, and develops systems for monitoring and evaluating health programs in the country. One of the Global Health Initiatives sponsored by the United States government targets women, newborns and children under age five in Guatemala. It concentrates support efforts, aligning with NGOs and engaging the private sector to reduce maternal and infant mortality, increasing access to voluntary family planning services, prevention of HIV and other communicable diseases, and improving health systems and health services. In addition to large organizations, private voluntary organizations contribute twenty percent of the external health aid to distressed areas.

== History ==
The GHI established a partnership with the Hospitalito Atitlán in the summer of 2005, during a community-health assessment conducted by medical- and nursing-student volunteers from the University of Pennsylvania (Penn). The Hospitalito Atitlán succeeded Clínica Santiaguito, which had been operating since the 1960s. The Clínica was abandoned after the Guatemalan Army's massacre of thirteen Atitecos in 1990, and the town was left without medical services.

In 2002, the grassroots organization K'aslimaal began to raise funds and make plans to reconstruct the hospital. Hospitalito Atitlán opened on April 1, 2005, providing in-patient, surgical, and 24-hour emergency care to the people of Santiago Atitlán. On October 5, 2005, mudslides triggered by Hurricane Stan buried Hospitalito Atitlán under eight feet of mud. The mudslide destroyed the town and killed hundreds, and the area was declared a mass grave. Two Penn medical students were present during the disaster and participated in the relief efforts. Hospitalito Atitlán re-opened two weeks later in a temporary location. Groundbreaking for a new, permanent building began on September 30, 2006. In November 2010, the first floor of the new hospital opened.

Kent Bream, the GHI's founding faculty director, helped to rebuild the Hospitalito Atitlán. Bream trains students and coordinates interdisciplinary research, education, and service programming involving the Penn schools of Nursing, Medicine, Arts and Sciences, Engineering and Applied Science, and the Wharton School to help improve the health of the Atitlán community. The GHI partners with Hospitalito Atitlán.

Santiago Atitlán, Central America's largest indigenous village, is on the southern shore of Lake Atitlán. The word "atitlán" is a Mayan word meaning "the place where the rainbow gets its colors".

== 2011 update ==
Hospitalito Atitlán offers medical care to all, with a focus on women and children. Social workers, local physicians, nursing, and administrative staff work with volunteer medical personnel. For the many patients who speak only Tz'utujil, the hospital's staff translates Tz'tujil into Spanish.

The GHI's mission is to work with Hospitalito Atitlán to strengthen local medical services in a socially-relevant and ethically-acceptable way in the resource-poor Tz'ulujil Maya community of Santiago Atitlán. It collaborates with the hospital to improve the health of Atitecos by increasing clinical activities and community-health promotion with community-health research, personnel, and material support. The GHI provides education through videotapes, lectures, and community health projects, including maternal education emphasizing prenatal care, safe deliveries, and postnatal care. It advises the community on the hazards to pulmonary health associated with open cooking fires in homes and the importance of safe drinking water.

A number of projects between Penn and its Guatemalan partners are being conducted or explored, including scientific and clinical training with bilateral exchanges of students and faculty, and research on violence prevention, food and nutrition, road traffic safety, and chronic disease and trauma treatment.

In 2011, Bream, students, medical school librarians, and hospital IT specialists brought the Penn mobile-technology project to Hospitalito Atitlán. The project, a telemedicine program, uses smartphones and other mobile technologies to improve physicians' access to clinical information. The smartphone technology allows images and information to be relayed to Penn doctors for quick diagnosis and second opinions. Physicians can also use electronic devices to tap into extensive electronic medical databases and e-journals to get information on diseases and treatment options.
