= Toci =

Aztec goddess – heart of the Earth

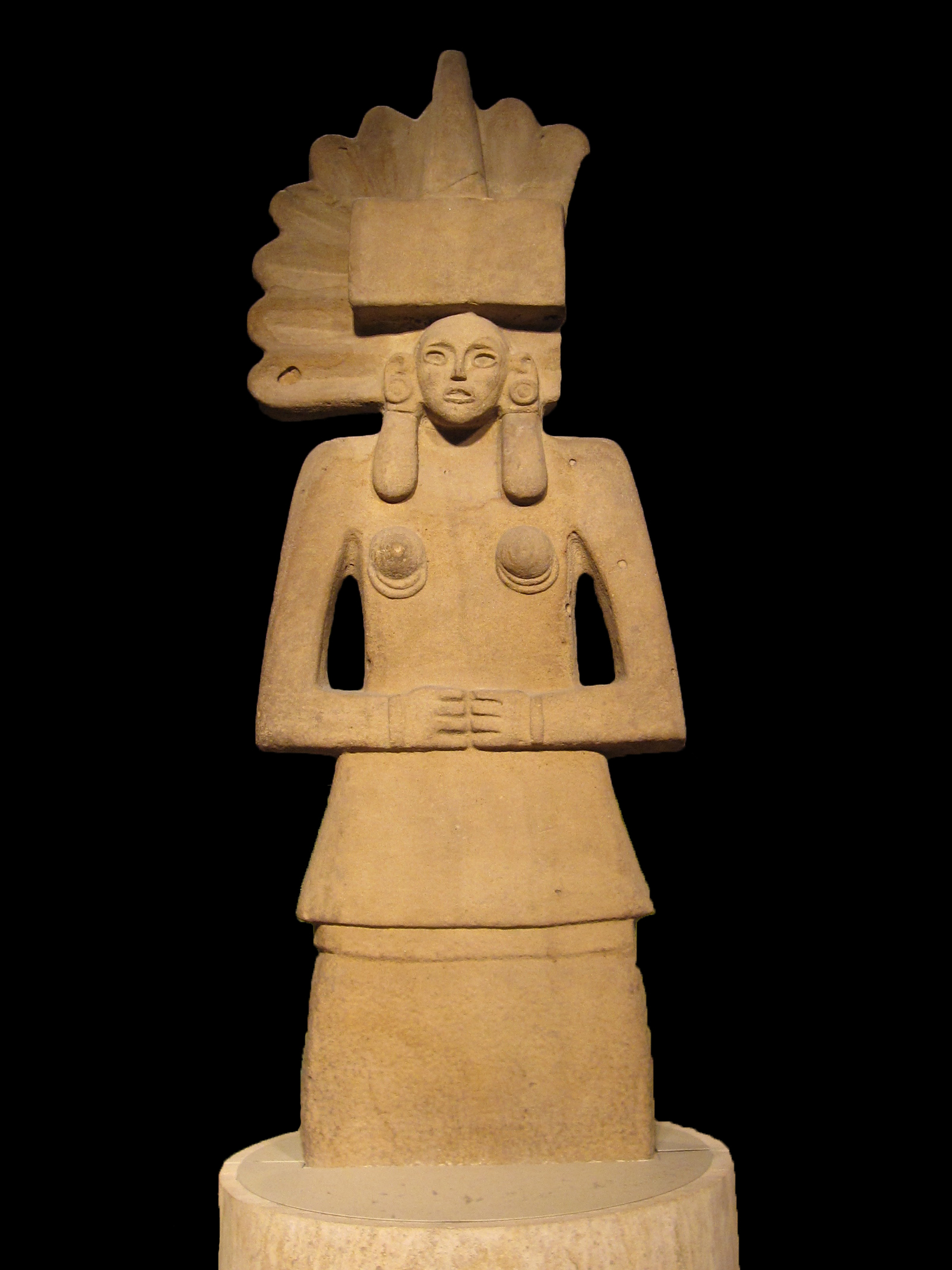
Statue of Toci (Tlazolteotl) from Mexico, 900–1521 CE (British Museum, id:Am1989,Q.3 )

Toci (Note: /ˈtoʊsi/; Classical Nahuatl: tocih, pronounced [ˈtó.siʔ], “our grandmother”, from to-, first person plural possessive, and cihtli, "grandmother" (the absolutive suffix -tli is dropped)) is a prominent deity in the religion and mythology of the pre-Columbian Aztec civilization of Mesoamerica.

In Aztec mythology, she is seen as an aspect of the mother goddess Coatlicue or Xochitlicue and is thus labeled "mother of the gods". (Note: Classical Nahuatl: tēteoh īnnān, lit. "gods, their mother")

She is also called Tlalli Iyollo, (Note: Classical Nahuatl: tlālli īyōlloh, pronounced [ˌtɬáː.lːi iːˈjóː.lːoʔ]) meaning "heart of the earth".

== Characteristics and associations ==
Although considered to be an aged deity, Toci is not always shown with specific markers of great age. Toci is frequently depicted with black markings around the mouth and nose, wearing a headdress with cotton spools (Miller and Taube 1993, p. 170). These are also characteristic motifs for Tlazolteotl, a central Mesoamerican goddess of both purification and filth (tlazolli in Nahuatl) and the two deities are closely identified with one another.

Toci was also associated with healing and venerated by curers of ailments and midwives. In the 16th century Florentine Codex compiled by Bernardino de Sahagún, Toci is identified with temazcalli or sweatbaths in which aspect she is sometimes termed Temazcalteci or "Grandmother of sweatbaths". Tlazolteotl also has an association with temazcalli as the "eater of filth" and such bathhouses are likely to have been dedicated to either Tlazolteotl or Toci/Temazcalteci. (Note: Sections of the Codex Magliabechiano indicate that the god Tezcatlipoca served as tutelary god for temazcalli, however its illustrations also clearly show the face of Tlazolteotl above the doorway.)

Toci also had an identification with war and had also the epithet "Woman of Discord".

== Traditions in mythology ==
By one Mexica-Aztec legendary tradition, at some point during their long peregrinations after leaving the mythical homeland Aztlan, the Mexica served as mercenaries to the Culhua at their capital of Culhuacan. The Culhua ruler bestowed his daughter upon the Mexica for an intended marriage with one of the Mexica nobility; however the Mexica's guiding and chief deity Huitzilopochtli intervened and ordered that she be flayed and sacrificed, instead. When this was done she transformed into Toci. The Mexica were expelled from Culhuacan by the Culhua ruler for the act, and the Mexica were pressed on towards Lake Texcoco. It was here that shortly thereafter they founded their capital Tenochtitlan, from which base they would later grow in power to form the Aztec Empire and exert their dominion over the Valley of Mexico (Miller and Taube 1993).

== Festivals and rites ==
During the veintena of Ochpaniztli in the Aztec calendar, harvest-time festival rites were held to honor Toci in her aspect as "Heart of the Earth" (Miller and Taube 1993).

== See also ==
- List of Aztec gods and supernatural beings

== Bibliography ==
- Campbell, R. Joe (1997). "Florentine Codex Vocabulary". Archived from the original on 2006-04-28.
- Miller, Mary; Karl Taube (1993). The Gods and Symbols of Ancient Mexico and the Maya. London: Thames and Hudson. ISBN 0-500-05068-6.
