= Midwifery in Maya society =

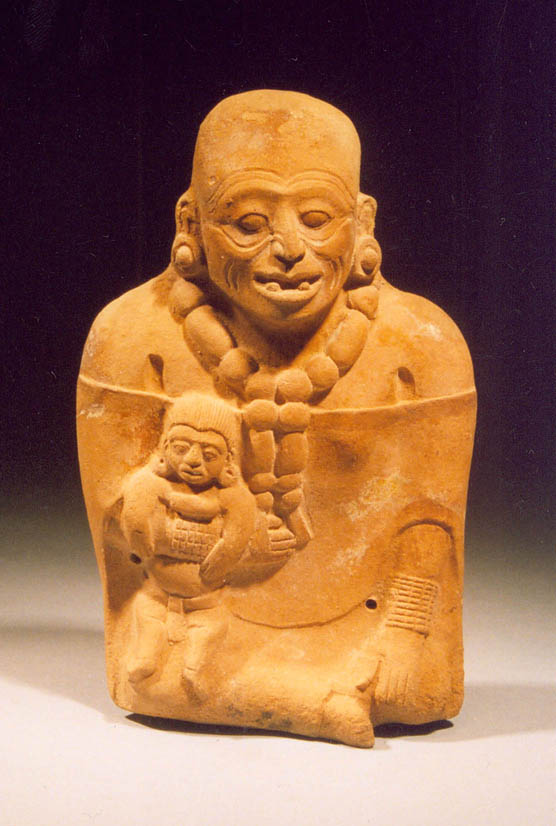
Aged woman with child. Classic Period figurine. Baltimore Museum of Art.

Midwifery is a women's profession that assists women from pregnancy to newborn care. In some traditional Maya communities, a goddess of midwifery is invoked, and midwives are generally believed to be assigned their profession through signs and visions. In pre-Spanish Yucatan, the aged midwife goddess was called Ixchel.

Childbirth is the final rite of passage amongst the Maya that completes a girl's transition to womanhood.

Many of the women who give birth in rural areas are treated by midwives who do not have any formal training but who are believed in Maya religion to have received training in dreams. The traditional birth attendants are known as comadronas or iyom kʼexelom, and receive prestige for their practice.

Midwives in Maya societies are responsible for the ajtuj ("pregnant woman") and her unborn child throughout the pregnancy as well as the week of bed rest following the birth. Unlike other societies in which individuals choose their occupational fields, the Maya people believe that they receive a sacred calling from God through dreams which allows them to practice their destined occupation. The calling is divine and the midwife can communicate with the supernatural world.

Though midwives are held at high prestige for their sacred position in society, these women are often also subject to resentments from their husbands and children as they must spend a great deal of time away from them in order to act as midwives. Midwives must abstain from sex, which sometimes creates difficulties with their husbands.

== Sacred calling ==
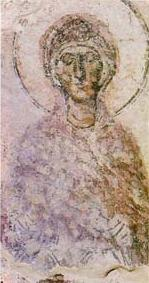
Saint Anne is considered to be a patron of midwives.

In Maya society, it is believed that midwives receive their calling from God in a series of dreams. These visions are believed to often include subtle hints that a woman is destined to become a midwife and can include visions of Saint Anne who is the saint of all midwives. According to the Mayan religion, in addition to receiving dreams and visions, women also tend to find small items in paths that are symbols and objects related to midwifery. The objects are often small unusual stones that resemble the shape of a face, shells, marbles or broken fragments of archaeological figurines. Stones are often given sacred powers in the Maya religion and are believed to be sent from the spiritual world as a sign of one's calling to midwifery. It is also believed that some objects left in a midwife's path may also be the tools they need to perform parts of the birthing, i.e. a penknife that is used to cut the umbilical cord. Women often consult shamans who explain their calling to them, and after the women accept that they are to become midwives, they are believed to receive another series of dreams and visions regarding the birthing practices they must follow. In addition to these special objects, and the repetitious dreams, it is believed that they may also be summoned to mountains or other sacred places where they may encounter supernatural beings. Mayans believe that women who ignore their calling often fall ill, and if doctors are unable to determine a diagnosis for their ailments, they may even face death. They also believe that they are told in their dreams by supernatural beings that they will receive gifts from the families of the children they deliver, and that they must not be greedy; because many will give what they have, it must be accepted with a goodness of heart.

== Responsibilities ==
Midwives are responsible for the pregnant women during their pregnancies without any formal training or learning except for what they believe they receive from their dreams. These dreams are believed to contain visions from the spirits on how to properly examine women, massage a woman, feel for the position of the fetus, measure dilation, cut the umbilical cord, how to pray and how to foretell a child's future by the markings on its umbilical cord. Midwives believe that in these visions they also learn to identify problems that can pose a threat for a healthy delivery and transport those women to nearby clinics and hospitals. Midwives are summoned around the third to fifth month of pregnancy and visit at monthly intervals for prenatal care, until the final month of pregnancy when they begin visiting on a weekly basis. The prenatal care provided by midwives includes periodic massages, examinations, attending the delivery and tending to both new mother and child following the birth in the week of bed rest.

== Signs at birth ==
There are many things that the Mayans believe can be interpreted when a child is born. The Maya calendar for divination, or the "Sacred calendar", is believed to foretell a child's future, as some days are more auspicious than others. The calendar is important in Maya society for interpreting and shaping children's futures. However, Mayans also believe that midwives are able to foretell the life of a child based on the interpretations they can make from the markings on the umbilical cord and the amniotic sac. They believe that based on the markings from the first born, the sex, number and interval of future births can also be foretold. The most important markings are that of a future shaman (worms or flies clutched in the fist of a newborn), midwife (white mantle over the head, which comes from the amniotic membrane) and a baby that will endanger the survival of future siblings (born with a double whorl in its crown).

== Rituals ==
The midwife is the first to see the infant and before a mother can bond with her baby, the midwife is expected to carefully interpret the signs that the child bears, and she alone will interpret what profession the child is destined for. She must then carefully remove, dry and preserve the signs which will be protected by the maternal grandmother. Praying is considered key in the delivery of a child, and as soon as the midwife is informed of a birth she begins praying. She is also expected to pray before entering the house and before touching the pregnant woman. She must also pray to each of the four corners of the room which is said to house invisible guardians. One ritual must be performed when subsequent children die, since it is believed that the first-born child (often born with a double whorl on the umbilical cord) chases and eats the spirit of the newborn. In an effort to save the newborn's life, the midwife wraps a live chicken in a cloth and tours the room with the eldest child praying to each of the four corners. The chicken is then beaten to death on the back of the eldest child (behind closed doors and away from the newborn). She then makes a soup with the chicken and the eldest child is forced to eat it in its entirety, even if it takes several meals to do so. At the end of the bed rest week the midwife must perform her final cleansing rituals, thus signaling the end of her services. The baby is bathed and new dress is placed on the naval, and the hammock in which the baby is to sleep is prayed over. She asks that the baby be protected. The mother also receives purification in a semi-public hair washing ceremony. The final ritual that must be performed is the sweeping and cleaning of the room before she leaves. She then prays one last time, thanking the spirits for a successful delivery.
