= Temazcal =

Mesoamerican sweat lodge

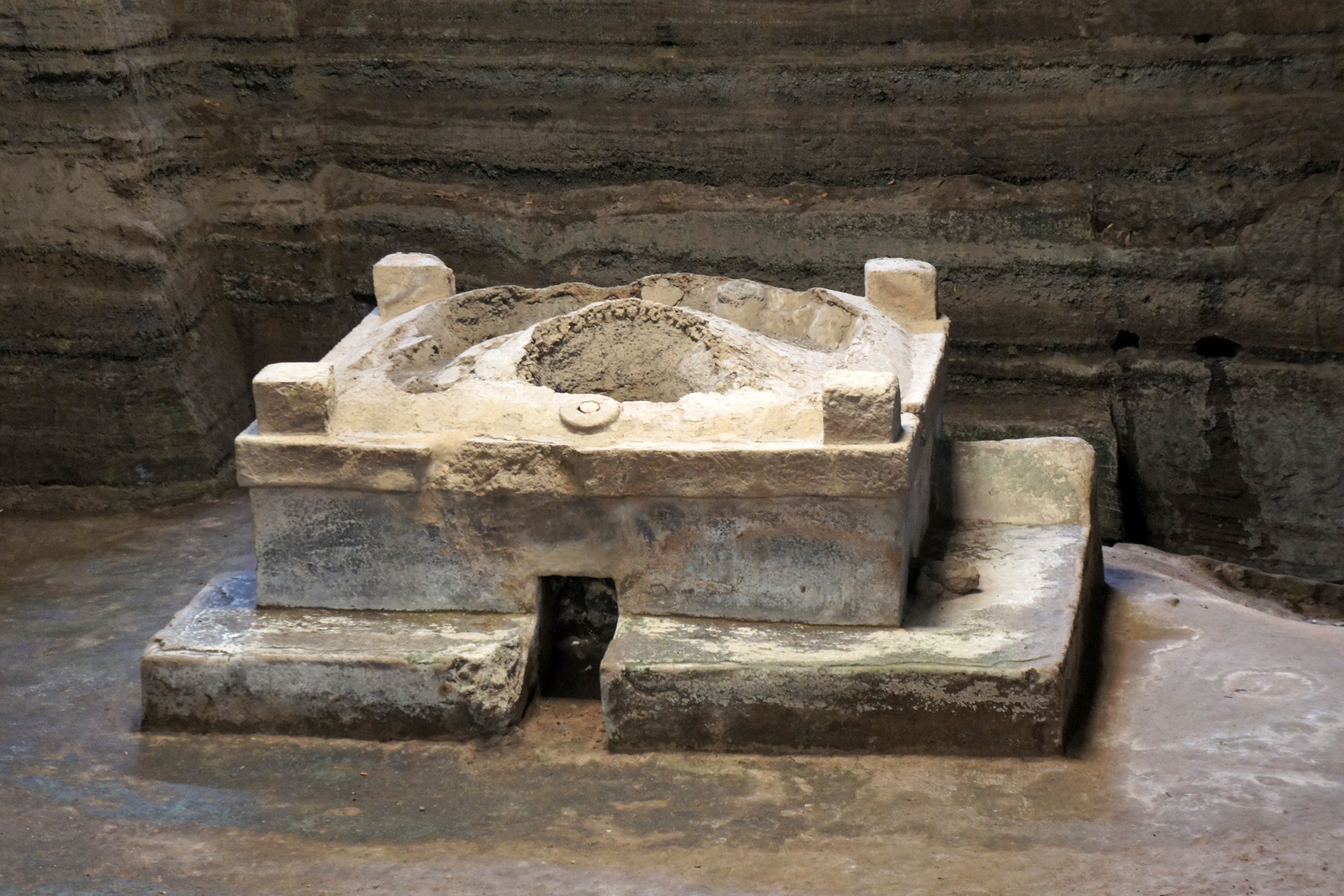
Temazcal at the Joya de Cerén archaeological site, El Salvador

A temazcal [temasˈkal] is a type of sweat lodge, which originated with indigenous peoples in Mesoamerica. The term temazcal comes from the Nahuatl language, either from the words teme (to bathe) and calli (house), or from the word temāzcalli [temaːsˈkalːi] (house of heat).

== Overview ==
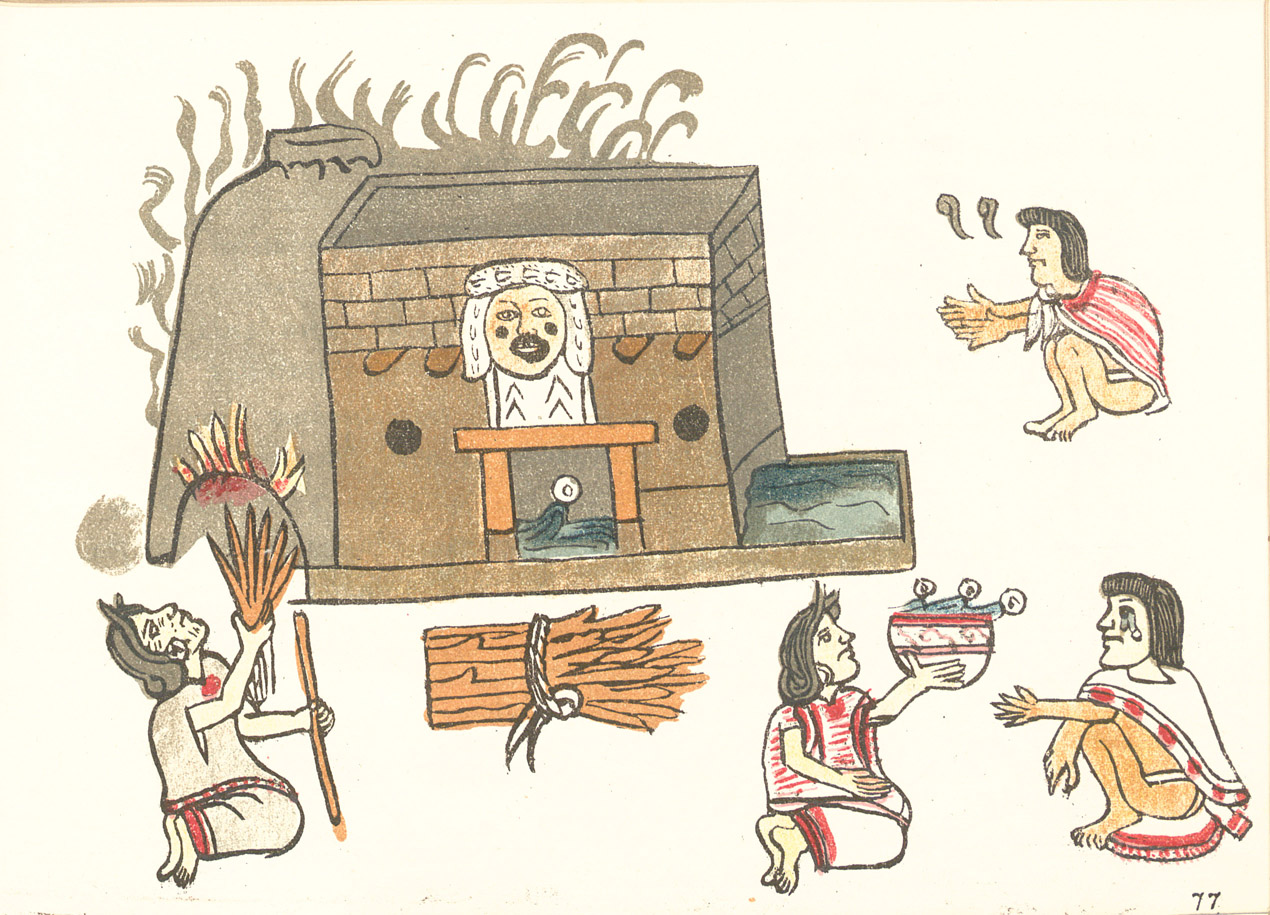
Pictogram of an Aztec temazcal in the Codex Magliabechiano

In ancient Mesoamerica it was used as part of a curative ceremony thought to purify the body after exertion such as after a battle or a ceremonial ball game. It was also used for healing the sick, improving health, and for women to give birth. It continues to be used today in Indigenous cultures of Mexico and Central America that were part of the ancient Mesoamerican region for spiritual healing and health enrichment reasons.

The temazcal is usually a permanent structure, unlike sweat lodges of other regions. It has various construction styles differing by region: from volcanic rock and cement, adobe mud bricks, even wood, mud, and cloth can be utilized. It may be a circular dome made to represent the uterus, although rectangular ones have been found at certain archaeological sites, such as the Cross Group in Palenque, Mexico. To produce steam, water is poured over heated volcanic stones, which will not crack and explode like other rocks in confined high temperature areas. The stones may be heated with fire from an outside port or placed in a pit located in the center or near a wall of the temazcal. In the modern day, the temazcal is used by indigenous midwifes (comadronas) to assist women before, during, and after childbirth.

== See also ==
- Sauna
